= 2019–20 B.League season =

- League: B.League
- Season: 2019–20
- Duration: October 3, 2019 – March 14, 2020 (B1 Regular season); September 20, 2019 – March 14, 2020 (B2 Regular season)
- TV partners: Basket LIVE, DAZN, NHK, SKY PerfecTV!, others

B1 Regular season
- Season MVP: Daiki Tanaka
- Promoted: (B1) Hiroshima Dragonflies, Shinshu Brave Warriors (B2) Saga Ballooners
- Relegated: (B2) None (B3) Tokyo Excellence

B1 Finals
- Champions: not awarded

Statistical leaders
- Points: Davante Gardner
- Rebounds: Jack Cooley
- Assists: Yuki Togashi

The 2019–20 B.League season was the fourth season of the Japanese B.League. The 2020 B. League All-Star Game was played on January 18, 2020 at the Hokkai Kitayell in Sapporo, Hokkaido. At the end of February 2020, the B.League temporarily suspended its competitions for two weeks until March 13, 2020 due to the COVID-19 pandemic. However, on March 27, 2020, the B.League canceled the remainder of the season.

== B1 ==
=== Regular season ===
The regular season began on October 3, 2019 and originally scheduled to end on April 19, 2020.

East District

#	B1	W	L	PCT	GB	GP
1	Alvark Tokyo	32	9	.780	—	41
2	Utsunomiya Brex	31	9	.775	0.5	40
3	Chiba Jets	28	12	.700	3.5	40
4	Sun Rockers Shibuya	27	14	.659	5	41
5	Akita Northern Happinets	19	22	.463	13	41
6	Levanga Hokkaido	13	27	.325	18.5	40

Central District

#	B1	W	L	PCT	GB	GP
1	Kawasaki Brave Thunders	31	9	.775	—	40
2	SeaHorses Mikawa	18	23	.439	13.5	41
3	Toyama Grouses	17	24	.415	14.5	41
4	Niigata Albirex BB	13	28	.317	18.5	41
5	Yokohama B-Corsairs	11	30	.268	20.5	41
6	San-en NeoPhoenix	5	36	.122	26.5	41

West District

#	B1	W	L	PCT	GB	GP
1	Ryukyu Golden Kings	27	14	.659	—	41
2	Osaka Evessa	26	15	.634	1	41
3	Shiga Lakestars	21	20	.512	6	41
4	Kyoto Hannaryz	20	21	.488	7	41
5	Nagoya Diamond Dolphins	17	24	.415	10	41
6	Shimane Susanoo Magic	11	30	.268	16	41

== B1 Individual statistic leaders ==
Category	Player	Team	Statistic
Points per game	Davante Gardner	SeaHorses Mikawa	23.4
Rebounds per game	Jack Cooley	Ryukyu Kings	13.3
Assists per game	Yuki Togashi	Chiba Jets	6.5
Steals per game	Leo Vendrame	Sun Rockers Shibuya	1.8
Blocks per game	Jordan Heath	Kawasaki Brave Thunders	1.5
Turnovers per game	Julian Mavunga	Kyoto Hannaryz	4.4
Fouls per game	De'Mon Brooks	Ryukyu Kings	2.9
Minutes per game	Leo Lyons (basketball)	Toyama Grouses	37.3
FT%	Kosuke Kanamaru	SeaHorses Mikawa	97.4%
3FG%	Keijuro Matsui	Kyoto Hannaryz	47.2%

== B2 ==
2019–20 B.League season

B2 Regular season
- Season MVP: Gregory Echenique

B2 Finals
- Champions: not awarded

Statistical leaders
- Points: Chehales Tapscott
- Rebounds: Kevin Kotzur
- Assists: Kaito Ishikawa

=== Regular season ===
The regular season began on September 20, 2019.

East District

#	B2	W	L	PCT	GB	GP
1	Sendai 89ers	35	12	.745	-	47
2	Gunma Crane Thunders	34	13	.723	1	47
3	Ibaraki Robots	26	21	.553	9	47
4	Aomori Wat's	21	26	.447	14	47
5	Fukushima Firebonds	16	31	.340	19	47
6	Yamagata Wyverns	8	39	.170	27	47

Central District

#	B2	W	L	PCT	GB	GP
1	Shinshu Brave Warriors	40	7	.851	—	47
2	Nishinomiya Storks	29	18	.617	11	47
3	Toyotsu Fighting Eagles Nagoya	25	22	.532	15	47
4	Tokyo Excellence	21	26	.447	19	47
5	Koshigaya Alphas	15	32	.319	25	47
6	Earthfriends Tokyo Z	12	35	.255	28	47

West District

#	B2	W	L	PCT	GB	GP
1	Hiroshima Dragonflies	40	7	.851	-	47
2	Kagawa Five Arrows	27	20	.574	13	47
3	Ehime Orange Vikings	24	23	.511	16	47
4	Kumamoto Volters	20	27	.426	20	47
5	Bambitious Nara	18	29	.383	22	47
6	Rizing Zephyr Fukuoka	12	35	.324	28	47

== B2 Individual statistic leaders ==
Category	Player	Team	Statistic
Points per game	Chehales Tapscott	Gunma Crane Thunders	30.0
Rebounds per game	Kevin Kotzur	Kagawa Five Arrows	15.0
Assists per game	Kaito Ishikawa (basketball)	Kumamoto Volters	9.3
Steals per game	Kei Sugimoto (basketball)	Toyotsu Fighting Eagles Nagoya	1.7
Blocks per game	Wayne Marshall (basketball)	Shinshu Brave Warriors	2.1
Turnovers per game	Terrance Woodbury	Kagawa Five Arrows	4.3
Fouls per game	Kyle Casey	Earthfriends Tokyo Z	3.3
Minutes per game	Bradley Waldow	Nishinomiya Storks	37.9
FT%	Yutaka Yokoe	Bambitious Nara	92.8%
3FG%	Seiya Tanaka	Hiroshima Dragonflies	42.8%

== B3 season ==
=== B3 regular season ===
#	B3 Regular season	W	L	PCT	GB	GP
1	Saga Ballooners	30	10	.750	—	40
2	Aisin AW Areions Anjo	29	11	.725	1	40
3	Toyoda Gosei Scorpions	29	11	.725	1	40
4	Iwate Big Bulls	29	11	.725	1	40
5	Tryhoop Okayama	23	17	.575	7	40
6	Tokyo Hachioji Bee Trains	21	19	.525	9	40
7	Saitama Broncos	19	20	.487	10.5	39
8	Kagoshima Rebnise	16	23	.410	13.5	39
9	Tokyo Cinq Reves	14	26	.350	16	40
10	Veltex Shizuoka	13	26	.333	16.5	39
11	Gifu Swoops	8	31	.205	21.5	39
12	Kanazawa Samuraiz	7	33	.175	23	40

== B3 Individual statistic leaders ==
Category	Player	Team	Statistic
Points per game	Trey Gilder	Saga Ballooners	27.61
Rebounds per game	Joshua Crawford	Tokyo Cinq Reves	12.47
Assists per game	Ren Takemura	Toyoda Gosei Scorpions	5.06
Steals per game	Christopher Washburn Jr.	Kagoshima Rebnise	1.66
Blocks per game	Mark St. Fort	Saitama Broncos	2.00
FT%	Kodai Takahashi	Iwate Big Bulls	90.28%
3FG%	Shuhei Komatsu	Saga Ballooners	46.11%
