= 2018–19 B.League season =

Third season of the Japanese B.League

- League: B.League
- Season: 2018–19
- Duration: September 28, 2018 – May 12, 2019
- TV partner(s): Basket LIVE, DAZN, NHK, SKY PerfecTV!, others

B1 Regular season
- Season MVP: Yuki Togashi
- Promoted: (B1) Shimane Susanoo Magic (B2) Tokyo Excellence, Koshigaya Alphas
- Relegated: (B2) Rizing Zephyr Fukuoka (B3) Kanazawa Samuraiz, Tokyo Hachioji Bee Trains

B1 Finals
- Champions: Alvark Tokyo
- Runners-up: Chiba Jets
- Finals MVP: Yudai Baba

Statistical leaders
- Points: Davante Gardner
- Rebounds: Josh Harrellson
- Assists: Julian Mavunga

The 2018–19 B.League season was the third season of the Japanese B.League.

== B1 Regular season ==
#	B1	W	L	PCT	GB	GP
1	Chiba Jets	52	8	.867	—	60
2	Tochigi Brex	49	11	.817	3	60
3	Niigata Albirex BB	45	15	.750	7	60
4	Alvark Tokyo	44	16	.733	8	60
5	Ryukyu Kings	40	20	.667	12	60
6	Kawasaki Brave Thunders	40	20	.667	12	60
7	Nagoya Diamond Dolphins	33	27	.550	19	60
8	Toyama Grouses	32	28	.533	20	60
9	Kyoto Hannaryz	31	29	.517	21	60
10	SeaHorses Mikawa	31	29	.517	21	60
11	Sun Rockers Shibuya	27	33	.450	25	60
12	Osaka Evessa	23	37	.383	27	60
13	San-en NeoPhoenix	22	38	.367	30	60
14	Shiga Lakestars	18	42	.300	34	60
15	Akita Happinets	17	43	.283	35	60
16	Yokohama B-Corsairs	14	46	.233	38	60
17	Levanga Hokkaido	10	50	.167	42	60
18	Rizing Zephyr Fukuoka	7	48	.127	45	60

== B1 Playoffs ==
Quarter-finals
1 Chiba Jets	102	96
8 Toyama Grouses	73	85
6 Kawasaki Brave Thunders	57	62
2 Tochigi Brex	87	89
5 Ryukyu Golden Kings	53	77	67
7 Nagoya Diamond Dolphins	69	53	43
4 Alvark Tokyo	78	71
3 Niigata Albirex BB	72	68

Semi-finals
1 Chiba Jets	75	88
2 Tochigi Brex	67	83
5 Ryukyu Kings	57	62	60
4 Alvark Tokyo	67	56	72

Final
1 Chiba Jets	67
4 Alvark Tokyo	71

== B1 Relegation playoffs ==
Final
16 Yokohama B-Corsairs	77	89	14
17 Levanga Hokkaido	72	91	22

== B1 Individual statistic leaders ==
Category	Player	Team	Statistic
Points per game	Davante Gardner	Niigata Albirex BB	27.6
Rebounds per game	Josh Harrellson	Osaka Evessa	12.3
Assists per game	Julian Mavunga	Kyoto Hannaryz	8.5
Steals per game	Takuya Nakayama	Akita Northern Happinets	2.2
Blocks per game	Kadeem Coleby	Akita Northern Happinets	2.4
Turnovers per game	Julian Mavunga	Kyoto Hannaryz	3.7
Fouls per game	David Doblas	Levanga Hokkaido	3.5
Minutes per game	Julian Mavunga	Kyoto Hannaryz	38.3
FT%	Kosuke Kanamaru	SeaHorses Mikawa	90.9%
3FG%	Kosuke Ishii	Chiba Jets	45.2%

== B2 Regular season ==
2018–19 B.League season

B2 Regular season
- Season MVP: Thomas Kennedy

B2 Finals
- Champions: Shinshu Brave Warriors
- Runners-up: Gunma Crane Thunders
- Finals MVP: Kaito Ishikawa

Statistical leaders
- Points: Thomas Kennedy
- Rebounds: Gregory Echenique
- Assists: Gary Hamilton

#	B2	W	L	PCT	GB	GP
1	Shinshu Brave Warriors	48	12	.800	—	60
2	Kumamoto Volters	45	15	.750	3	60
3	Gunma Crane Thunders	43	17	.717	5	60
4	Shimane Susanoo Magic	43	17	.717	5	60
5	Toyotsu Fighting Eagles Nagoya	41	19	.683	7	60
6	Sendai 89ers	40	20	.667	8	60
7	Ibaraki Robots	35	25	.583	13	60
8	Nishinomiya Storks	34	26	.567	14	60
9	Hiroshima Dragonflies	32	28	.533	16	60
10	Fukushima Firebonds	27	33	.450	21	60
11	Earthfriends Tokyo Z	22	38	.367	26	60
12	Yamagata Wyverns	22	38	.367	26	60
13	Bambitious Nara	22	38	.367	26	60
14	Kanazawa Samuraiz	21	39	.350	27	60
15	Ehime Orange Vikings	20	40	.333	28	60
16	Kagawa Five Arrows	19	41	.317	29	60
17	Aomori Wat's	15	45	.250	33	60
18	Tokyo Hachioji Bee Trains	11	49	.183	37	60

== B2 playoffs ==
Semi-finals
1 Shinshu Brave Warriors	74	72
4 Shimane Susanoo Magic	61	57
2 Kumamoto Volters	72	75	72
3 Gunma Crane Thunders	81	50	73

Final
1 Shinshu Brave Warriors	82	84
3 Gunma Crane Thunders	63	77

Third place
2 Kumamoto Volters	88	77
4 Shimane Susanoo Magic	91	82

B2B3 P/R final
18	Tokyo Hachioji Bee Trains	64
B3-2	Koshigaya Alphas	86

== B2 Individual statistic leaders ==
Category	Player	Team	Statistic
Points per game	Thomas Kennedy	Gunma Crane Thunders	27.9
Rebounds per game	Gregory Echenique	Shimane Susanoo Magic	13.7
Assists per game	Gary Hamilton	Bambitious Nara	7.5
Steals per game	Cullen Russo	Aomori Wat's	2.2
Blocks per game	Chukwudiebere Maduabum	Yamagata Wyverns	2.6
Turnovers per game	Cullen Russo	Aomori Wat's	3.7
Fouls per game	Evan Ravenel	Fukushima Firebonds	3.6
Minutes per game	Cullen Russo	Aomori Wat's	39.1
FT%	Yasuyuki Miyazaki	Toyotsu Fighting Eagles Nagoya	90.5%
3FG%	Yasuyuki Miyazaki	Toyotsu Fighting Eagles Nagoya	46.4%

== B3 season ==
=== B3 First stage ===
#	B3 First Stage	W	L	PCT	GB	GP
1	Otsuka Corporation Koshigaya Alphas	11	1	.917	—	12
2	Tokyo Excellence	11	1	.917	0	12
3	Tokyo Cinq Reves	7	5	.583	4	12
4	Saitama Broncos	5	7	.417	6	12
5	Gifu Swoops	4	8	.333	7	12
6	Iwate Big Bulls	3	9	.250	8	12
7	Kagoshima Rebnise	1	11	.083	11	12

=== B3 regular season ===
#	B3 Regular season	W	L	PCT	GB	GP
1	Tokyo Excellence	32	4	.889	—	36
2	Toyoda Gosei Scorpions	28	8	.778	4	36
3	Otsuka Corporation Koshigaya Alphas	27	9	.750	5	36
4	Aisin AW Areions Anjo	25	11	.694	7	36
5	Tokyo Cinq Reves	21	15	.583	11	36
6	Saitama Broncos	14	22	.389	18	36
7	Kagoshima Rebnise	13	23	.361	19	36
8	Gifu Swoops	12	24	.333	20	36
9	Iwate Big Bulls	7	29	.194	25	36
10	Tokio Marine Nichido Big Blue	1	35	.028	31	36

=== B3 Final stage ===
#	B3 Final Stage	W	L	PCT	GB	GP
1	Tokyo Excellence	11	1	.917	—	12
2	Koshigaya Alphas	8	4	.667	3	12
3	Tokyo Cinq Reves	7	5	.583	4	12
4	Iwate Big Bulls	6	6	.500	5	12
5	Gifu Swoops	4	8	.333	7	12
6	Kagoshima Rebnise	3	9	.250	8	12
7	Saitama Broncos	3	9	.250	8	12

== B3 Individual statistic leaders ==
Category	Player	Team	Statistic
Points per game	Ryan Stephan	Tokyo Excellence	24.00
Rebounds per game	Brian Voelkel	Toyoda Gosei Scorpions	17.23
Assists per game	Brian Voelkel	Toyoda Gosei Scorpions	9.11
Steals per game	Brian Voelkel	Toyoda Gosei Scorpions	2.46
Blocks per game	Jordan Faison	Tokyo Excellence	2.17
FT%	Eiji Sumihiro	Toyoda Gosei Scorpions	90.24%
3FG%	Kenta Tateyama	Kagoshima Rebnise	43.41%
