= Hirotaka Sato =

Japanese basketball player

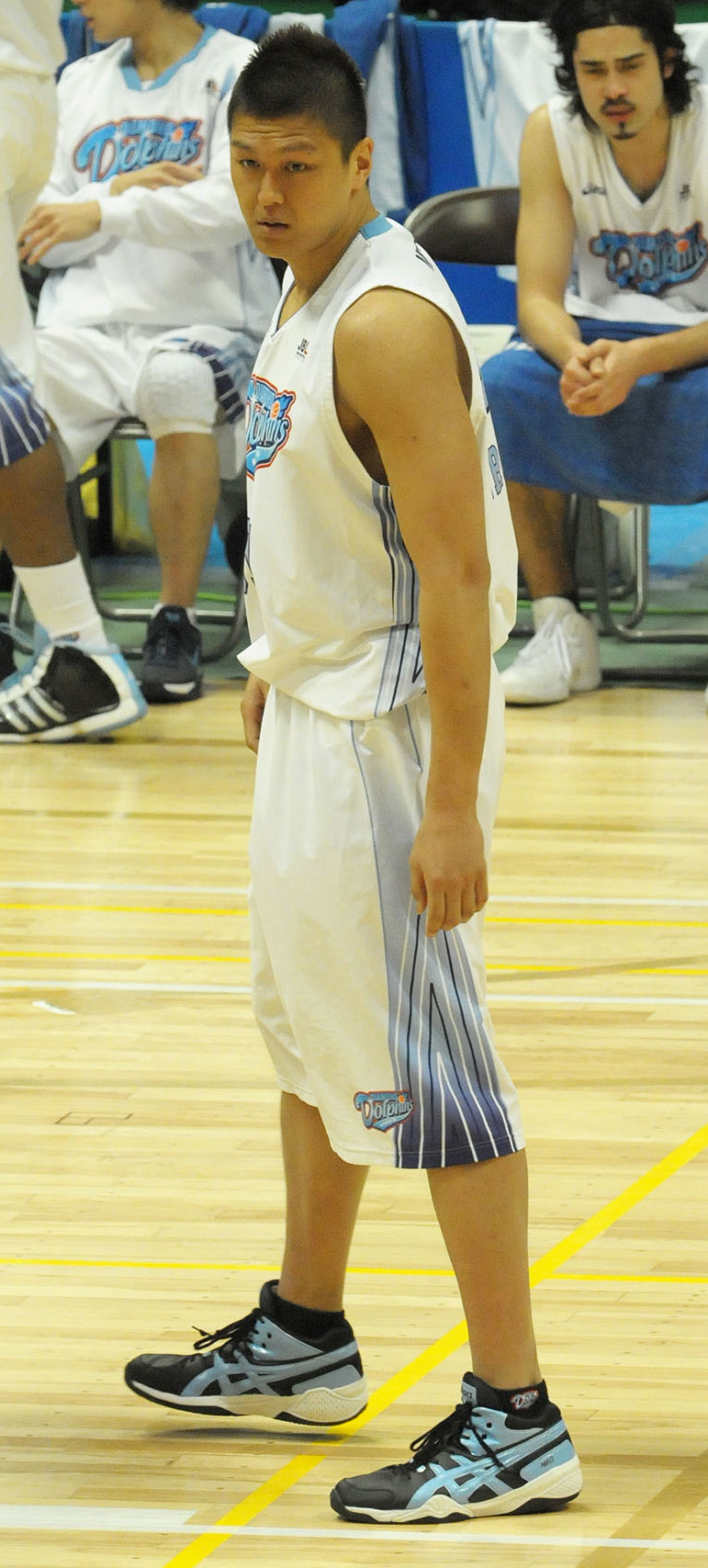
- Sato in 2012

Personal information
- Born: December 8, 1981 (age 44) Odawara, Kanagawa, Japan
- Listed height: 6 ft 8 in (2.03 m)
- Listed weight: 243 lb (110 kg)

Career information
- High school: Soyo (Odawara, Kanagawa)
- College: Senshu University
- Playing career: 2004–2020
- Position: Center

Career history
- 2004–2006: Matsushita Electric
- 2006–2008: Osaka Evessa
- 2008–2011: Shiga Lakestars
- 2011–2012: Mitsubishi Electric
- 2012–2013: Shimane Susanoo Magic
- 2013–2015: Osaka Evessa
- 2015–2016: Nishinomiya Storks
- 2016–2017: Cyberdyne Ibaraki Robots
- 2017–2018: Akita Northern Happinets
- 2018-2019: Nishinomiya Storks
- 2019-2020: Kanazawa Samuraiz

Career highlights
- 2× bj league champion

Hirotaka Sato (佐藤 浩貴, Satō Hirotaka; born December 8, 1981) is a Japanese former professional basketball player for Kanazawa Samuraiz of the B.League in Japan. He played college basketball for Senshu University. He was selected by the Osaka Evessa with the 4th overall pick in the 2006 bj League draft.

== Stats ==
Legend
GP	Games played	GS	Games started	MPG	Minutes per game
FG%	Field goal percentage	3P%	3-point field goal percentage	FT%	Free throw percentage
RPG	Rebounds per game	APG	Assists per game	SPG	Steals per game
BPG	Blocks per game	PPG	Points per game	**Bold**	Career high

†	Denotes seasons in which Sato won an championship

=== Regular season ===
Year	Team	GP	GS	MPG	FG%	3P%	FT%	RPG	APG	SPG	BPG	PPG
2004-05	Matsushita											
2005-06	Matsushita											
2006-07†	Osaka	24	0	5.7	50.0	-	50.0	0.8	0.2	0.1	0.1	0.8
2007-08†	Osaka	8	0	3.1	0.0	-	50.0	1.2	0.0	0.0	0.0	0.2
2008-09	Shiga	51	28	10.7	53.3	-	50.0	2.5	0.1	0.1	0.1	1.4
2009-10	Shiga	23	0	3.7	55.6	-	66.7	0.7	0.0	0.0	0.0	0.5
2010-11	Shiga	21	0	5.4	50.0	-	0.0	1.4	0.1	0.0	0.0	0.4
2011-12	Mitsubishi	16	0	3.1	33.3	-	50.0	0.6	0.0	0.1	0.1	0.2
2012-13	Shimane	7	0	2.7	-	-	-	0.0	0.0	0.1	0.0	0.0
2013-14	Osaka	17	1	2.4	100	-	-	0.4	0.1	0.0	0.0	0.1
2014-15	Osaka	16	0	2.9	-	-	-	0.3	0.0	0.0	0.0	0.0
2015-16	Nishinomiya	11	0	2.5	100	-	0.0	0.5	0.0	0.0	0.0	0.2
2016-17	Ibaraki	49	17	3.5	50.0	-	50.0	0.8	0.0	0.1	0.0	0.2
2017-18	Akita	20	4	5.2	25	-	0	0.6	0.1	0.1	0.1	0.2
2018-19	Nishinomiya	16	1	3.18	100	0	0	0.8	0.1	0	0	0.1
2019-20	Kanazawa	39	3	7.4	44.4	0	55.6	1.3	0.0	0	0	0.3

=== Playoffs ===
Year	Team	GP	GS	MPG	FG%	3P%	FT%	RPG	APG	SPG	BPG	PPG
2010-11	Shiga	1		1.0	1.000	.000	.000	0.0	1.0	0.0	0.0	2.0

=== Early cup games ===
Year	Team	GP	GS	MPG	FG%	3P%	FT%	RPG	APG	SPG	BPG	PPG
2017	Akita	2	0	6.44	.500	.000	.250	1.0	0.0	0.5	0	1.5
2018	Nishinomiya	3	0	9.17	.333	.000	.500	1.0	0.3	0.33	0	1.0

== Personal ==
His father Tetsuo Sato is an Olympic medalist in volleyball. His cousin Kosuke Ishii is a professional basketball player for the Sun Rockers Shibuya of the B.League.
