= Takayuki Yasuda =

Japanese basketball coach

Takayuki Yasuda 保田 尭之
Ehime Orange Vikings
- Position: Head coach
- League: B.League

Personal information
- Born: July 15, 1989 (age 37) Sakai, Osaka

Career information
- High school: Kanan (Tondabayashi, Osaka)
- College: Kansai Gaidai University; University of Salamanca
- Coaching career: 2013–present

Career history

Coaching
- 2013-2014: Wakayama Trians (asst.)
- 2014–2016: Kumamoto Volters (asst.)
- 2016-2019: Kumamoto Volters
- 2019-2021: Saga Ballooners (asst)
- 2021-2022: Shiga Lakestars (asst)
- 2022-2023: Shiga Lakes
- 2023-present: Ehime Orange Vikings

Takayuki Yasuda (保田 尭之, Yasuda Takayuki) is the head coach of the Ehime Orange Vikings in the Japanese B.League.

== Head coaching record ==
Legend
Regular season	G	Games coached	W	Games won	L	Games lost	W–L %	Win–loss %
Playoffs	PG	Playoff games	PW	Playoff wins	PL	Playoff losses	PW–L %	Playoff win–loss %

Team	Year	G	W	L	W–L%	Finish	PG	PW	PL	PW–L%	Result
Kumamoto Volters	2016-17	60	44	16	.733	3rd in B2 Western	-	-	-	–	-
Kumamoto Volters	2017-18	60	41	19	.683	2nd in B2 Western	5	2	3	.400	3rd in B2
Kumamoto Volters	2018-19	60	45	15	.750	1st in B2 Western	5	1	4	.200	4th in B2
