= Joel James =

Joel James may refer to:

- Joel James (basketball) (born 1994), American basketball player
- Joel James (politician), Welsh politician
- Joel James (rugby league player), English rugby league player
