= Rintaro Tokunaga =

Japanese professional basketball player (born 1986)

Rintaro Tokunaga 徳永林太郎
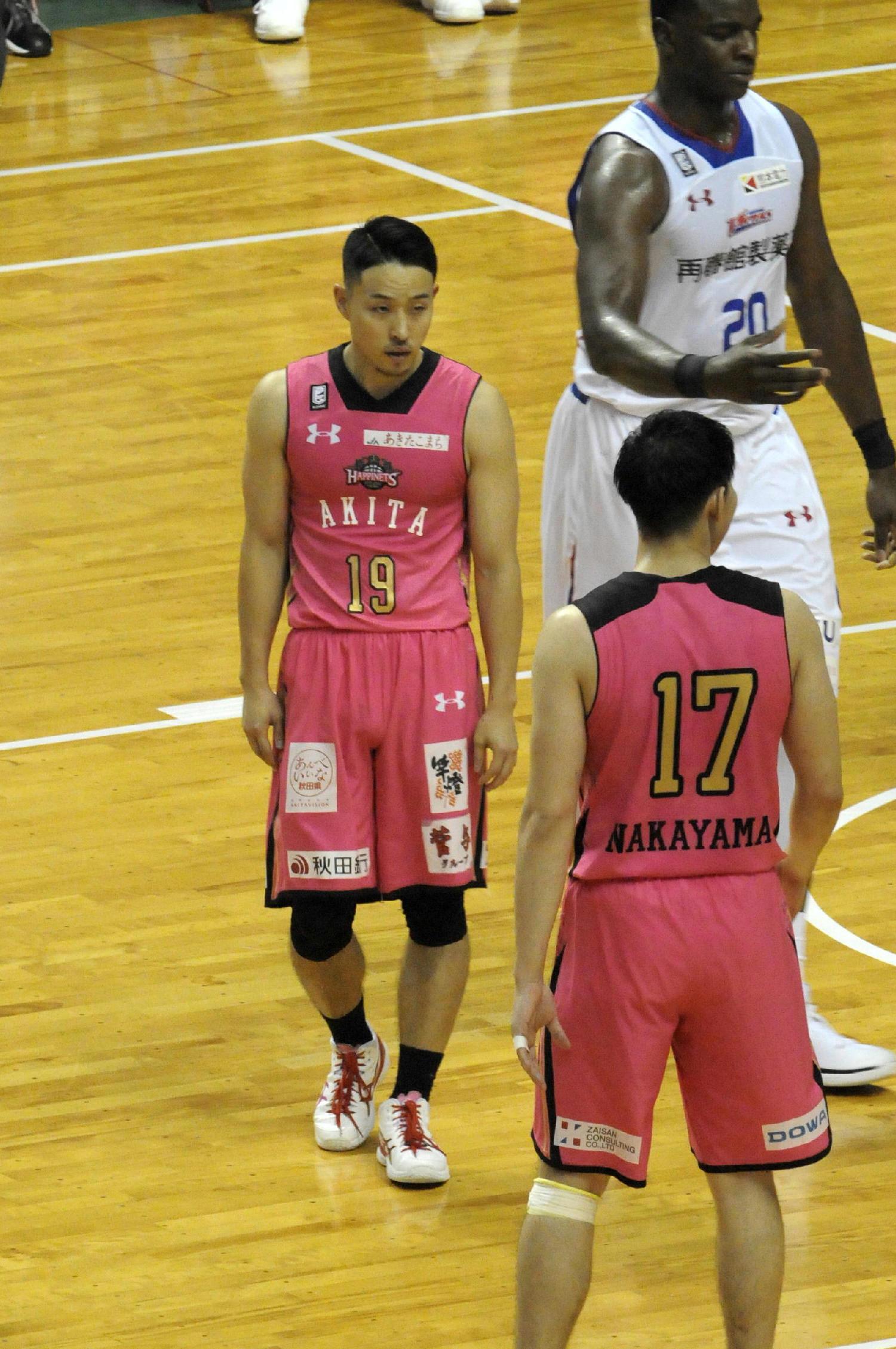

Personal information
- Born: December 29, 1986 (age 39) Fukuoka, Fukuoka, Japan
- Listed height: 5 ft 10 in (1.78 m)
- Listed weight: 165 lb (75 kg)

Career information
- High school: Fukuoka Seiryo (Nishi-ku, Fukuoka)
- Playing career: 2011–present
- Position: Point guard

Career history
- 2011–2015: Rizing Fukuoka
- 2015–2016: Kyoto Hannaryz
- 2016–2017: Kagawa Five Arrows
- 2017–2018: Akita Northern Happinets
- 2019-2020: Saga Ballooners

Rintaro Tokunaga (born December 29, 1987) is a Japanese professional basketball player who plays for Saga Ballooners of the B.League in Japan. He torn his left knee ACL on April 15, 2018. His nickname is "Rinrin".

== Stats ==
Legend
GP	Games played	GS	Games started	MPG	Minutes per game
FG%	Field goal percentage	3P%	3-point field goal percentage	FT%	Free throw percentage
RPG	Rebounds per game	APG	Assists per game	SPG	Steals per game
BPG	Blocks per game	PPG	Points per game	**Bold**	Career high

=== Regular season ===
Year	Team	GP	GS	MPG	FG%	3P%	FT%	RPG	APG	SPG	BPG	PPG
bj League 2011-12	Fukuoka	34	1	7.4	43.5	18.2	66.7	0.8	0.2	0.1	0.0	1.9
bj League 2012-13	Fukuoka	49	0	9.4	42.5	34.1	**78.6**	0.7	0.5	0.5	0.0	2.0
bj League 2013-14	Fukuoka	41	14	10.2	33.0	16.7	69.7	1.1	0.7	0.6	0.0	2.1
bj League 2014-15	Fukuoka	44	23	19.3	36.0	16.7	53.7	1.8	2.1	1.1	**0.1**	3.8
bj League 2015-16	Kyoto	44	2	7.8	**55.1**	28.6	57.5	0.9	0.7	0.4	0.0	2.3
B2 2016-17	Kagawa	**60**	**59**	**29.6**	41.9	32.1	65.9	**4.5**	**2.7**	**1.5**	**0.1**	**8.3**
B2 2017-18	Akita	53	14	15.6	35.8	**37.0**	76.1	2.1	1.8	0.8	0.0	4.2
B3 2019-20	Saga	18	2	17.3	33.9	25.9	63.2	1.3	1.1	0.8	0.0	3.2

=== Playoffs ===
Year	Team	GP	GS	MPG	FG%	3P%	FT%	RPG	APG	SPG	BPG	PPG
2011-12	Fukuoka	2		5.0	.500	.000	.000	1.0	0.5	0.0	0.0	1.0

=== Early cup games ===
Year	Team	GP	GS	MPG	FG%	3P%	FT%	RPG	APG	SPG	BPG	PPG
2017	Akita	2	1	21.24	.615	.000	.000	4.5	2.5	1.5	0.0	8.0
