= Jahmar Thorpe =

American basketball player

Free agent
- Position: Power forward

Personal information
- Born: September 2, 1984 (age 42) Morristown, New Jersey, U.S.
- Listed height: 6 ft 6 in (1.98 m)
- Listed weight: 215 lb (98 kg)

Career information
- High school: Morristown (Morristown, New Jersey)
- College: Caldwell College (2002–2003); Western Oklahoma State (2003–2005); Houston (2005–2007)
- NBA draft: 2007: undrafted
- Playing career: 2007–present

Career history
- 2007–2008: BG Göttingen
- 2008–2009: Ausitin Toros
- 2009–2010: Salon Vipas Vikings
- 2010–2011: Bakken Bears
- 2011–2012: Changan Group Guangdong
- 2012: Saigon Heat
- 2012–2013: Forssan Koripoiat
- 2013–2014: Saint-Brieuc Basket Cotes D’Armor
- 2014: Randers Cimbria
- 2014: Link Tochigi Brex
- 2015–2016: Levanga Hokkaido
- 2016–2017: Basket Esch
- 2017: Levanga Hokkaido
- 2017–2018: Sun Rockers Shibuya
- 2018: Iwate Big Bulls
- 2018–2019: Osaka Evessa
- 2019: Bambitious Nara
- 2019: Tokyo Hachioji Bee Trains
- 2019–2020: Kumamoto Volters
- 2020: Kawasaki Brave Thunders
- 2020: Saga Ballooners
- 2020: Sendai 89ers
- 2021: Rizing Zephyr Fukuoka
- 2021: Alvark Tokyo
- 2021: Kanazawa Samuraiz
- 2021-2022: Altiri Chiba
- 2022: Koshigaya Alphas

Jahmar Thorpe (born September 2, 1984) is an American professional basketball player for the Kanazawa Samuraiz in Japan.

Born in Morristown, New Jersey, Thorpe played basketball at Morristown High School.

Thorpe joined Kawasaki Brave Thunders in 2020 and averaged 1.7 points, 2.5 rebounds and 1.0 assist per game. He signed with the Saga Ballooners on September 29, 2020. In 2021, he played for Alvark Tokyo and averaged 4.9 points and 3.0 rebounds per game. On September 6, 2021, Thorpe signed with the Kanazawa Samuraiz.
