= Jeff Hironaka =

American basketball coach

Personal information
- Born: c. 1956 – c. 1957 Weiser, Idaho, U.S.

Career information
- Playing career: High school coaching (Weiser, Ririe, Blackfoot); college‐level coaching since 1987–present

Career highlights
- GNAC Coach of the Year (2006, 2007); NABC West Region Coach of the Year (2006)

Jeff Hironaka (born 1956 or 1957) is an American basketball coach for Genesis Prep since 2020. Before joining the Post Falls, Idaho school, Hironaka primarily coached at Weiser High School during the 1980s for five years. After briefly coaching at Ririe High School and Blackfoot High School for a year each, Hironaka became an assistant coach for Idaho State University in 1987. He then became an assistant coach at The Master's College in 1990. With the Seattle Pacific Falcons, Hironaka became an assistant coach in 1991 before becoming their coach in 2002.

With Seattle Pacific, Hironaka was "the second Japanese-American to coach basketball at a four-year university". After his team appeared at the 2006 NCAA Division II men's basketball tournament semifinals, Hironaka had 134 wins and 67 losses before his position ended in 2009. Between 2009 and 2016, Hironaka held assistant positions with the Washington State Cougars men's basketball team and the Portland State Vikings. In 2017, Hironaka joined the men's basketball team for the Colorado Christian Cougars. With Colorado Christian, Hironaka had 16 wins and 68 losses before leaving for Genesis Prep in 2020.

== Early life and education ==
Before his birth, his family was at the Heart Mountain Relocation Center during World War II. Hironaka was born in Weiser, Idaho, in the mid to late 1950s. While in Idaho, Hironaka lived and worked on a farm during his childhood. Hironaka played basketball in elementary school. He attended Eastern Oregon University, where he played basketball, before studying at Idaho State University for his post-secondary education.

== Career ==
=== 1970s to 1980s ===
While at Eastern Oregon, Hironaka became a junior varsity coach in 1979. Starting in 1980, Hironaka started his high school basketball coach career when he spent five years at Weiser High School. During this time period, Hironaka was an assistant coach for the varsity team and head coach for junior varsity. Apart from sports, Hironaka was a math teacher at Weiser. From 1985 to 1987, Hironaka spent a year each at Ririe High School and Blackfoot High School as their coach.

While at Blackfoot in November 1986, Hironaka proposed a policy to only allow short hair on his basketball team. Hironaka said "the rule is for team unity, not individualism" after the Shoshone-Bannock people disagreed with the idea. Later that month, Hironaka reversed his decision and allowed his team to wear both short hair and long hair. With these three high schools, Hironaka coached teams ranging from the 2A to 4A division. In 1987, Hironaka started a three-year assistant coaching position for Idaho State University. Prior to his position at Idaho State, Hiornaka was chosen to hold coordinator positions as part of his assistant role.

=== 1990s to 2020s ===
In 1990, Hironaka continued his assistant basketball coaching career when he joined The Master's College. After joining the Seattle Pacific Falcons men's basketball team as an assistant coach in 1991, Hironaka became their coach in 2002 after Ken Bone left the team. With Seattle Pacific, his team reached the semifinals of the 2006 NCAA Division II men's basketball tournament. Hironaka had 134 wins and 67 losses before leaving the team in 2009. During this time period, Hironaka was one of the final ten people being considered to become the basketball coach for the Chaminade Silverswords in 1996. He was also one of four candidates when the Eastern Washington Eagles were looking for a men's basketball coach in 2007.

In 2009, Hironaka resumed his assistant coaching tenure when he became part of the Washington State Cougars men's basketball team. During his time at Washington State, Hironaka remained as an assistant before becoming the basketball team's Director of Player Personnel in 2012. He had worked as a scout and recruiting coordinator for Washington State before being given his new position. That year, Hironaka was a candidate to become coach of the Bemidji State Beavers basketball team.

In 2013, Hironaka left Washington State to join the Portland State Vikings as an assistant coach for their basketball team. He remained as an assistant with Portland State until 2016. From 2017 to 2020, Hironaka had 16 wins and 68 losses as the men's basketball team coach for the Colorado Christian Cougars. At the end of 2020, Hironaka was hired by Genesis Prep as a basketball coach and math teacher for the Post Falls, Idaho school. With the Genesis Prep Jaguars boys basketball team, Hironaka won his first game in December 2020.

In June 2024, Hironaka was appointed head coach of the Kumamoto Volters, a team in the lower division of Japan's professional basketball league, the B.LEAGUE. However, the team's performance was poor, and in December, Hironaka offered his resignation, which was accepted.

== Awards and honors ==
While at Seattle Pacific in 2002, Hironaka became "the second Japanese-American to coach basketball at a four-year university". As part of the Great Northwest Athletic Conference, Hironaka was Coach of the Year in 2006 and Co-Coach of the Year in 2007 for men's basketball teams.
