= Don Beck =

Don Beck may refer to:

- Don Edward Beck (1937–2022), American management consultant and author
- Don Beck (politician) (born 1936), Australian politician
- Don Beck (basketball) (born 1953), American professional basketball coach
