= Gavin Ware =

American basketball player (born 1993)

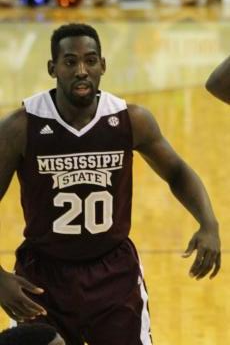
- Ware playing for Mississippi State

No. 20 – Limoges CSP
- Position: Center
- League: LNB Élite

Personal information
- Born: October 19, 1993 (age 33) Starkville, Mississippi, U.S.
- Listed height: 6 ft 9 in (2.06 m)
- Listed weight: 260 lb (118 kg)

Career information
- High school: Starkville (Starkville, Mississippi)
- College: Mississippi State (2012–2016)
- NBA draft: 2016: undrafted
- Playing career: 2016–present

Career history
- 2016–2017: Port of Antwerp Giants
- 2017–2018: Levallois Metropolitans
- 2018–2019: JDA Dijon
- 2019–2020: Kumamoto Volters
- 2020: s.Oliver Würzburg
- 2020–2021: BCM Gravelines
- 2021–2023: JDA Dijon
- 2023–2024: Rizing Zephyr Fukuoka
- 2024–2025: JDA Dijon
- 2025–present: Limoges CSP

Career highlights
- SEC All-Freshman team (2013)

Gavin Ware (born October 19, 1993) is an American professional basketball player for Limoges of the LNB Élite. He played college basketball for the Mississippi State Bulldogs. In his senior season, Ware averaged 15.4 points per game and 7.8 rebounds per game.

After graduating, Ware signed with the Port of Antwerp Giants of the Belgian league. In July 2017 he signed a contract with the Paris-Levallois Basket of the National Basketball League of France to play in the 2017–18 season. Ware averaged 12.2 points and 6.7 rebounds per game in Pro A. In July 2018, he signed with JDA Dijon.

On August 14, 2020, Ware signed with s.Oliver Würzburg.

On December 9, 2020, he has signed with BCM Gravelines of the LNB Pro A.

On July 15, 2021, he has signed with and returned to JDA Dijon Basket of France's LNB Pro A.

On June 23, 2023, Ware signed with Rizing Zephyr Fukuoka of the B.League.

On June 28, 2024, he signed with JDA Dijon of the LNB Pro A for a second stint.

On August 5, 2025, he signed with Limoges CSP of the LNB Pro A.
