= Paul Butorac =

American basketball player

Paul Butorac ポール・ビュートラック
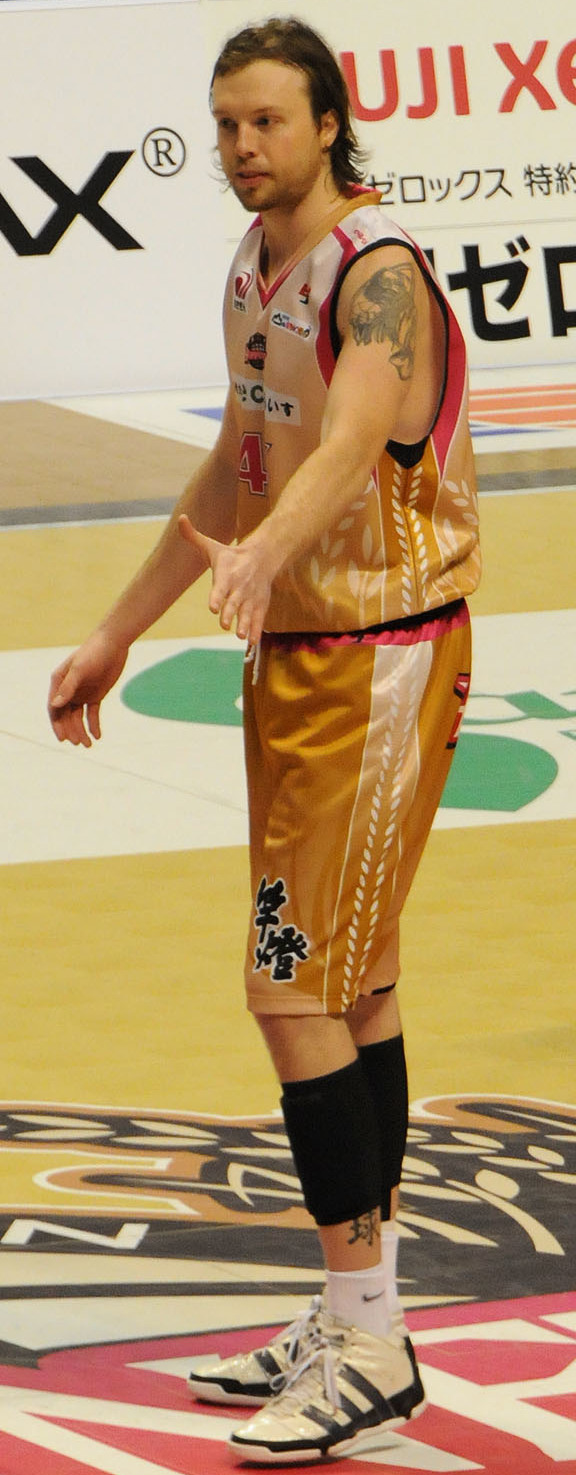
- Butorac at Akita Municipal Gymnasium

Lilac City Legends
- Position: Head coach
- League: American Basketball Association

Personal information
- Born: November 25, 1983 (age 42) Galveston, Texas, U.S.
- Listed height: 208 cm (6 ft 10 in)
- Listed weight: 95 kg (209 lb)

Career information
- High school: Medical Lake (Medical Lake, Washington)
- College: Eastern Washington (2003–2007)
- NBA draft: 2007: undrafted
- Playing career: 2007–2019

Career history

Playing
- 2007: SO Maritime Boulogne
- 2007: Atlas Stal Ostrow Wielkopolski
- 2007: Liepajas Lauvas
- 2008: Colorado 14ers
- 2008: Kalev Tallinn
- 2008–2010: Niigata Albirex BB
- 2010–2011: Akita Northern Happinets
- 2011–2012: Takamatsu Five Arrows
- 2012: Yokohama B-Corsairs
- 2013: Toyotsu Fighting Eagles Nagoya
- 2013: Yambol
- 2014: TGI D-Rise
- 2014–2015: Wakayama Trians
- 2015: Saitama Broncos
- 2015: Fubon Braves
- 2016: Mono Vampire Basketball Club
- 2016: Rayos de Hermosillo
- 2016–2017: Kumamoto Volters
- 2018–2019: Kosei Club

Coaching
- 2020–present: Lilac City Legends

Paul Butorac (born November 25, 1983) is an American former professional basketball player. He currently coaches Lilac City Legends of the American Basketball Association (ABA) .

== College statistics ==
Year	Team	GP	GS	MPG	FG%	3P%	FT%	RPG	APG	SPG	BPG	PPG
2003–04	Eastern Washington	30	2	12.3	.585	.200	.632	2.5	0.5	0.2	0.4	4.0
2004–05	Eastern Washington	26	2	15.9	.516	.333	.653	3.0	0.7	0.2	0.3	5.1
2005–06	Eastern Washington	29	28	24.2	.573	.438	.610	5.4	1.4	0.4	1.8	10.3
2006–07	Eastern Washington	28	28	28.0	.640	.238	.585	6.7	1.7	0.5	1.0	14.4
Career		113	60	20.1	.593	.313	.608	4.4	1.1	0.3	0.9	8.5

== Career statistics ==
Legend
GP	Games played	GS	Games started	MPG	Minutes per game
FG%	Field goal percentage	3P%	3-point field goal percentage	FT%	Free throw percentage
RPG	Rebounds per game	APG	Assists per game	SPG	Steals per game
BPG	Blocks per game	PPG	Points per game	**Bold**	Career high

Year	Team	GP	GS	MPG	FG%	3P%	FT%	RPG	APG	SPG	BPG	PPG
2007–08	Boulogne-sur-Mer	6		20.3	.441	.286	.824	4.2	1.0	1.0	0.3	11.3
2007–08	Stal Ostrow Wielkopolski	2		5.5	.500	.000	.000	2.0	0.0	0.5	0.0	3.0
2007–08	Colorado 14ers	3	0	5.4	.333	.000	.000	0	0.67	0.0	0.0	0.67
2008–09	TTU/Kalev	6		13.2	.483	.125	.538	2.3	0.3	0.0	0.3	6.0
2008–09	Niigata	42	41	31.0	.557	.000	.564	9.0	1.3	0.9	1.0	16.0
2010–11	Akita	42	39	26.4	.541	.143	.548	7.7	1.2	0.3	0.5	14.4
2011–12	Takamatsu	44	43	33.3	.423	.233	.644	8.0	1.4	0.4	0.4	17.3
2012–13	Yokohama	14		19.3	.520	.409	.679	4.6	0.5	0.1	0.4	10.5
2012–13	Toyota Tsusho											
2013–14	BC Yambol	8	5	24.1	.487	.263	.529	5.62	0.75	0.38	0.62	11.00
2013–14	TGI D-Rise	16		28.3	.557	.286	.639	11.0	1.9	0.6	0.8	16.6
2014–15	Wakayama	53	37	29.1	.418	.279	.643	7.4	1.7	0.5	0.5	15.0
2015–16	Saitama	14	7	20.7	.436	.279	.652	6.8	1.4	0.4	0.9	10.6
2015–16	Fubon Braves	2	2		.367	.273	.250	13.5	2	0	0.5	9.5
2015–16	Vampire	4		34.0	.316	.154	.600	7.5	1.8	0.3	2.3	9.0
2015–16	Rayos de Hermosillo	59	56	24.9	.597	.244	.636	8.12	0.80	0.31	0.39	10.69
2016–17	Kumamoto	60		14.8	.487	.267	.656	3.8	0.9	0.3	0.8	14.8

=== Playoff games ===
Year	Team	GP	GS	MPG	FG%	3P%	FT%	RPG	APG	SPG	BPG	PPG
2010–2011	Akita	2		18.5	.500	.000	.400	5.5	0.0	0.0	0.0	8.0

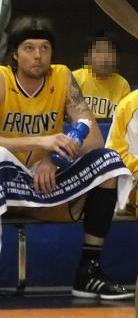
Butorac with Arrows
