= Tshilidzi Kawata =

South African basketball player

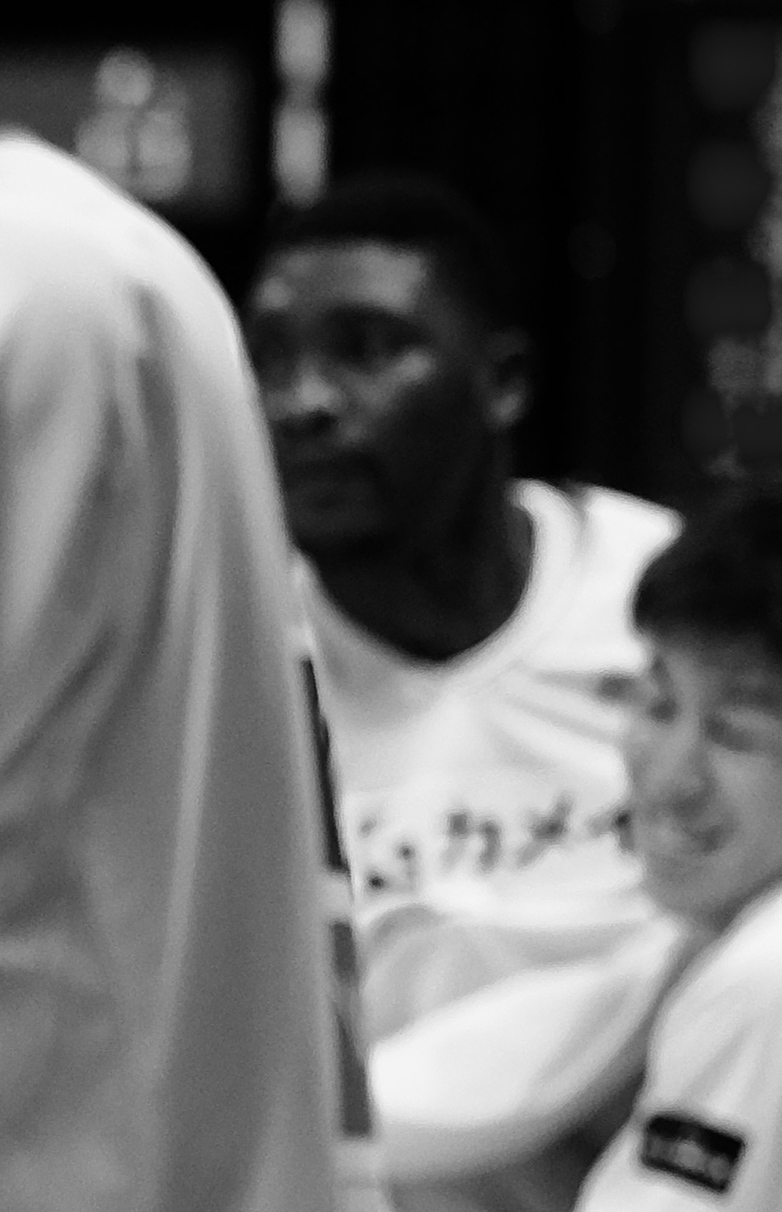

No. 15 – Shinshu brave warriors
- Position: Center
- League: B.League

Personal information
- Born: 10 June 1989 (age 37) Limpopo South Africa
- Listed height: 6 ft 10 in (2.08 m)
- Listed weight: 269 lb (122 kg)

Career information
- High school: Stoneridge Prep (Simi Valley, California)
- College: New Mexico State (2010–2015)
- NBA draft: 2015: undrafted
- Playing career: 2015–present

Career history
- 2015–2016: Kumamoto Volters
- 2016–2017: Sendai 89ers
- 2017-2018: Bambitious Nara
- 2018-2019: Kumamoto Volters
- 2019-2021: Fukushima Firebonds
- 2021: Hiroshima Dragonflies
- 2021-2022: Niigata Albirex BB
- 2022: Kyoto Hannaryz
- 2023-present: Hiroshima Dragonflies

Career highlights
- 2× Second-team All-WAC (2014, 2015); WAC tournament MVP (2015)

Tshilidzi Kawata (born 10 June 1989) formerly known as Tshilidzi Nephaweis, is a South African-Japanese professional basketball player for the Hiroshima Dragonflies of the Japanese B.League.

Nephawe attended Mphaphuli Secondary School near Thohoyandou and played for Limpopo‘s provincial teams at a young age. He went on to New Mexico State University, where he was a teammate of future NBA player Pascal Siakam.
