= Oaklands College =

Coordinates: 51.754°N 0.332°W

- Hertfordshire; United Kingdom

Information
- Type: Further education
- Motto: "Take on the World"
- Established: 1921; 105 years ago (as Hertfordshire County Council Agricultural Institute); 1991; 35 years ago (as Oaklands College)
- Ofsted: Reports
- Principal: Andrew Slade
- Deputy Principals: Harpreet Nagra; Paul McCormack
- Staff: 501-1,000
- Gender: Mixed
- Age: 16+
- Enrolment: Approx. 6,000 students
- Colors: Cyan and Black
- Website: http://www.oaklands.ac.uk/

Oaklands College is a further education college in Hertfordshire, United Kingdom. It was established in 1991 when further education was reorganised. The college has campuses in St Albans and Welwyn Garden City, with a further provision in Borehamwood. Over 10,000 students study at the college annually, studying full time, part time and higher education courses as well as apprenticeships.

== History ==
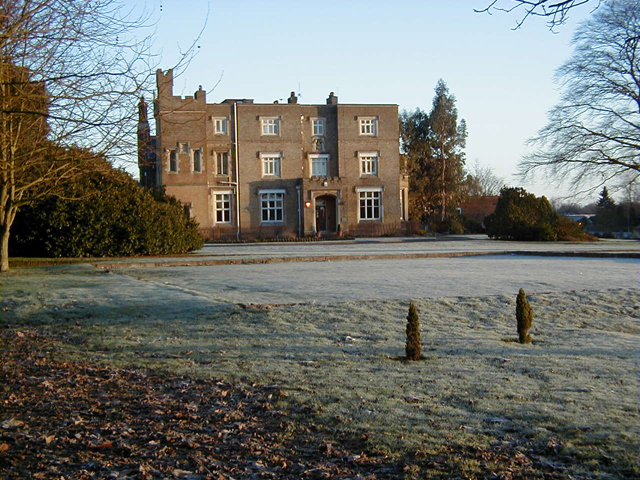
The historic Mansion House at the St Albans Campus, dating back to the 1800s.

The site of the current St Albans Campus in Smallford, including the historic Mansion House, was purchased by Hertfordshire County Council in 1920. The site opened a year later as the Hertfordshire County Council Agricultural Institute to provide full and part-time courses for home and overseas students. The college was founded by John Hunter Smith, who also served as its first principal. In February 1926, a fire broke out in the roof of the Mansion House, resulting in the gabled roof being replaced by the flat roof which exists today. The college later became known as the Hertfordshire College of Agriculture and Horticulture.

In the 1930s, a rugby football team was established by the college. The Museum of English Rural Life has a collection of dairying equipment for processing milk and making cheese used at the college, plus account books covering the 1930s to 1960s. In the 1950s, the college's offering was expanded to include courses such as the arts and construction trades.

On 1 April 1991, Oaklands was officially established by the merger of Hertfordshire College of Agriculture and Horticulture, De Havilland College in Welwyn Garden City and St Albans City College, when further education in Hertfordshire was reorganised and the three sites became campuses of the newly established Oaklands. Oaklands retained all three sites following the merger, with the De Havilland Campus later being renamed the Welwyn Garden City Campus. It also acquired a small site in Harpenden which has since closed. In December 2002, a fire broke out at the St Albans City Campus; the site was later closed in the mid-2000s. The area is now occupied by housing near the city centre. With the closure of this site, the college moved all course offerings to the current St Albans Campus in Smallford and the Welwyn Garden City Campus.

== Courses ==
The college offers a wide range of BTEC courses covering different sector subject areas including art, beauty, business, construction, equine studies, engineering, health and social care, hospitality and catering, public services, IT, agriculture, media, performing arts, science, maths and sport. Oaklands also offers apprenticeships as well as a range of A Level subjects. The college has 14 to 19 and 16 to 19-year-old consortium arrangements with local secondary schools in Welwyn Garden City, Hatfield and St Albans.

The college is well respected with regards to its land-based provision, these include horticulture, greenkeeping, equine studies and animal management. Oaklands also provides a wide range of part-time courses as part of its adult community learning programme.

Oaklands College also offers tertiary qualifications such as foundation degrees, HNDs and HNCs, which are run in partnership with the University of Hertfordshire. Foundation degree students can progress onto a BA or BSc qualification at university.

The college also has its own sports academies, Oaklands Wolves. It offers sports such as athletics, basketball and rugby which can be joined by students enrolled on a full-time course. In 2019, it was announced that Oaklands would be working with Arsenal F.C. to offer a new football academy for female students aged 16–19.

In September 2023, the college launched three new T-Level courses: Management and Administration, Design and Development for Engineering and Manufacturing, and Education and Childcare. Six more T-Levels are planned to commence in September 2024, bringing the total T-Level courses offered to nine.

Oaklands College is an affiliate member of the Land Based Colleges Aspiring to Excellence (Landex).

== Campuses and facilities ==
Oaklands College is primarily based on two campuses, St Albans and Welwyn Garden City. It also owns a third site in Borehamwood. All sites are based in Hertfordshire.

=== St Albans Campus ===
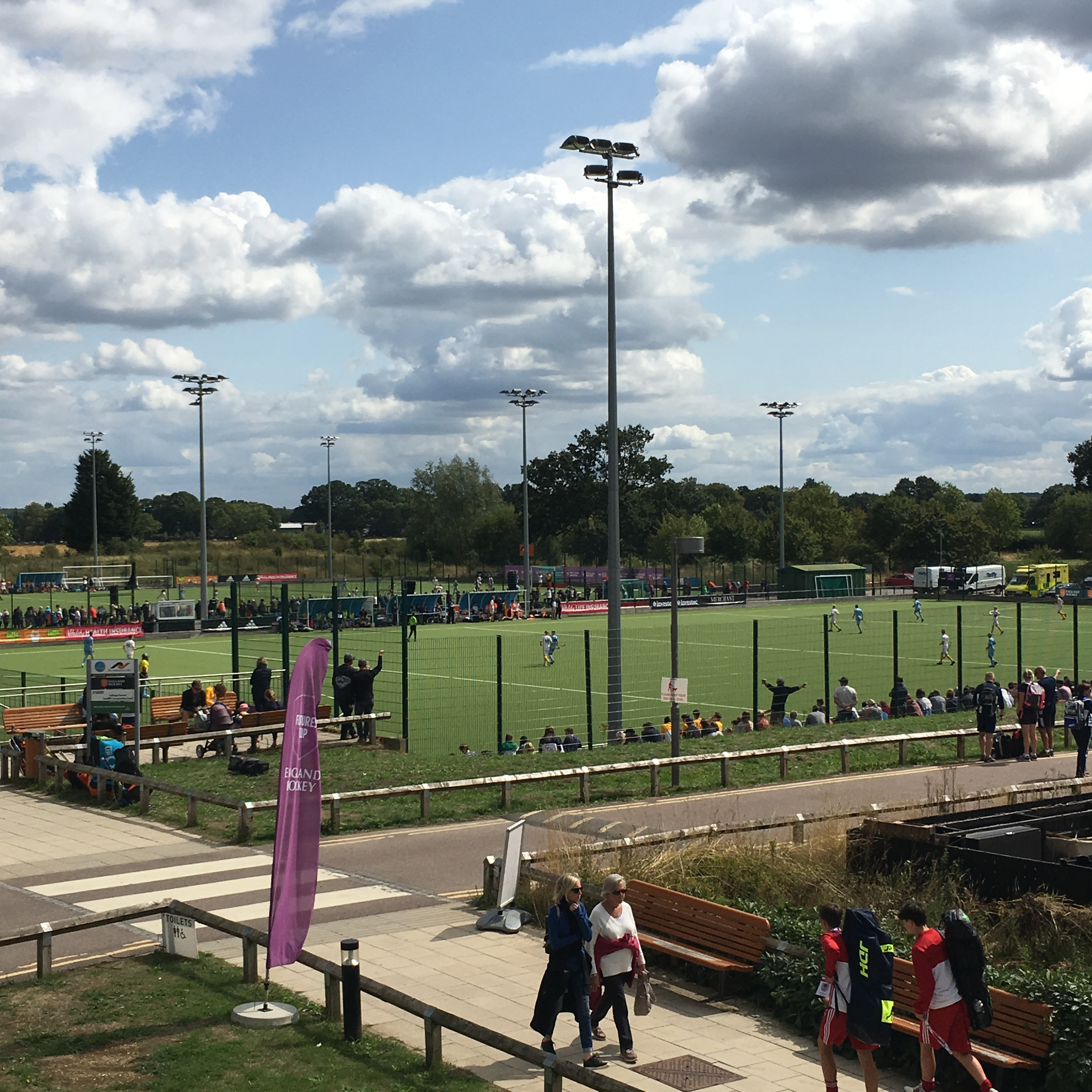
The astro-turf pitches at the St Albans Campus.

The historic Mansion House remains at the St Albans Campus, dating back to the 19th century. The campus also houses a large sports centre, equipped with a gym, multi-purpose sports hall and astro pitches, which opened in 2013 as part of the Discovery Centre building. The Stables Restaurant, a student-run restaurant is also based at the St Albans Campus which is open to the public.

In November 2017, the college gained permission for a multi-million-pound redevelopment of the St Albans Campus. The new build will consist of new student accommodation, administration areas, teaching centres, workshops and a sports pavilion. The development began in 2018, and will continue over a period of five years comprising four phases.

A cordoned-off area of derelict greenhouses was demolished in 2018 to make way for the new student residential block, for which construction started later that year. It was officially opened in 2020, providing student accommodation for around 80 students. Some student residential houses were demolished in late-2019 to make way for a large teaching block, which opened to students in November 2021.

=== Welwyn Garden City Campus ===
The Welwyn Garden City Campus is located in a central location near the town centre. The college's Engineering Resource Centre at the Welwyn Garden City Campus was officially opened in 2015, featuring new engineering workshops and welding facilities. The Welwyn-based Oasis Salon opened in 2010; this is run by hair and beauty students and is open to the public to book treatments.

=== Borehamwood ===
In 2019 the college opened its doors to the new Borehamwood site, offering courses such as construction, business, English as a second language and many part-time and evening courses.

== Organisation and administration ==
The college corporation oversees all aspects of the college and is responsible for appointing the principal. The principal oversees its day-to-day running. The current corporation chair is Peter Thompson. Andrew Slade is the tenth and current principal of Oaklands College, having assumed office on 1 September 2021.

The following people have served in a permanent role as principal of Oaklands College, or its predecessor, Hertfordshire College of Agriculture and Horticulture. The incumbent is shown in bold.

- John Hunter Smith (1921–50)
- Rowland Line (1950–55)
- Eric Pelham (1955–79)
- Richard Blossom (1979–91)
- Keith Gardner (1991–97)
- Liz Cristofoli (1997-2001)
- Helen Parr (2001–04)
- Mark Dawe (2005–10)
- Zoe Hancock (2011–21)
- **Andrew Slade** (2021-)

== Notable alumni ==
Oaklands has been associated with a range of notable alumni and staff in a number of disciplines.

- Olivia Breen
- Joel Kpoku
- Ben Lawson
- Maria Lyle
- Daryll Neita
- Jack Singleton
- Jordan Thomas
- Alan Titchmarsh
