= Yoshinori Shimizu (basketball) =

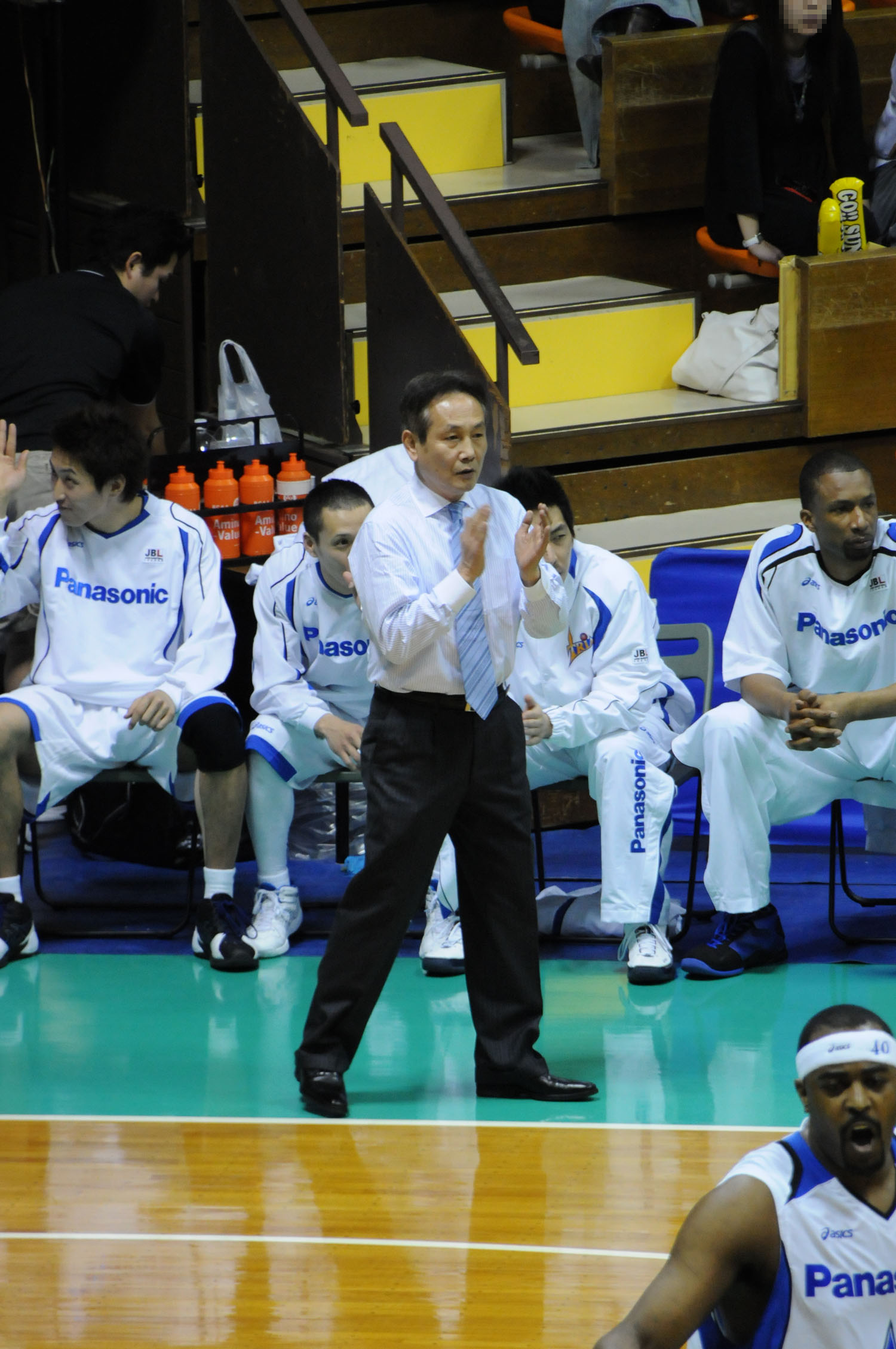
- Shimizu in 2009

Osaka Evessa
- Position: General manager
- League: B.League

Personal information
- Born: December 21, 1949 (age 76) Kameoka, Kyoto

Career information
- High school: Higashiyama (Kyoto, Kyoto)
- College: Nippon Sport Science University
- Playing career: 1971–1978

Career history

Playing
- 1971-1978: Matsushita Electric

Coaching
- 2008-2009: Toyama Grouses
- 1978-1980: Matsushita Electric (asst)
- 1980-1995: Matsushita Electric
- 1991-1995: Japan national basketball team
- 1996-2002: Hitachi Totsuka Leopard
- 2005-2013: Panasonic Trians
- 2013-2014: Nagoya Diamond Dolphins (asst)
- 2014-2016: Kumamoto Volters

Career highlights
- As player: 2x JBL Champions; As coach: 9x JBL Champions

Yoshinori Shimizu (清水良規, Shimizu Yoshinori) is a Japanese professional basketball executive and former player, currently serving as the general manager of the Osaka Evessa of the Japanese B.League.

== Head coaching record ==
Legend
Regular season	G	Games coached	W	Games won	L	Games lost	W–L %	Win–loss %
Playoffs	PG	Playoff games	PW	Playoff wins	PL	Playoff losses	PW–L %	Playoff win–loss %

Team	Year	G	W	L	W–L%	Finish	PG	PW	PL	PW–L%	Result
Matsushita Electric	1980	10	9	1	.900	-	-	-	-	–	JBL Champions
Matsushita Electric	1981	10	10	0	1.000	-	-	-	-	–	JBL Champions
Matsushita Electric	1982	15	13	2	.867	-	-	-	-	–	Runners-up
Matsushita Electric	1983	10	10	0	1.000	-	-	-	-	–	JBL Champions
Matsushita Electric	1984	14	14	0	1.000	-	-	-	-	–	JBL Champions
Matsushita Electric	1985	14	11	3	.786	-	-	-	-	–	JBL Champions
Matsushita Electric	1986	14	13	1	.929	-	-	-	-	–	JBL Champions
Matsushita Electric	1987	14	12	2	.857	-	-	-	-	–	JBL Champions
Matsushita Electric	1988	15	14	1	.933	1st in C	-	-	-	–	Runners-up
Matsushita Electric	1989	15	13	2	.867	1st in T	-	-	-	–	JBL Champions
Matsushita Electric	1990	15	13	2	.867	1st in C	-	-	-	–	Runners-up
Matsushita Electric	1991	15	13	2	.867	1st in T	-	-	-	–	Runners-up
Matsushita Electric	1992	22	12	10	.545	-	-	-	-	–	4th
Matsushita Electric	1993	10	9	1	.526	1st in T	-	-	-	–	7th
Matsushita Electric	1994	16	13	3	.813	1st in C	-	-	-	–	JBL Champions
Matsushita Electric	1995	16	12	4	.750	1st in T	-	-	-	–	7th
Matsushita Kangaroos	2005	26	9	17	.346	7th	-	-	-	–	7th
Matsushita Kangaroos	2006	26	13	11	.542	4th	3	1	2	.333	4th
Panasonic Trians	2007-08	35	18	17	.514	5th	-	-	-	–	5th
Panasonic Trians	2008-09	35	22	13	.629	3rd	3	1	2	.333	3rd
Panasonic Trians	2009-10	42	25	17	.595	3rd	3	1	2	.333	3rd
Panasonic Trians	2010-11	36	26	10	.722	3rd	-	-	-	–	-
Panasonic Trians	2011-12	42	24	18	.571	4th	3	1	2	.333	4th
Panasonic Trians	2012-13	42	20	22	.476	5th	-	-	-	–	5th
Kumamoto Volters	2014-15	54	6	48	.111	6th in Western	-	-	-	–	-
Kumamoto Volters	2015-16	49	13	36	.265	10th	-	-	-	–	-
