= Shinji Tomiyama =

Japanese basketball coach

Osaka Evessa
- Position: Associate coach
- League: B.League

Personal information
- Born: May 12, 1981 (age 45) Shinjuku, Tokyo

Career information
- College: Rikkyo University

Career history

Coaching
- 2009: Nippon Tornadoes (asst)
- 2009-2010: Tokyo Apache (asst)
- 2011-2012: Iwate Big Bulls (asst)
- 2012: Iwate Big Bulls
- 2012: Nippon Tornadoes (asst)
- 2012-2013: Chiba Jets
- 2013-2014: Kumamoto Volters (asst)
- 2014-2018: Toyota Alvark (asst)
- 2018-: Osaka Evessa (associate)

Career highlights

Shinji Tomiyama (冨山晋司, Tomiyama Shinji) (born 1981) is the associate coach of the Osaka Evessa in the Japanese B.League.

== Head coaching record ==
Legend
| Regular season | G | Games coached | W | Games won | L | Games lost | W–L % | Win–loss % |
| Playoffs | PG | Playoff games | PW | Playoff wins | PL | Playoff losses | PW–L % | Playoff win–loss % |

| Team | Year | G | W | L | W–L% | Finish | PG | PW | PL | PW–L% | Result |
|---|---|---|---|---|---|---|---|---|---|---|---|
| Iwate Big Bulls | 2012 | 26 | 12 | 14 | .462 | 7th in Eastern | - | - | - | – | - |
| Chiba Jets | 2012-13 | 52 | 26 | 26 | .500 | 6th in Eastern | 3 | 1 | 2 | .333 | Lost in 1st round |
| Kumamoto Volters | 2014 | 2 | 0 | 2 | .000 | Fired | - | - | - | – | - |
