= Ben Lawson (basketball) =

British basketball player

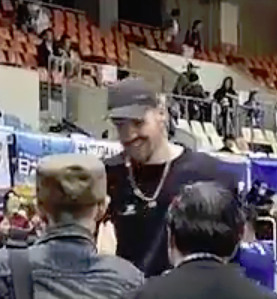

No. 34 – Yokohama Excellence
- Position: Center
- League: B.League

Personal information
- Born: 12 June 1995 (age 31) Welwyn Garden City, England
- Listed height: 7 ft 1 in (2.16 m)
- Listed weight: 260 lb (118 kg)

Career information
- High school: Hitchin Boys School (Hertfordshire, England) Oaklands College (Hertfordshire, England)
- College: Western Kentucky (2013–2017)
- NBA draft: 2017: undrafted
- Playing career: 2017–present

Career history
- 2017–2018: Lefke Avrupa Üniversitesi
- 2018–2019: Rizing Zephyr Fukuoka
- 2019–2020: Toyotsu Fighting Eagles Nagoya
- 2020: Koshigaya Alphas
- 2020: Kyoto Hannaryz
- 2021: Toyotsu Fighting Eagles Nagoya
- 2021–2023: Kumamoto Volters
- 2023–2025: Fukui Blowinds
- 2025–: Yokohama Excellence

Benjamin Ethan Lawson (born 12 June 1995) is a British professional basketball player who plays for the Yokohama Excellence of the B.League in Japan. He played college basketball for Western Kentucky. Standing at 7 ft 1 in (2.16 m), Lawson plays the power forward / center positions.

== High school career ==
Oaklands College (2011–13)

Lawson's basketball career began at Oaklands College in St. Albans, England. He averaged 15 points, 11 rebounds, and 4.7 blocks during the 2012–13 season. Shot 45 percent from the floor and 40 percent from three-point range; season highs were 32 points and 21 rebounds.

== College career ==
Western Kentucky (2013–17)

Lawson played for Western Kentucky. As a senior, he averaged 5.3 points and 3.3 rebounds per game. Lawson finished his college career with 185 blocks, ranking fourth on WKU’s all-time list.

== Professional career ==
European University of Lefke (2017–18)

Played his first professional season with the European University of Lefke in the North Cyprus first league. Lawson hit the decisive game winning shot in the playoff series, sending EUL into the Championship final.

Fukuoka Rizing Zephyr (2018–19)

Lawson played his second professional season with Rizing Zephyr Fukuoka in Japan. He appeared in 44 games (43 starts) and averaged 15 points, 10.5 rebounds, 1.9 assists, 1.18 steals, and 1.7 blocks in 34.6 minutes; he shot 49.8 percent from the field and 68.8 percent from the free throw line in the Japanese B.League. Lawson scored in double figures 40 times, including 6 games with at least 20 points; he grabbed double-digit rebounds 21 times and posted 20 double-doubles.

Memphis Grizzlies NBA Summer League (2019)

Lawson competed with the Memphis Grizzlies in the NBA Summer League in Salt Lake City and Las Vegas. Memphis became the NBA Summer League Champions on 15 July 2019. Earning quality minutes in the tournament, Lawson was an integral part of the Grizzlies run to the final.

== National team career ==
In 2013, Lawson and Basketball England played in Latvia for the 2013 FIBA Europe Under-18 Championship. In a valuable and experience-gaining tournament, Lawson and the team finished 9th out of 16th. In a historic overtime game Vs Spain, England were victors 75–66.

The 2014 FIBA Europe Under-20 Championship was hosted by Crete, Greece. After a promising group stage with Great Britain placing 2nd, Lawson sustained a back injury leaving him out of action until the last two remaining games of the tournament. Great Britain finished 11th out of 20.

Italy was the location for the 2015 FIBA Europe Under-20 Championship. The team finished 15th in the tournament; Lawson had a standout game of 11 points and 9 rebounds against Germany.

== Personal life ==
Having been a rugby player from a young age, Lawson realised his body type had become less suited to rugby, and switched to basketball at the age of 15. He transferred over to Oaklands College from Hitchin Boys School at the age of 16 and spent 2011 – 2013 developing his game with the basketball academy and competing in the EABL (Elite Academy Basketball League). In the two years with Oaklands, he went from school to county, to regional, and then was invited to join the national team squads at U18 and U20. Lawson married former University of Utah and University of Hawaii Basketball player Rachael Morris in 2024. They have one daughter.

== Career statistics ==
Legend
GP	Games played	GS	Games started	MPG	Minutes per game
FG%	Field goal percentage	3P%	3-point field goal percentage	FT%	Free throw percentage
RPG	Rebounds per game	APG	Assists per game	SPG	Steals per game
BPG	Blocks per game	PPG	Points per game	**Bold**	Career high

Professional career

Year	Team	GP	GS	MPG	FG%	3P%	FT%	RPG	APG	SPG	BPG	PPG
2017–18	European University of Lefke*	42	42	28.4	.563	.327	.781	11.8	1.21	1.91	2.38	20.3
2018–19	Fukuoka Rizing Zephyr	44	43	34.6	.498	.200	.688	10.5	1.94	1.27	1.76	15.0
2019	Memphis Grizzlies	8	1	14.8	.412	.231	.729	5.50	0.12	0.62	0.75	6.12

*No official statistics accessible for the 2017–18 season.

National team career

Year	Team	GP	GS	MPG	FG%	3P%	FT%	RPG	APG	SPG	BPG	PPG
2012–13	Team England U18	3	2	23.3	.500	1.000	.750	2.7	0.3	3	1.3	6.7
2013	Team GB U18	7	7	14.2	.414	.000	.500	2.1	0.1	0.4	0.3	3.6
2014	Team GB U20	8	8	19.5	.400	.000	.812	4.2	0.9	0.8	1.6	5.1
2015	Team GB U20	9	9	25.3	.542	.000	.462	4.6	0.6	0.8	1.4	7.8

College career

Year	Team	GP	GS	MPG	FG%	3P%	FT%	RPG	APG	SPG	BPG	PPG
2013–14	Western Kentucky	12	2	7.9	.471	.000	.667	1.50	0.17	0.08	0.75	2.00
2014–15	Western Kentucky	32	8	18.8	.583	.000	.490	3.22	0.66	0.44	1.66	3.84
2015–16	Western Kentucky	34	11	16.1	.594	1.000	.767	3.29	0.38	0.32	1.91	5.03
2016–17	Western Kentucky	32	15	15.8	.569	.000	.643	3.25	0.22	0.44	1.78	5.28
Career	Western Kentucky	110	36	15.8	.575	.200	.650	3.06	0.39	0.36	1.67	4.43
