= Norm deSilva =

American basketball player and coach

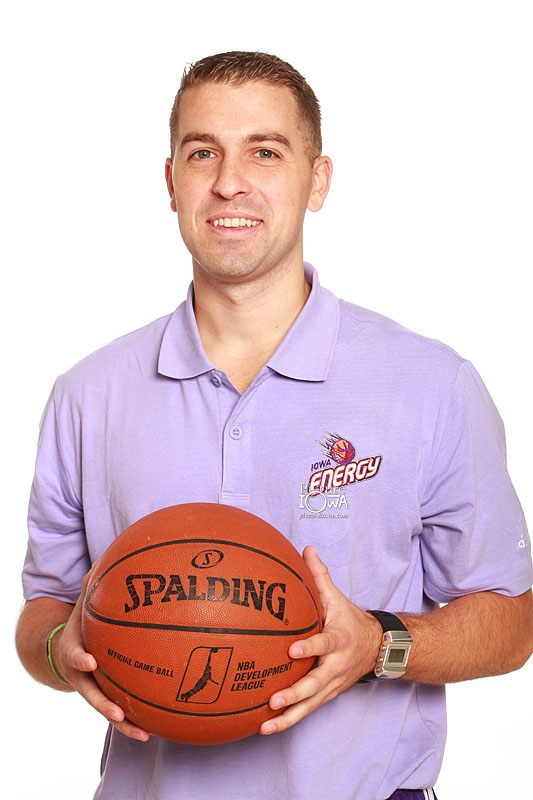

Personal information
- Born: August 20, 1985 (age 41) New Bedford, Massachusetts, U.S.
- Listed height: 5 ft 9 in (1.75 m)
- Listed weight: 171 lb (78 kg)

Career information
- High school: Dartmouth (Dartmouth, Massachusetts)
- College: Babson (2005–2009)
- Position: Point guard
- Coaching career: 2009–present

Career history

Coaching
- 2009–2010: University of New Haven (assistant)
- 2010–2011: Utah Flash (assistant)
- 2011–2012: Iowa Energy (assistant)
- 2012–2013: Foshan Dralions
- 2013–2014: Kumamoto Volters
- 2014–2017: Delaware 87ers (assistant)

Norman deSilva (born August 20, 1985) is an American basketball coach currently working for the San Antonio Spurs as an advance scout. He is also the subject of the feature-length documentary "Jiaolian: Coach".

== High school career ==
Born in New Bedford, Massachusetts, deSilva played his high school basketball at Dartmouth High School, and was a McDonald's High School All-American nominee his senior year. He helped lead his school to a Division 1 state semi-final appearance in Eastern Massachusetts.

== College career ==
In 2005, de Silva signed with Babson College. He started at point guard his freshmen year and led the league in assists in his sophomore season while also leading the nation in turnovers. He went on to earn a degree in finance.

== Coaching career ==
de Silva has been a head coach in both China and Japan. He has served as an assistant coach for the Utah Flash, Iowa Energy and Delaware 87ers, all members of the NBA D-League. Following his graduation from Babson College, he worked in Chicago at Tim Grover's NBA facility Attack Athletics in Chicago.

On October 31, 2014, deSilva was hired by the Delaware 87ers to be an assistant coach.

In 2017, deSilva served as a Consultant for CB Estudiantes in the Spanish ACB.

Since 2017, he has served as Advance Scout for the Philadelphia 76ers, Houston Rockets, Boston Celtics, and San Antonio Spurs.

== Documentary ==
de Silva is the subject of the documentary "Jiaolian: Coach" which is produced by Quebracho Productions. It follows de Silva through his turbulent season in China as head coach of the Foshan Long Lions in the Chinese Basketball Association. As the youngest head coach in league history, Jiàoliàn: Coach is a rare time-capsule of what it means for basketball in China at a time where age-old eastern practices are clashing with new western methods. The film has premiered in the New Hampshire Film Festival, Cape Cod Film Festival, Frozen River Film Festival, Sebestapol Film Festival, All Sport Film Festival, and DC Asian American Film Festival.

== Head coaching record ==
Legend
Regular season	G	Games coached	W	Games won	L	Games lost	W–L %	Win–loss %
Playoffs	PG	Playoff games	PW	Playoff wins	PL	Playoff losses	PW–L %	Playoff win–loss %

Team	Year	G	W	L	W–L%	Finish	PG	PW	PL	PW–L%	Result
Foshan Long Lions	2012–13	15	10	5	.667	9th	-	-	-	–	-
Kumamoto Volters	2013–14	44	5	39	.114	11th	-	-	-	–	-
