= Wakayama Trians =

- Founded: 1951
- History: Matsushita Electric Super Kangaroos; Matsushita Electric Panasonic Super Kangaroos; Panasonic Super Kangaroos; Panasonic Trians; Wakayama Trians
- Arena: Noritsu Arena Wakayama
- Capacity: 2,000
- Location: Hirakata, Osaka(1951-2013); Wakayama, Wakayama(2013-)
- Main sponsor: Noritsu
- Championships: 13
- Website: w-trians.com
Uniform	Uniform

The Wakayama Trians are a basketball team based in Wakayama, Wakayama, formerly playing in the National Basketball League (Japan).

== Notable players ==
- Cyril Awere
- Paul Butorac (basketball)
- Ace Custis
- Takuya Kawamura
- Zane Knowles
- Yoshifumi Nakajima
- Michael Parker
- Rick Rickert
- Shingo Utsumi

=== Panasonic Trians players ===
- Makoto Akaho
- Makoto Hasegawa
- Juaquin Hawkins
- Jerald Honeycutt
- Dana Jones
- Tilo Klette
- Christian Maråker
- Charles O'Bannon
- Gerald Paddio
- Mark Sanford (basketball)
- Hirotaka Sato
- Nobunaga Sato
- Greg Stolt
- Jameel Watkins
- Daiji Yamada
- Akifumi Yamazaki

== Coaches ==
- Yoshinori Shimizu
- Paul Westhead
- Željko Pavličević
- Takatoshi Ishibashi (asst)

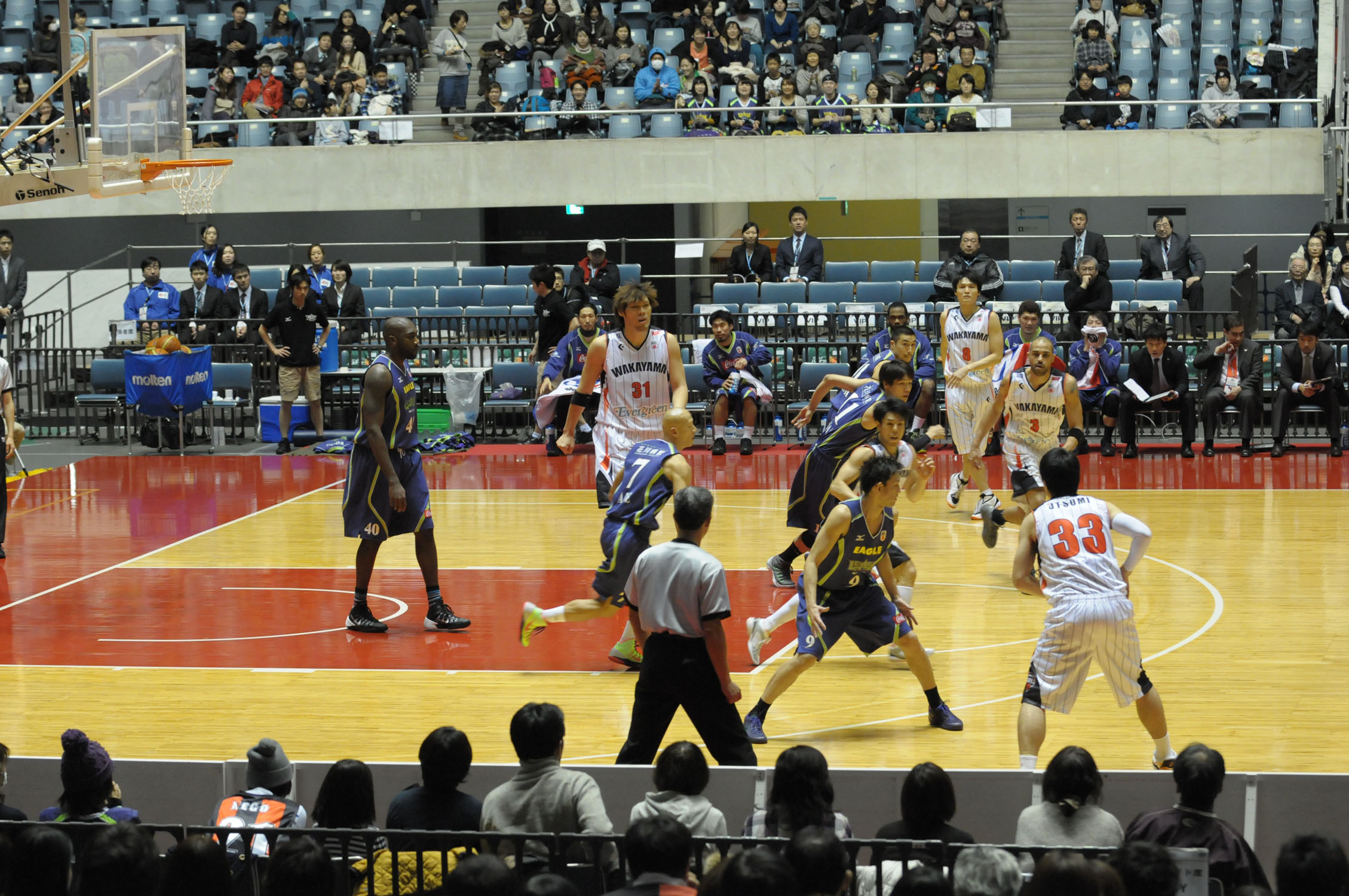
Wakayama Trians (white)
