= David Doblas =

Spanish basketball player

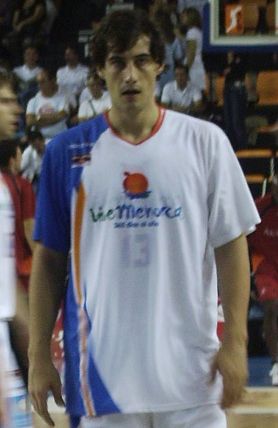
- Doblas with Menorca, in 2007.

No. 31 – Tokyo Hachioji Bee Trains
- Position: Center
- League: B.League

Personal information
- Born: August 6, 1981 (age 45) Santander, Cantabria
- Listed height: 6 ft 9 in (2.06 m)
- Listed weight: 286 lb (130 kg)

Career information
- College: University of Barcelona
- Playing career: 1999–present

Career history
- 1999–2000: Melilla
- 2000–2002: Rosalía de Castro
- 2003–2004: Granada
- 2004–2005: Ciudad de Algeciras
- 2005–2007: Gipuzkoa
- 2007: Menorca
- 2007–2016: Gipuzkoa
- 2016: Araberri
- 2016–2017: Doxa Lefkadas
- 2017–2018: Estudiantes Concordia
- 2018-2019: Levanga Hokkaido
- 2019: Aguada
- 2019-2020: Rizing Zephyr Fukuoka
- 2020-2021: Kumamoto Volters
- 2021: Bambitious Nara
- 2021–2022: Osaka Evessa
- 2022: CB Talavera
- 2022–2023: Shiga Lakes
- 2023–present: Tokyo Hachioji Bee Trains

Career highlights
- LEB Oro champion (2006)

David Jesús Doblas Portilla (born August 6, 1981 in Santander, Cantabria) is a Spanish professional basketball player who plays for Shiga Lakes of the Japanese B.League. At 2.09 m (6'10¼") and 124 kg (274 lbs.), he plays at the center position, but he can also play as a power forward, if needed.

== Professional career ==
In 2009, Doblas played in the NBA Summer League with the Toronto Raptors's Summer League team.

On 30 September 2016, Doblas penned a contract with Doxa Lefkadas of the Greek Basket League. However, despite the announcement, on 1 October 2016, he played in the first Spanish 2nd Division game with the Basque team Araberri, scoring 8 points and grabbing 7 rebounds, in their 87–76 win against Tau Castelló, before joining the Greek team.

== Honors ==
Clubs Honors

- Spanish 2nd Division Champion: (2005–06 with Bruesa GBC)
