= Ririe High School =

Ririe Junior-Senior High School

Location
- 13809 N 130 E Ririe, Idaho 83443; United States; 43.620525°N 111.776006°W

Information
- Type: Public
- School district: Ririe School District #252
- Principal: Kasey Teske
- Teaching staff: 22
- Grades: 7-12
- Enrollment: 350 (2023-24)
- Student to teacher ratio: 14.61
- Colors: Royal blue and gold
- Athletics: IHSAA 3A
- Athletics conference: Nuclear Conference
- Sports: Football, volleyball, cross country, wrestling, basketball, cheerleading, softball, golf, and track & field.
- Mascot: Bulldog
- Rival: West Jefferson Panthers, Firth Cougars, North Fremont Huskies
- Website: www.ririehigh.org

Ririe Jr./Sr. High School is a public school in Ririe, Idaho serving grades 7-12.

== History ==
Ririe High School has been a member of the Northwest Association of Accredited Schools since 1945.

It was the first school in USA history to sue to withdraw from a county School District. It won the suit in 1963 and formed its own independent school district, #252, with its own superintendent and school board.

== Campus ==
The Jr/Sr High School consists of one building with two primary areas: the north wing holds most classes for grades 7-8 and the south wing holds most classes for grades 9–12. There is also a separate agricultural shop building where career technical education classes are taught. All grades take physical education classes in the lone gymnasium on the campus.

== Extracurricular activities ==
=== Activities ===
Activities available to Ririe students include FFA, BPA, FCCLA, drama, band, choir, eSports & tabletop games, scholastic bowl, student council, honors society, Distinguished Young Women, and yearbook.

=== Athletics ===
The Ririe Bulldogs compete in the Nuclear Conference in the Idaho High School Activities Association 3A class and offer the following sports: football, volleyball, cross country, cheerleading, basketball, wrestling, softball, golf, and track & field.

== Curriculum ==
In addition to its regular curriculum, Ririe students can take career technical courses through College of Eastern Idaho with dual-credit general education courses also offered through Idaho Digital Learning Academy, College of Southern Idaho, and Brigham Young University - Idaho.
