= Don Beck (basketball) =

American professional basketball coach

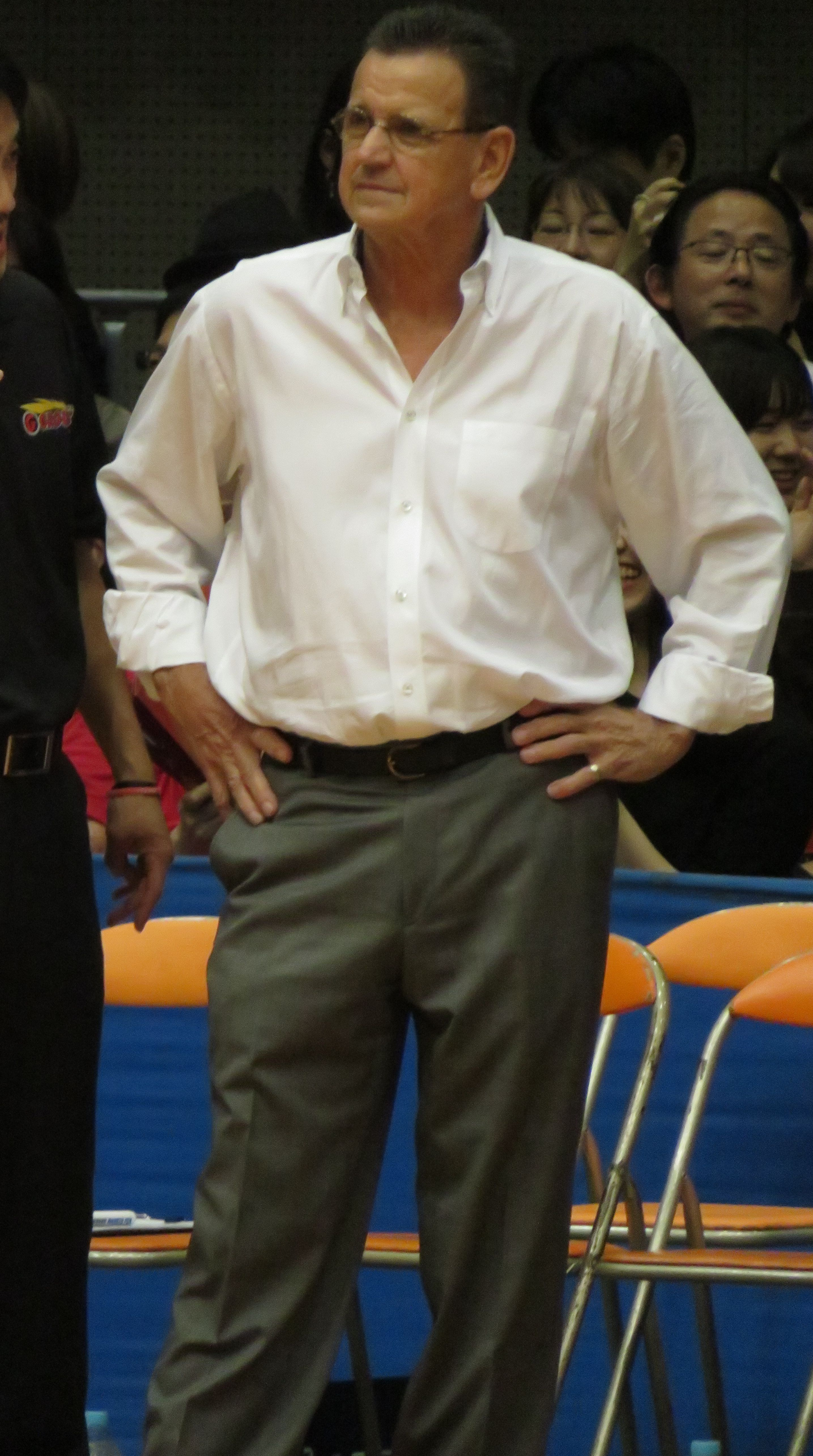
- Beck coaching Toyama Grouses in 2018

Personal information
- Born: June 2, 1953 (age 73) New York City, New York, United States
- Position: Coach
- Coaching career: 1978–present

Career history

Coaching
- 1978–1979: Santa Barbara CC (assistant)
- 1979–1980: Santa Barbara CC (women)
- 1981–1985: Bentley (assistant)
- 1985–1986: Rutgers (assistant)
- 1986–1990: Fresno State (assistant)
- 1990: Fresno State (interim co-head coach)
- 1992–1994: Oostende
- 1994–2001: TVG Trier
- 2001–2007: EWE Baskets Oldenburg
- 2002: Luxembourg
- 2007–2009: Euphony Bree
- 2009–2010: EiffelTowers Den Bosch
- 2010–2015: Toyota Alvark
- 2015–2018: Toyota Antelopes
- 2018–2020: Toyama Grouses
- 2021–2022: Kumamoto Volters
- 2023–2024: Gladiators Trier

Career highlights
- JBL champion (2012); JBL Coach of the Year (2012); Dutch Cup champion (2009); German DBB-Cup champion (1998, 2001)

Don Beck (born June 2, 1953) is an American professional basketball coach.

== Career ==
A 1975 Quinnipiac University graduate, Beck began his career on the sideline as assistant coach at Santa Barbara City College in 1978, before taking his first head coach position at Santa Barbara City College in 1979, where he coached the women's team during the 1979-80 season. Other assistant coach stints came at Bentley College (1981–85), Rutgers University (1985–86) and Fresno State University (1986–90). In March 1990, when head coach Ron Adams was released, Beck and Frank Carbajal were named Fresno State's interim co-head coaches for the remainder of the 1989-90 campaign.

In 1992, Beck was named head coach of Sunair Oostende, a first-division team from Belgium.

During his seven-year tenure at German Basketball Bundesliga side TVG Trier (1994–2001), Beck guided the team to two German Cup titles (1998 and 2001) and a trip to the Bundesliga semifinals in 1998. In 2001, Beck took the reins at fellow Bundesliga team EWE Baskets Oldenburg, where he worked until May 2007. In the summer of 2002, he served a four-month stint as head coach of the Luxembourg men's national team.

After parting ways with Oldenburg, Beck was named head coach of Euphony Bree of Belgium in 2007, where he stayed until January 2009 and served as head coach of the Eiffel Towers Den Bosch, a member of the Dutch top-flight Eredivisie, from January 2009 to April 2010, winning the Dutch cup competition in 2009.

From 2010 to 2015, Beck was at the helm of Japanese side Toyota Alvark. He received JBL Coach of the Year honors in the 2011–12 season after guiding the team to a championship title and led Alvark to a second-place finish in 2014–15. He served as head coach of the Toyota Antelopes in the Women's Japan Basketball League from 2015 to 2018 and then accepted the head coaching job with the Toyama Grouses of Japan's B.League in July 2018. He coached the Toyoma team until 2020. In May 2021, he was named head coach of the Kumamoto Volters of Japan's B2 league. Beck coached the team in the 2021-22 season.

On May 11, 2023, German ProA side Gladiators Trier announced the appointment of Don Beck as the club's new head coach. Beck returned to the town, where he had worked from 1994 until 2001. In the 2023-24 season, his Trier team fell just short of winning promotion to the German top-tier Bundesliga, dropping the ProA semi-final series in five games. Beck stepped down after one season at the helm of the Gladiators and was appointed the team's President of Basketball Operations. He parted ways with the Trier organization in August 2026.

== Head coaching record ==
Legend
Regular season	G	Games coached	W	Games won	L	Games lost	W–L %	Win–loss %
Playoffs	PG	Playoff games	PW	Playoff wins	PL	Playoff losses	PW–L %	Playoff win–loss %

Team	Year	G	W	L	W–L%	Finish	PG	PW	PL	PW–L%	Result
Toyota Alvark	2010–11	36	23	13	.639	3rd in JBL	-	-	-	–	-
Toyota Alvark	2011–12	42	29	13	.690	2nd in JBL	6	5	1	.833	JBL champions
Toyota Alvark	2012–13	42	32	10	.762	2nd in JBL	3	1	2	.333	3rd place
Toyota Alvark	2013–14	54	45	9	.833	2nd in NBL-E	5	2	3	.400	3rd place
Toyota Alvark	2014–15	54	40	14	.741	3rd in NBL-E	9	5	4	.556	Runners-up in NBL
Toyama Grouses	2018–19	60	32	28	.533	3rd in Central	2	0	2	.000	Lost in 1st round
Toyama Grouses	2019–20	41	17	24	.415	3rd in Central	-	-	-	–	-
