= Terrance Woodbury =

American basketball player (born 1987)

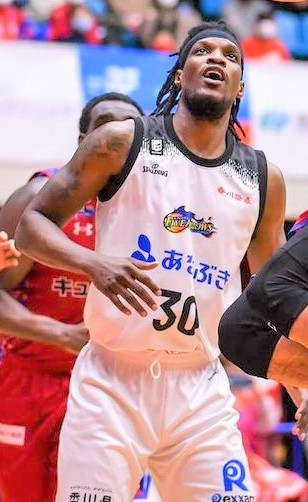

No. 30 – Shinshu Brave Warriors
- Position: Shooting guard / small forward
- League: B.League

Personal information
- Born: June 16, 1987 (age 39) Norfolk, Virginia, U.S.
- Listed height: 6 ft 7 in (2.01 m)
- Listed weight: 223 lb (101 kg)

Career information
- High school: Granby (Norfolk, Virginia); Coastal Christian Academy (Virginia Beach, Virginia)
- College: Georgia (2005–2009)
- NBA draft: 2009: undrafted
- Playing career: 2011–present

Career history
- 2011: LF Basket
- 2011–2012: Austin Toros
- 2012–2013: Ryukyu Golden Kings Okinawa
- 2013: Leones de Santo Domingo
- 2013–2014: Austin Toros
- 2014–2015: Shiga Lakestars
- 2015–2016: Hamamatsu Higashimikawa Phoenix
- 2017: Bambitious Nara
- 2017: Titanes del Licey
- 2017–2018: Kumamoto Volters
- 2018: Titanes del Licey
- 2018–2022: Kagawa Five Arrows
- 2019: Metropolitanos de Mauricio Báez
- 2022–2024: Kumamoto Volters
- 2024–present: Shinshu Brave Warriors

Career highlights
- NBA D-League champion (2012); bj League All-star MVP (2015); bj League 6th Man (2012–13); B2 League MVP (2021–2022)

Terrance Woodbury (born June 16, 1987) is an American professional basketball player for the Shinshu Brave Warriors of the B.League. Born in Norfolk, Virginia, he played at Granby High School in Norfolk, with his senior season at Coastal Christian Academy in Virginia Beach, Virginia. He then played college basketball at the University of Georgia.

== Professional ==
Woodbury went undrafted in the 2009 NBA draft and subsequently did not play professionally in 2009–10. In 2010, he joined AZS Koszalin of Poland but left before the start of the regular season. In December 2010, he joined Oberwart Gunners of Austria but left before appearing in a game for them. In January 2011, he joined LF Basket of Sweden for the rest of the 2010–11 season. In November 2011, he was acquired by the Austin Toros. In 2012, he joined Ryukyu Golden Kings Okinawa of Japan for the 2012–13 season. Following the conclusion of the Japanese season, he joined Leones de Santo Domingo of the Dominican Republic. In November 2013, he was re-acquired by the Austin Toros.
