= Kevin Kotzur =

American basketball player

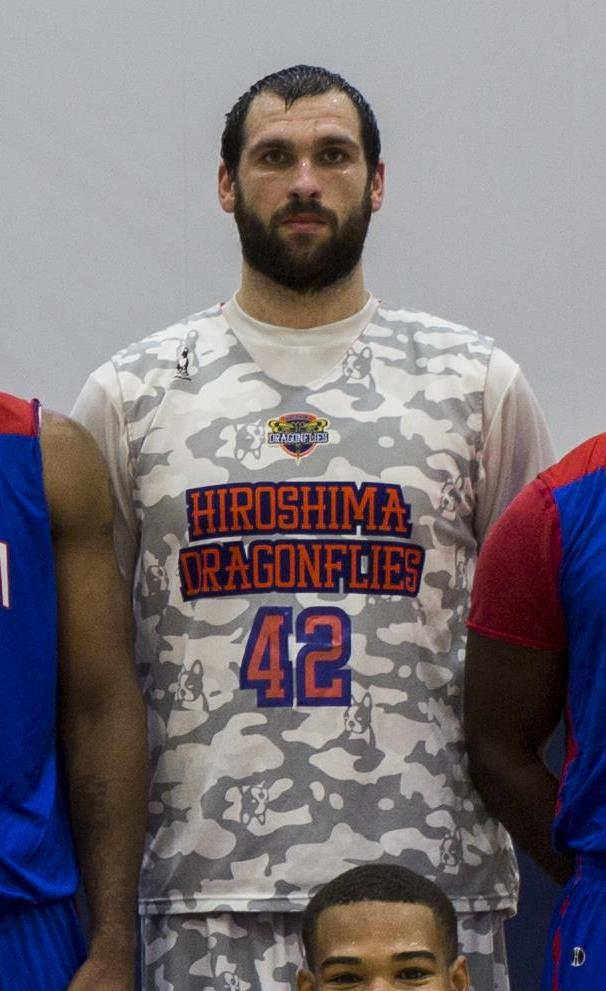

Free agent
- Position: Power forward / center

Personal information
- Born: November 3, 1989 (age 37) La Vernia, Texas, U.S.
- Listed height: 6 ft 8 in (2.03 m)
- Listed weight: 260 lb (118 kg)

Career information
- High school: La Vernia (La Vernia, Texas)
- College: St. Mary's (Texas) (2008–2013)
- NBA draft: 2013: undrafted
- Playing career: 2013–present

Career history
- 2013–2014: Santa Cruz Warriors
- 2014–2017: Kyoto Hannaryz
- 2017–2018: Hiroshima Dragonflies
- 2018–2019: Aisin AW Areions Anjo
- 2019–2021: Kagawa Five Arrows
- 2021–2022: Altiri Chiba
- 2022–2023: Kumamoto Volters
- 2023: Altiri Chiba
- 2023: Yamagata Wyverns
- 2023: Rizing Zephyr Fukuoka
- 2024–2025: Kanazawa Samuraiz

Career highlights
- B2 Rebound Leader (2020)

Kevin James Kotzur (born November 3, 1989) is an American professional basketball player for Kanazawa Samuraiz of the B.League.

Kotzur was born and raised in La Vernia, Texas.

On August 23, 2019, Kotzur signed with Kagawa Five Arrows of the B.League.

On October 25, 2024, Kotzur signed with Kanazawa Samuraiz of the B.League.
