= Moriyama Citizens Gymnasium =

Arena in Moriyama, Shiga, Japan

Coordinates: 35°3′53.8″N 135°58′46.2″E

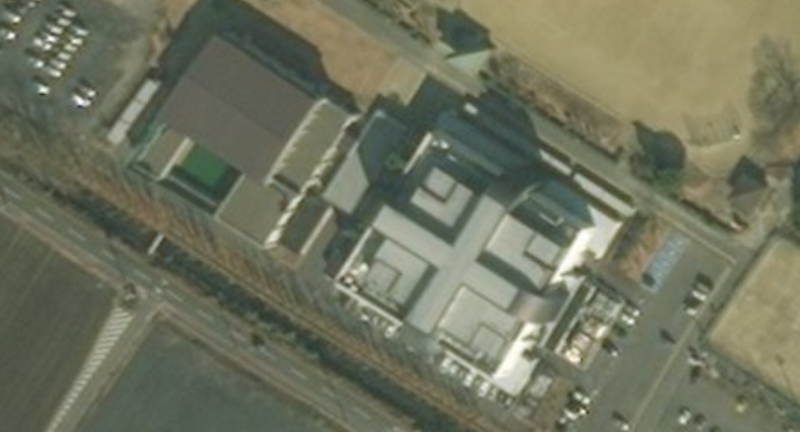
- Interactive map of Moriyama Citizens Gymnasium
- Full name: Moriyama Citizens Gymnasium
- Location: Moriyama, Shiga, Japan
- Owner: Moriyama city
- Operator: Moriyama city
- Capacity: 3,000

Construction
- Opened: October 31, 1977
- Renovated: October 2007
- Cost

Website
- http://www.moriyama-s-p.com/sisetu/roomA/

Moriyama Citizens Gymnasium is an arena in Moriyama, Shiga, Japan.
