= Joel James (basketball) =

American basketball player (born 1994)

U.D. Oliveirense
- Position: Center
- League: Liga Portuguesa de Basquetebol

Personal information
- Born: January 22, 1994 (age 32) West Palm Beach, Florida
- Listed height: 6 ft 11 in (2.11 m)
- Listed weight: 280 lb (127 kg)

Career information
- High school: William T. Dwyer (Palm Beach Gardens, Florida)
- College: North Carolina (2012–2016)
- NBA draft: 2016: undrafted
- Playing career: 2016–present

Career history
- 2016–2017: Kumamoto Volters
- 2018: Tokyo Hachioji Trains
- 2019: Rayos de Hermosillo
- 2019–2020: Capitanes de Ciudad de México
- 2020–2021: Düzce Belediye
- 2021–2022: TED Ankara Kolejliler
- 2022: Hamilton Honey Badgers
- 2022–2023: Parma Basket
- 2023: Freseros de Irapuato
- 2023–present: U.D. Oliveirense

Joel James (born January 22, 1994) is an American professional basketball player for U.D. Oliveirense of the Liga Portuguesa de Basquetebol. In 2018 he began doing basketball color commentary for the ACC Network.

James played four years at the University of North Carolina at Chapel Hill, where he averaged 8.8 minutes, 2.2 points and 2.3 rebounds per game. Though not a leading scorer, his personality and antics were popular among viewers and students. He is married to former UNC softball player Aquilla Mateen.

== Career statistics ==
Legend
GP	Games played	GS	Games started	MPG	Minutes per game
FG%	Field goal percentage	3P%	3-point field goal percentage	FT%	Free throw percentage
RPG	Rebounds per game	APG	Assists per game	SPG	Steals per game
BPG	Blocks per game	PPG	Points per game	**Bold**	Career high

=== College ===
Year	Team	GP	GS	MPG	FG%	3P%	FT%	RPG	APG	SPG	BPG	PPG
2012–13	North Carolina	30	3	9.4	**.509**	-	.563	2.4	**.2**	**.2**	**.3**	2.2
2013–14	North Carolina	30	**13**	7.9	.388	-	**.778**	**2.7**	**.2**	.1	.1	1.7
2014–15	North Carolina	**38**	3	**10.1**	.451	-	.667	1.9	**.2**	.1	.2	**2.5**
2015–16	North Carolina	37	10	7.8	.435	-	.522	2.3	0	0	.2	2.2
**Career**		135	29	8.8	.452	-	.627	2.3	.1	.1	.2	2.2
