= Shiga Lakes =

Professional basketball team in Otsu, Shiga Prefecture, Japan

- Conference: West
- Division: First
- Leagues: B.League
- Founded: 2008; 18 years ago
- History: bj league (2008–2016)
- Arena: Shiga Daihatsu Arena
- Capacity: 5,000
- Location: Ōtsu, Shiga
- Team colors: Blue, Yellow, Platinum
- Main sponsor: Sun Chlorella
- President: (Japan) Shinsuke Sakai
- Head coach: Kenjirō Maeda
- Championships: 1 (2024)
- Website: lakestars.net/
Home	Away	3rd

Former logo

The Shiga Lakes (滋賀レイクス), officially the Shiga Lakestars (滋賀レイクスターズ), are a Japanese professional basketball team based in Ōtsu, Shiga Prefecture. The team competes in the B.League Premier, the highest division of the B.League, as a member of the Western Conference. The team plays its home games at Shiga Daihatsu Arena.

== Arenas ==
- Shiga Daihatsu Arena
- Ukaruchan Arena
- Moriyama Citizens Gymnasium
- Proceed Arena Hikone
- Hikone Citizens Sports Center
- YMIT Arena

== Practice facilities ==
- Shiga Bank Gymnasium

== Coaches ==
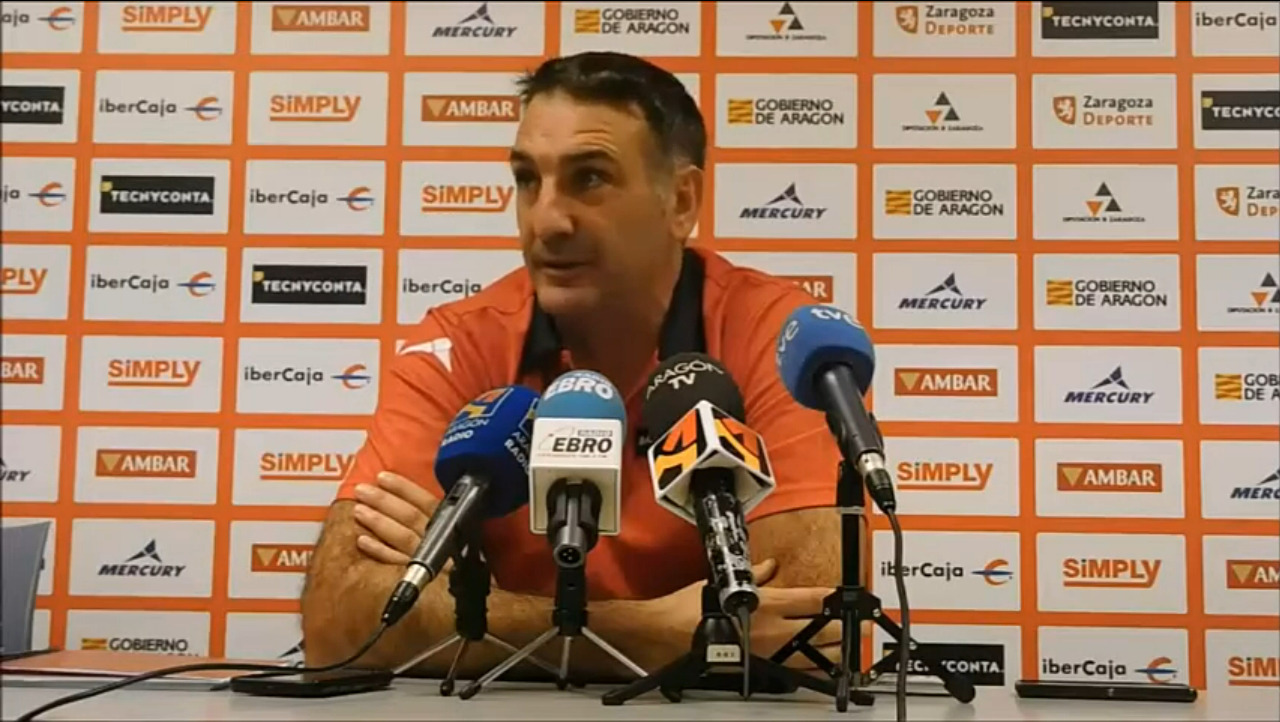
Luis Guil

- Bob Pierce (2008–10)
- Takatoshi Ishibashi
- Hirokazu Nema
- Al Westover (2011–13)
- Chris Boettcher (2013–14)
- Koto Toyama (2014–17)
- Shawn Dennis (2017-2021)
- Luis Guil (2021–2022)
- Takayuki Yasuda (2022-)

== Roster ==
Shiga Lakes roster
Players
Coaches

Pos.	No.	Nat.	Name	Ht.	Age
F	1	(United States)	Kelvin Martin	1.96 m (6 ft 5 in)	37 – 10 September 1989
PG	7	(Japan)	Kai Toews	1.88 m (6 ft 2 in)	28 – 17 September 1998
SF	9	(Japan)	Yusei Sugiura	1.96 m (6 ft 5 in)	31 – 24 June 1995
C	13	(Spain)	David Doblas	2.08 m (6 ft 10 in)	45 – 6 August 1981
PG	14	(Japan)	Teppei Kashiwagura (C)	1.80 m (5 ft 11 in)	31 – 20 January 1995
G	15	(Philippines)	Kiefer Ravena	1.81 m (5 ft 11 in)	33 – 27 October 1993
PG	16	(Japan)	Daichi Nomoto	1.83 m (6 ft 0 in)	28 – 25 June 1998
SG	17	(Japan)	Kyosuke Hoshino	1.83 m (6 ft 0 in)	27 – 1 June 1999
F	18	(United States)	DeQuan Jones	2.03 m (6 ft 8 in)	36 – 20 June 1990
C	25	(Croatia)	Ivan Buva	2.07 m (6 ft 9 in)	35 – 6 May 1991
SG	32	(Japan)	Yusuke Karino	1.84 m (6 ft 0 in)	36 – 18 April 1990
PG	34	(Japan)	Hayato Wakugawa	1.94 m (6 ft 4 in)	22 – 2 May 2004
SG	51	(Japan)	Kazuma Kanemoto	1.83 m (6 ft 0 in)	27 – 10 August 1999
SF	77	(Japan)	Naoto Moriyama	1.92 m (6 ft 4 in)	30 – 13 April 1996
C	99	(Japan)	Koya Kawamata	2.02 m (6 ft 8 in)	28 – 16 June 1998

Head coach

- (Spain) David Gomez

Assistant coach(es)

- (Japan) Atsushi Tajimi

Legend

- (C) Team captain
- Injured

- Roster
Updated: 2022 Dec 10

== Notable players ==
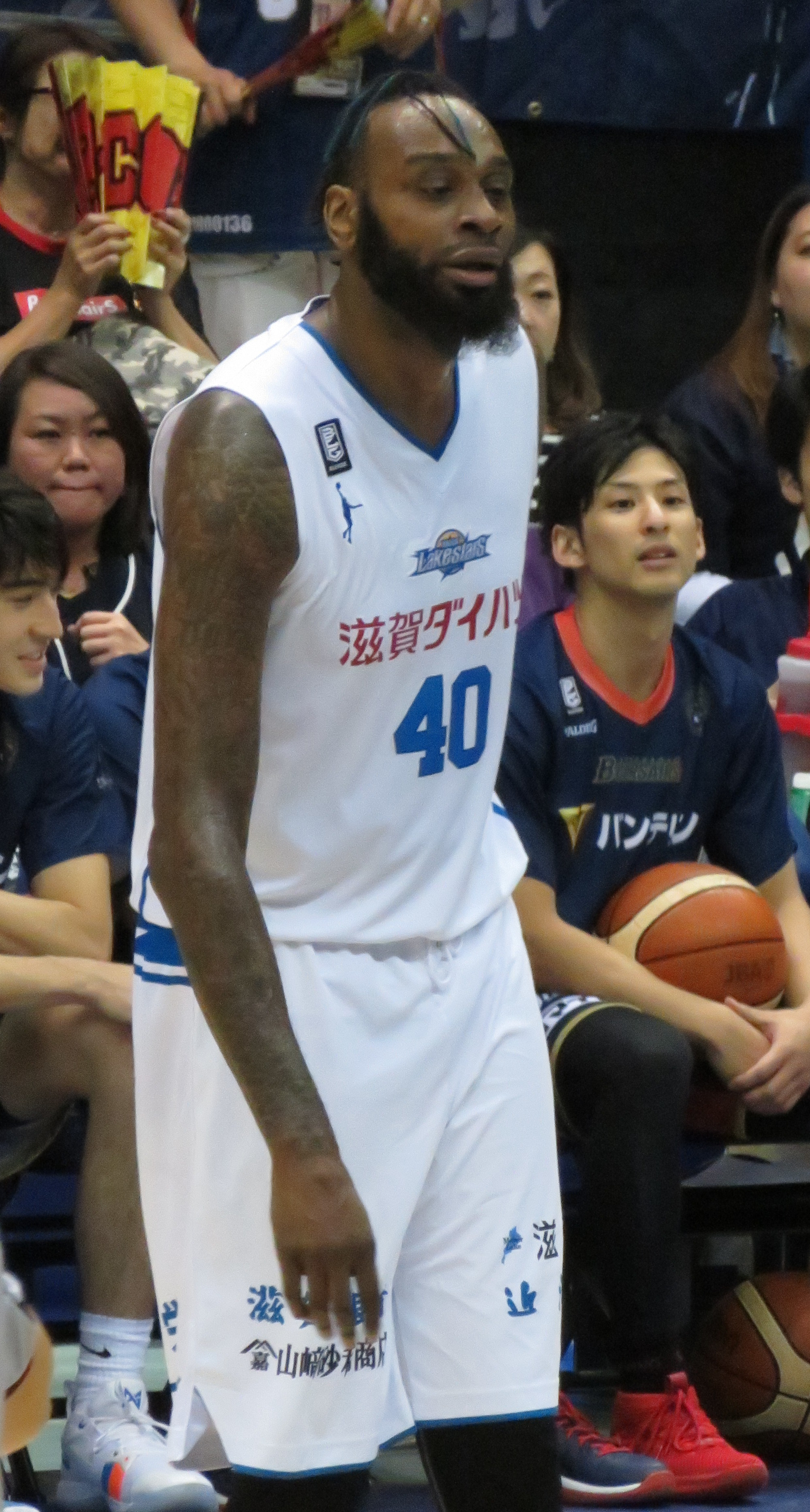
D'or Fischer

- Alfred Aboya
- Wayne Arnold
- Craig Brackins
- Marshall Brown
- Brandon Fields
- (United States) (Israel) D'or Fischer
- Dionisio Gomez
- Gary Hamilton
- Chris Holm
- Julian Mavunga
- Shinya Ogawa
- Lamar Rice
- Omar Samhan
- Hirotaka Sato
- David Weaver
- Jacob Wiley
- Terrance Woodbury
- Luke Zeller
