= Kumamoto Volters =

Japanese professional basketball team

- Conference: West
- Division: Second
- Leagues: B.League
- Founded: 2012
- Arena: Kumamoto Prefectural Gymnasium
- Capacity: 4,110
- Main sponsor: Nisikawa Group, Kumamoto
- Head coach: Kouto Tooyama
- Website: www.volters.jp
| Home | Away |

The Kumamoto Volters (熊本ヴォルターズ, Kumamoto Vorutāzu) is a Japanese professional basketball team in Kumamoto. The team competes in the B.League One, the second division of the B.League, as a member of the Southern Conference. The team name 'Kumamoto Volters' is a coined term combining 'VOLCANO' and 'WATER'. 'VOLCANO' refers to Mount Aso, one of the world’s leading caldera volcanoes, while 'WATER' refers to the abundant underground water, represented by Sirakawa Spring, a representative source of underground water, produced by Mount Aso. Both elements are positioned as symbols representing Kumamoto.

Kumamoto Volters have experienced one district championship in the B.League's second division and have advanced to the promotion playoffs to the first division six times.

The B.League helds 60 games per season, and during the 2024 - 25 season, the Kumamoto Volters drew a total attendance of 101,758, with an average of 3,392 spectators per games.

== History ==
=== Prior to the Club’s Establishment ===
Satosi Yunoue, who had been a junior high school teacher, was so impressed by the local enthusiasm for the NBA when he went to the United States to study educational techniques that he developed a strong desire to establish a professional basketball team in his hometown of Kumamoto. Yunoue resigned from teaching, and in 2009, an NPO was founded as a preparatory step toward establishing the club.

In September 2012, when the Yunoue's organization was approved to join the newly established domestic league, the National Basketball League(NBL), set to launch the following year in Japan, Yunoue founded Kumamoto Basketball Co., Ltd. as club's parent organization. The team was named 'Kumamoto Volters' throuth a public name contest.

=== The NBL Era ===
==== 2013-2014 season ====
The 12 teams were divided into two conferences—Eastern and Western—each consisting of six teams, and played a 54-games season. the Kumamoto Volters belonged to the Western conferences. Led by head coach Norm de Silva, the team entered the season with a mix of Japanese players and foreign imports, including Lamont Jones, DeVaughn Washington and Thomas Baudinet. However, the team struggled significantly, suffering a club-record 20-games losing streak. As a result, de Silva was dismissed mid-season, and the Volters finished with a record of 6 wins and 48 losses, placing 6th in the western conference.

==== 2014-2015 season ====
As in the previous season, the 12 teams were divided into Eastern and Western conferences and played a 54-game schedules. The Volters remained in the western conference. under new head coach Yosinori Simizu and assistant coach Takayuki Yasuda, the team entered the season with a mix of Japanese players and foreign imports, including Garlon Green, Cyril Awere and Joshu Warren. However, the team continued to struggle, suffering a series of losing streaks—14, 12, and 11 games respectively—making the second, third, and fourth worst in club history. They finished the season with the same record as the previous year: 6 wins and 48 losses, placing 6th in the western conference.

==== 2015-2016 season ====
The league abolished East - West conference system and adopted a round-robin format in which all 12 teams played 55 games. The Volters continued under head coach Yosinori Simizu and assistant head coach Takayuki Yasuda. The team entered the season with a mix of Japanese players and foreign imports, including DeVaughn Washington, Joshua Crawford and Tshilidzi Nephawe. Although they suffered an eight-game losing streak, they showed signs of improvement by securing 13 wins.

However, the Kumamoto earthquakes struck during the season, causing extensive damage throughout Kumamoto Prefecture. As it became impossible to continue playing under the circumstances, the Volters withdrew from the remainder of the season and finished with a record of 13 wins, 36 losses, and 6 forfeits. They placed 10th among the 12 teams in the league. Kumamoto Basketball Co., Ltd. faced an existential crisis, but thanks to strong support from local and nationwide fans, the organization overcame the adversity.

| Season | Head Coach | W | L | W% | GB (Note: GB reflects the difference from the division leader (playoffs cutoffs).) | pts | pts allowed | pt diffential | conf. ranking | overall ranking | total attendance | average attendance | note |
|---|---|---|---|---|---|---|---|---|---|---|---|---|---|
| 2013-14 | Norm de Silva→Sinji Tomiyama→Satosi Yunoue | 6 | 48 | .111 | 35.0(23.0) | 4,028 | 4,901 | -873 | 6/6 | 12/12 | 37,101 | 1,325 | |
| 2014-15 | Yosinori Simizu | 6 | 48 | .111 | 37.0(28.0) | 3,709 | 4,540 | -951 | 6/6 | 12/12 | 37,341 | 1,383 | |
| 2015-16 | Yosinori Simizu | 13 | 36 | .265 | 30.0 | 3,452 | 3,828 | -373 | - | 10/12 | 40,306 | 1,550 | forfeited 6 games |

=== The B.League Era ===
In 2016, Japan's professional basketball leagues were unified to form the B.League. A total of 36 teams were divided into two divisions, with each division further split into three geographic conferences: East, Central, and West. The Kumamoto Volters were placed in the B2 western conference, the lower of the two divisions. The total number of games in the season increased from 55 to 60.

==== 2016-2017 season ====
Takayuki Yasuda appointed head coach, and the team entered the season with a mix of Japanese players and foreign imports, including Paul Butorac, Reggie Warren and Joel James. After opening the season with three consecutive wins followed by a losing streak, the team made a remarkable surge, recording a club-record 13-game winning streak. Although their momentum slowed in the latter half of the season, they finished with a 44-16 record. Despite placing 3rd in their division and 5th overall, they did not qualify for the postseason.

==== 2017-2018 season ====
The B2 division maintained to operate with 18 teams divided into three geographic conferences, The Volters competed in the Western Conference.

Takayuki Yasuda remained as head coach, and the team entered the season with a mix of Japanese players and foreign imports, including Joel James, Josh Duinker, Terrance Woodbury, and Jordan Vandenberg. While the team struggled slightly in the first half, they gained momentum and went on a winning streak. Despite a six-game losing skid late in the season, the Volters finished with a 41-19 record, placing 2nd in the B2 Western Conference and 3rd overall, securing a spot in the postseason.

In the playoffs, they were eliminated in the semifinals. However, since the two teams that advanced to the finals did not hold licenses for promotion to the upper division, the Volters earned the right to play in the promotion/relegation game by winning the third-place game. They narrowly missed promotion after losing the match by three points.

==== 2018-2019 season ====
The B2 division maintained its three-conference structure consisting of 18 teams, with the Volters continuing to compete in the West Conference.

Head coach Takayuki Yasuda continued at the helm for the season. The team re-signed Josh Duinker and acquired Chehales Tapscott and Scott Morrison to bolster the roster. Maintaining a winning percentage above 70% throughout the majority of the season, the team concluded the regular season with a 45–15 record, clinching the first division title in club history and advancing to the postseason.

The Volters pushed their playoff semifinal series to a decisive Game 3, but were narrowly defeated by a one-point margin. However, as neither of the two teams that advanced to the Final held the required B1 license for promotion, the right to move up to the top division was granted to the winner of the third-place game. In that series, the Volters dropped Game 1 in overtime and were defeated again in Game 2, falling short of promotion. Head coach Takayuki Yasuda, who had declared prior to the season that this would be his final year if promotion was not achieved, stepped down following the conclusion of the campaign.

==== 2019-2020 season ====
The B2 division maintained its three-conference structure consisting of 18 teams, with the Volters continuing to compete in the West Conference.

Under newly appointed head coach Nenad Vučinić, the Volters entered the season with new foreign signings Bobby Jones, Gavin Ware, and David Weaver. The team suffered a loss in the season opener, and in the second round, a key Japanese player sustained a serious injury. Compounding their early struggles, Bobby Jones—who had been expected to be a primary scorer—failed to adjust to the playing environment in Japan and departed the team in November. As a result, the Volters endured a seven-game losing streak, their longest since joining the B.League.

The team faced difficulties in securing a replacement for Jones, and after a short stint with Jahmar Thorpe, they finally succeeded in bringing in Marqus Blakely. However, the team's performance failed to improve. Further setbacks followed as the season was interrupted by the outbreak of COVID-19, eliminating opportunities for a late-season turnaround.

Although the season eventually resumed behind closed doors as the pandemic temporarily subsided, the Volters were unable to regain momentum and continued to struggle. With the resurgence of infections nationwide, the season was ultimately canceled. The Volters finished with a record of 20–27, placing 4th in the B2 West Conference. The postseason was not held, and promotion rights were awarded to the top two teams in the regular season standings—meaning the Volters once again fell short of promotion.

==== 2020-2021 season ====
The B2 division was restructured into a two-conference format consisting of 16 teams, divided into East and West. The Volters were assigned to the West Conference.

In September 2020, due to health reasons, Satosi Yunoue—the founder of the Volters—stepped down as president of Kumamoto Basketball Co., Ltd. His successor was Taturou Nisii, who had served as the team’s general manager since its inception and now assumed a dual role as president. Head coach Nenad Vučinić remained in charge, and the team brought in Marvelle Harris, Evan Ravenel, and David Doblas for the season. However, due to complications caused by the COVID-19 pandemic, Vučinić, Harris, and Ravenel were unable to enter Japan in time for the season.

As a result, assistant coach Osamu Okada was urgently appointed as acting head coach, with Jun Hasizume stepping into the assistant coach role. To temporarily fill the foreign player slots, the team signed Daniel Orton and Chris Olivier on short-term contracts. Vučinić did not rejoin the team on-site but instead served as an advisory coach, providing guidance and strategy remotely.

Shortly before the season opener, a COVID-19 case was detected within the team, forcing a temporary suspension of all team activities and resulting in limited preparation ahead of the season. The team started off strong through Round 4, but frequent injuries soon disrupted momentum. The departure of Harris mid-season further impacted performance, although the gap was later filled by Shaheed Davis. Nevertheless, injuries continued to plague the team, with multiple players placed on the injured list.

In March 2021, head coach Okada also stepped away due to health issues, with assistant coach Hasizume taking over head coaching duties. However, the team’s struggles persisted, culminating in an 11-game losing streak. The Volters finished the season 26–34, placing 6th in the B2 West Conference and failing to qualify for the postseason. Despite the challenges, the Volters—along with the Yamagata Wyverns of the B2 East—were one of only two teams across both B1 and B2 to complete all 60 scheduled games. During the same season, Japanese player Ryusei Sasaki of the Volters achieved the prestigious 50-40-90 milestone, marking an exceptional level of shooting efficiency.

==== 2021-2022 season ====
The B2 division was restructured into a two-conference format featuring 14 teams. The Volters were assigned to the West Conference.

After stepping down as general manager to focus solely on his role as president, Taturou Nisii was not replaced in the GM position. Instead, team manager Ryusei Tokunaga and newly appointed head coach Don Beck jointly assumed the general manager duties. The team entered the season with new foreign players Jordan Hamilton, L.J. Peak, and Ben Lawson.

The Volters started the season strong with three consecutive wins, but soon suffered a setback as Hamilton sustained an injury and was placed on the injured list. Kyle Barone was brought in as a temporary replacement, but shortly thereafter, Lawson also suffered an injury and was forced to miss time, placing the team in a difficult position and halting their early momentum.

However, the team rebounded in the latter half of the season, stringing together a series of victories. The Volters concluded the season with a 36–18 record (six games were canceled due to COVID-19), finishing 2nd in the B2 West Conference and 4th overall, securing a place in the postseason.

In the playoff quarterfinals, the Volters mounted a dramatic comeback in Game 1, overturning a 17-point deficit to claim victory. They followed up with a hard-fought win in Game 2 after double overtime, advancing to the semifinals. However, the team entered the semifinals without Jordan Hamilton—who had re-injured himself after returning from the injured list—and was further hampered by a string of injuries among Japanese players, leaving the squad in a depleted state.

Facing the top-seeded team in the league, the Volters suffered back-to-back losses and fell short of promotion. To make matters worse, a COVID-19 case was detected within the team just before the third-place game, forcing the Volters to forfeit. As a result, they officially finished the season in 4th place overall.

In February 2022, the club was cited by the league for the improper use of the injured list during the 2020–21 season, as well as for a case of power harassment involving a player. In response, the club established an independent third-party committee in March to conduct a full investigation. The findings confirmed the occurrence of both violations.

In April, the league issued disciplinary actions against the club and then-president/general manager Tatsrou Nisii. As a result, Nisii resigned from his position as president to take responsibility, and chairman Eiitirou Suminaga also stepped down at the conclusion of the season.

In an effort to prevent recurrence and stabilize team operations, the club announced mid-season that Donald Beck would continue as head coach while also assuming the role of general manager. Assistant coach Kouto Tooyama was promoted to associate head coach and assistant general manager, and Ryusei Tokunaga remained in his role as assistant general manager.

==== 2022-2023 season ====
The B2 division maintained its two-conference structure with 14 teams, and the Volters continued to compete in the West Conference.

In June 2022, the club underwent a leadership restructuring, with Takuya Fukuda appointed as the new president. The personnel decisions made at the end of the previous season were temporary measures, and to prevent an overconcentration of authority, Don Beck stepped down from his roles as head coach and general manager in August 2022. However, he remained with the organization as a coaching development advisor. Ryusei Tokunaga was appointed general manager, while Kouto Tooyama assumed the role of head coach.

Ben Lawson re-signed with the team, joined by Terrance Woodbury—returning for a second stint with the Volters since the 2017–18 season—and Jamel McLean. The season began with a series of injuries, including McLean being placed on the injured list early on. Kevin Kotzur was brought in as a temporary replacement until McLean’s return, but the team struggled to improve its win percentage during that stretch.

Although the Volters recorded a five-game winning streak in the latter half of the season, they were unable to build sustained momentum, as key scorer Woodbury suffered a long-term injury. The team finished the regular season with a 35–25 record, placing 3rd in the B2 West Conference and 5th overall, securing a spot in the postseason.

In the playoff quarterfinals, the Volters lost Game 1 after surrendering a lead of up to 17 points. In Game 2, they were outpaced in the fourth quarter and suffered a second consecutive defeat, once again falling short of promotion.

In March 2023, in an effort to address its financial difficulties and eliminate its capital deficit, Kumamoto Basketball Co., Ltd. came under the umbrella of the Nisikawa Group, a corporate group based in Kumamoto City. The Nisikawa Group expressed its support by stating, “Kumamoto needs the Volters as a professional club rooted in the local community.”

==== 2023-2024 season ====
The B2 division maintained its two-conference structure with 14 teams, and the Volters continued to compete in the West Conference.

Head coach Kouto Tooyama remained at the helm, with Jamel McLean and Terrance Woodbury re-signing with the team. The Volters also added Aaron White to strengthen the roster for the upcoming season.

As part of the preseason, the club hosted its first-ever international friendly match against an overseas team, the TaiwanBeer Leopards of Taiwan’s T1 League.

The team got off to a strong start, recording five- and seven-game winning streaks in the first half of the season. In the latter half, the Volters posted nine consecutive victories, briefly rising to the top of the B2 West standings. However, a series of injuries later in the season reduced the active roster to as few as seven players at one point, leading to a sharp decline in performance—including an eight-game losing streak.

Despite these challenges, the Volters finished the regular season with a 33–27 record, placing 3rd in the B2 West Conference and 5th overall, thereby securing a spot in the postseason.

In the playoff quarterfinals, the Volters suffered decisive defeats in both games, conceding over 100 points in each contest. As a result, they were eliminated from the postseason and once again missed out on promotion.

In March 2024, Takuya Fukuda stepped down as president and Satosi Yunoue was reappointed to the position.

==== 2024-2025 season ====
The B2 division maintained its two-conference structure with 14 teams, and the Volters continued to compete in the West Conference.

With the B.League set to transition to a new structure beginning in the 2026–27 season, the 2025–26 season marked the final opportunity for teams to earn promotion based on competitive results. In pursuit of this last chance, the Volters appointed Jeff Hironaka as head coach and named former head coach Kouto Tooyama as assistant coach. Jamel McLean returned to the roster, joined by new signings Kihei Clark, Mitch Lightfoot, and Tyler Lamb.

As a continuation from last season, the club hosted a preseason international friendly match with the TaiwanBeer Leopards of Taiwan’s T1 League.

The season began in disappointing fashion, as the Volters dropped their first six games. Although they secured a win to move out of last place in the West, the team soon fell into a prolonged slump with a nine-game losing streak.

A lack of size in the roster led to an increasing number of injuries. Lamb was sidelined for an extended period, and Clark was placed on the injured list. In response, the team signed Gregory Echenique to bolster its interior presence and released Clark. The changes helped the team snap its losing streak.

In December, Hironaka stepped down due to poor performance, and Tooyama was promoted to head coach. Under Tooyama’s leadership, the team began to stabilize, but was unable to build consistent momentum, with their longest winning streak capped at five games.

The Volters concluded the regular season with a 27–33 record, finishing 4th in the B2 West Conference. On the final day of the regular season, they secured 8th place overall, narrowly claiming the final wildcard spot to advance to the postseason.

The team lost back-to-back games in the quarterfinals of the playoffs, and the goal of promotion to B1 since the start of the B.League remained unfulfilled.

==== 2025-2026 season ====
The B2 division maintained its two-conference structure with 14 teams, and the Volters continued to compete in the West Conference.

In what would be the final season under the current system, one where the hope of promotion had been lost, the club retained Kouto Tooyama as head coach and continued player contracts with Mitch Lightfoot and Gregory Echenique, while also bringing in Nemanja Đurišić and naturalized Senegalese player Lamine Mbodj for the season.

In this season’s preseason, the club organized international friendly matches, including its first-ever matches held overseas against the Changwon LG Sakers of Korea’s KBL and the TaiwanBeer Leopards of Taiwan’s T1 League, while the game against the New Zealand Breakers of Australia’s NBL was held in Japan.

| Season | Head Coach | W | L | W% | GB | pts | pts allowed | pt diffential | conf. ranking | overall ranking | total attendance | average attendance | note |
|---|---|---|---|---|---|---|---|---|---|---|---|---|---|
| B2 2016-17 | Takayuki Yasuda | 44 | 16 | .733 | 7(2) | 4,623 | 4,231 | 392 | 3/6 | 3/18 | 63,295 | 2,109 | |
| B2 2017-18 | Takayuki Yasuda | 41 | 19 | .683 | 13(-) | 4,863 | 4,487 | 376 | 2/6 | 3/18 | 64,712 | 2,157 | |
| B2 2018-19 | Takayuki Yasuda | 45 | 15 | .750 | 3(-) | 5,237 | 4,767 | 470 | 1/6 | 4/18 | 77,076 | 2,569 | |
| B2 2019-20 | Nenad Vučinić | 20 | 27 | .426 | 20(5) | 3,678 | 3,931 | -253 | 4/6 | 12/18 | 44,616 | 1,859 | canceled 13 games |
| B2 2020-21 | Osamu Okada→Jun Hasizume | 26 | 34 | .433 | 15(5) | 5,018 | 5,207 | -189 | 6/8 | 12/16 | 29,624 | 987 | Held at 50% capacity |
| B2 2021-22 | Don Beck | 36 | 18 | .667 | 1(-) | 4,898 | 4,167 | 731 | 2/7 | 4/14 | 29,205 | 1,168 | Held at 50% capacity, and canceled 6 games |
| B2 2022-23 | Kouto Tooyama | 35 | 25 | .583 | 10(-) | 4,685 | 4,691 | -6 | 3/7 | 5/14 | 51,296 | 1,710 | |
| B2 2023-24 | Kouto Tooyama | 33 | 27 | .550 | 11(-) | 5,110 | 5,119 | -9 | 3/7 | 5/14 | 80,727 | 2,691 | |
| B2 2024-25 | Jeff Hironaka→Kouto Tooyama | 27 | 33 | .450 | 15(-) | 4,756 | 4,793 | -37 | 4/7 | 8/14 | 101,758 | 3,392 | |

== Roster ==
Kumamoto Volters roster
Players
Coaches

| Pos. | No. | Nat. | Name |
|---|---|---|---|
| SF | 1 | (United States) | Rawle Alkins (+) |
| PG | 2 | (Japan) | Chikara Tanaka |
| SG | 3 | (Japan) | Shouta Yamamoto (injured) |
| G/F | 5 | (Japan) | Hiroaki Isono (C) |
| F | 10 | (Japan) | Takeshi Kunza (+) |
| PG | 11 | (Japan) | Kaito Ishikawa |
| PG | 12 | (Japan) | Kouki Hosaka |
| PG | 13 | (Japan) | Ren Nagashima |
| C | 15 | (Japan) | Lamine Mbodj |
| SG | 16 | (Japan) | Kouyou Nishida (injured) (+) |
| SG | 17 | (Japan) | Keita Sawabe |
| SG | 31 | (Japan) | Atomu Yamada |
| SF | 32 | (Japan) | Ren Kanetika (+) |
| F/C | 88 | (Venezuela) | Gregory Echenique |

Head coach

Kouto Tooyama

Assistant coach(es)

You Tenyoku

Legend

- (C) Team captain
- Injured

- Roster
Updated: 30 Mar, 2026

== Notable players ==
- Lamont Jones (2013–14)
- DeVaughn Washington (2013–14,2015–16)
- Thomas Baudinet (2014)
- Garlon Green (2014–15)
- Cyril Awere (2014–15)
- Joshu Warren (2014–15)
- Joshua Crawford (2015–16)
- Tshilidzi Nephawe (2015–16, 2018–19)
- Paul Butorac (2016–17)
- Reggie Warren (2016–17)
- Joel James (2016–18)
- Josh Duinker (2017–19)
- Terrance Woodbury (2017–18, 2022–24 )
- Jordan Vandenberg (2017–18)
- Chehales Tapscott (2018–19)
- Scott Morrisone (2018–19)
- Bobby Jones (2019)
- Gavin Ware (2019–20)
- David Weaver (2019–20)
- Jahmar Thorpe (2019)
- Marqus Blakely (2020)
- Daniel Orton (2020)
- Chris Olivier (2020)
- Marvelle Harris (2020–21)
- Evan Ravenel (2020–21)
- David Doblas (2020–21)
- Shaheed Davis (2021)
- Jordan Hamilton (2021–22)
- L.J. Peak (2021–22)
- Ben Lawson (2021–23)
- Kyle Barone (2021)
- Kevin Kotzur (2022–23)
- Jamel McLean (2022–25)
- Aaron White (2023–24)
- Kihei Clark (2024–25)
- Tyler Lamb (2024–25)
- Mitch Lightfoot (2024–26)
- Nemanja Đurišić (2025–26)

== Coaches ==
- Norm deSilva (2013–14)
- Sinji Tomiyama (2014)
- Yosinori Simizu (2014–16)
- Takayuki Yasuda (2016–19)
- Nenad Vučinić (2019–20)
- Osamu Okada (es) (2020–21)
- Donald Beck (2021–22)
- Kouto Tooyama (2022–24, 2024.Dec - )
- Jeff Hironaka (2024.Jun - Dec)

== Arenas ==
- Kumamoto Prefectural Gymnasium: It has been used as the main arena since the 2016-17 season.
- Masiki Town General Gymnasium: It was the club’s main arena at the time of its founding. It was damaged in the 2016 Kumamoto Earthquakes and underwent restoration work. It has been back in use since the 2022–23 season.
- Kikuyou Town General Gymnasium: It has been in use since the 2023–24 season.
- Yatusiro "Toyooka-tiken" Arena: It has not been used by the team since the 2022–23 season.
- "ecowin" Uto Arena: It has not been used by the team since the 2022–23 season.
- Kousi City General Center "Vivre": It has not been used by the team since the 2020–21 season.
- "Nursepower" Arena(Kumamoto City General Gymnasium): It has not been used by the team since the 2019–20 season.
- Kikuti City General Gymnasium: It has not been used by the team since the 2019–20 season.
- Tamana City General Gymnasium: It has not been used by the team since the 2019–20 season.
- Minamata City General Gymnasium: It has not been used by the team since the 2019–20 season.
- Hitoyosi Sports Palace: It has not been used by the team since the 2017–18 season.
