= Julian Mavunga =

Zimbabwean-American basketball player

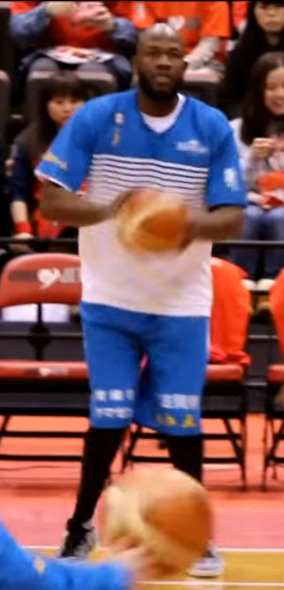

Free agent
- Position: Power forward

Personal information
- Born: January 24, 1990 (age 36) Harare, Zimbabwe
- Listed height: 6 ft 8 in (2.03 m)
- Listed weight: 235 lb (107 kg)

Career information
- High school: Brownsburg (Brownsburg, Indiana)
- College: Miami (Ohio) (2008–2012)
- NBA draft: 2012: undrafted
- Playing career: 2012–present

Career history
- 2012: Pallacanestro Biella
- 2013–2014: Hoverla
- 2014–2015: Ironi Nahariya
- 2015: Sigal Prishtina
- 2015–2017: Shiga Lakestars
- 2017–2020: Kyoto Hannaryz
- 2020–2022: Toyama Grouses
- 2022: Utsunomiya Brex

Career highlights
- B.League Best Five (2021); Balkan League champions (2015); All-bj League Second Team (2016); B.league assist leader (2018-19); First-team All-MAC (2011, 2012)

Julian Tawanda Mavunga (born January 24, 1990) is a Zimbabwean-American professional basketball player. He is the older brother of WNBA player Stephanie Mavunga of the Indiana Fever. He played four seasons of college basketball for Miami University, where he broke Miami's career games record at 124 appearances. He was intentionally elbowed by Shiga forward Henry Walker on March 3, 2019. His younger brother Jordache Mavunga plays for the Bambitious Nara of the B.League.

== Career statistics ==
Legend
GP	Games played	GS	Games started	MPG	Minutes per game
FG%	Field goal percentage	3P%	3-point field goal percentage	FT%	Free throw percentage
RPG	Rebounds per game	APG	Assists per game	SPG	Steals per game
BPG	Blocks per game	PPG	Points per game	**Bold**	Career high

Year	Team	GP	GS	MPG	FG%	3P%	FT%	RPG	APG	SPG	BPG	PPG
2015-16	Shiga	51	49	31.0	.515	.377	.738	9.6	3.5	0.7	0.8	19.5
2016-17	Shiga	60	49	31.9	.447	.357	.717	8.1	3.5	0.8	0.7	19.5
2017-18	Kyoto	47	11	15.6	.447	.358	.738	4.8	4.1	0.8	0.4	15.6
2018-19	Kyoto	53	53	38.3	.430	.321	.753	8.7	8.5	1.0	.7	21.6

== Personal life ==
In July 2016, Mavunga married former Indiana Fever player Jeanette Pohlen-Mavunga.
