= Saga Ballooners =

- Conference: West
- Division: B1 League (promoted)
- Leagues: B.League
- Founded: 2018; 8 years ago
- Arena: Saga Arena
- Capacity: 8,400
- Location: Saga, Saga
- Head coach: Yuta Miyanaga
- Website: ballooners.jp
| Home | Away |

The Saga Ballooners (佐賀バルーナーズ, Saga Barūnāzu) are a Japanese professional basketball team based in Saga. The team competes in the B.League Premier, the highest division of the B.League, as a member of the Western Conference. The team's name is a reference to the Saga International Balloon Fiesta. The team plays its home games at Saga Arena.

== Coaches ==
- Aljosa Bjekovic (2018–2019)
- Luis Guil Torres (2019–2021)
- Yuta Miyanaga (2021–present)

== Roster ==
As of 2026-2027.

Saga Ballooners roster
Players
Coaches

| Pos. | No. | Nat. | Name | Ht. | Age |
|---|---|---|---|---|---|
| G/F | 1 | (United States) | Damyean Dotson | 1.96 m (6 ft 5 in) | 32 – 6 May 1994 |
| F | 7 | (Japan) | Kosuke Hashimoto | 2.02 m (6 ft 8 in) | 33 – 6 May 1993 |
| F/C | 8 | (Indonesia) | Derrick Michael Xzavierro | 2.08 m (6 ft 10 in) | 23 – 1 April 2003 |
| F | 9 | (United States) | Nassir Little | 1.98 m (6 ft 6 in) | 26 – 11 February 2000 |
| G | 11 | (Japan) | Futa Takedomi | 1.76 m (5 ft 9 in) | 22 – 5 November 2003 |
| G | 13 | (Japan) | Ryo Abe | 1.84 m (6 ft 0 in) | 30 – 4 November 1995 |
| G/F | 14 | (Japan) | Kosuke Kanamaru | 1.92 m (6 ft 4 in) | 37 – 8 March 1989 |
| G | 18 | (Japan) | Sori Uchio | 1.84 m (6 ft 0 in) | 25 – 12 April 2001 |
| G | 20 | (Japan) | Atsuki Kishida | 1.75 m (5 ft 9 in) | 30 – 28 October 1995 |
| F | 21 | (Japan) | Toshiki Tomiyama | 1.94 m (6 ft 4 in) | 23 – 18 March 2003 |
| F | 23 | (United States) | Dave Dudzinski | 2.06 m (6 ft 9 in) | 34 – 26 May 1992 |
| G | 25 | (Japan) | Taiki Sumida | 1.82 m (6 ft 0 in) | 27 – 28 September 1999 |
| F | 34 | (Japan) | Ryota Inoue | 1.85 m (6 ft 1 in) | 31 – 19 April 1995 |

Head coach

Yuta Miyanaga

Assistant coach(es)

Tatsuya Takahashi
Satoshi Ishitani

Legend

- (C) Team captain
- Injured

- Roster

Note: Flags indicate national team eligibility at FIBA-sanctioned events. Players may hold other non-FIBA nationalities not displayed.

== Notable players ==
- Aljosa Bjekovic
- Trey Gilder
- Gary Hamilton
- Kenny Lawson Jr.
- Marcos Mata
- Nick Washburn
- Rintaro Tokunaga
- Alan Wiggins

== Arenas ==
- Saga Sunrise Park General Gymnasium
- Karatsu City Cultural Gymnasium
- Morodomi Cultural Gymnasium
