= 2017–18 B.League season =

Sports season

- League: B.League
- Season: 2017–18
- Duration: September 29, 2017 – May 8, 2018

B1 Regular season
- Season MVP: Makoto Hiejima
- Promoted: (B1) Akita Northern Happinets, Rizing Zephyr Fukuoka (B2) Tokyo Hachioji Trains
- Relegated: (B2) Nishinomiya Storks, Shimane Susanoo Magic (B3) Iwate Big Bulls

B1 Finals
- Champions: Alvark Tokyo
- Runners-up: Chiba Jets
- Finals MVP: Daiki Tanaka

Statistical leaders
- Points: Davante Gardner
- Rebounds: Nick Fazekas
- Assists: Naoki Uto

Records
- Highest attendance: 6,299
- Lowest attendance: 956

The 2017–18 B.League season was the second season of the Japanese B.League.

== B1 Regular season ==
#	B1	W	L	PCT	GB	GP
1	SeaHorses Mikawa	48	12	.800	—	60
2	Chiba Jets Funabashi	46	14	.767	2	60
3	Alvark Tokyo	44	16	.733	4	60
4	Ryukyu Golden Kings	42	18	.700	6	60
5	Kawasaki Brave Thunders	41	19	.683	7	60
6	Tochigi Brex	34	26	.567	14	60
7	Kyoto Hannaryz	34	26	.567	14	60
8	Nagoya Diamond Dolphins	31	29	.517	17	60
9	Sun Rockers Shibuya	28	32	.467	20	60
10	Niigata Albirex BB	28	32	.467	20	60
11	Levanga Hokkaido	26	34	.433	22	60
12	San-en NeoPhoenix	25	35	.417	23	60
13	Osaka Evessa	24	36	.400	24	60
14	Shiga Lakestars	24	36	.400	24	60
15	Toyama Grouses	24	36	.400	24	60
16	Yokohama B-Corsairs	18	42	.300	30	60
17	Nishinomiya Storks	12	48	.200	36	60
18	Shimane Susanoo Magic	11	49	.183	37	60

== B1 Playoffs ==
Quarter-finals
1 SeaHorses Mikawa	77	80
6 Tochigi Brex	63	75
3 Alvark Tokyo	82	78
7 Kyoto Hannaryz	75	69
4 Ryukyu Golden Kings	69	66	17
8 Nagoya Diamond Dolphins	71	62	12
2 Chiba Jets	87	61	22
5 Kawasaki Brave Thunders	65	71	15

Semi-finals
1 SeaHorses Mikawa	65	71
3 Alvark Tokyo	69	73
4 Ryukyu Golden Kings	61	64
2 Chiba Jets	74	72

Final
3 Alvark Tokyo	85
2 Chiba Jets	60

=== B1 Final ===
NHK BS-1, Sponavi Live, DAZN, TV Tokyo

May 26
2:05 pm

Report

Alvark Tokyo 85, Chiba Jets 60
Scoring by quarter: 19-18, 24-15, 18-16, 24-11

Yokohama Arena, Yokohama
Attendance: 12,005

== B1 Relegation playoffs ==
Semi-finals
15 Toyama Grouses	70	93	18
18 Shimane Susanoo Magic	90	73	13
16 Yokohama B-Corsairs	83	102	20
17 Nishinomiya Storks	86	81	18

Final
15 Toyama Grouses	76
16 Yokohama B-Corsairs	79

B1B2 P/R final
15	Toyama Grouses	88
B2-4	Kumamoto Volters	85

== B1 Individual statistic leaders ==
Category	Player	Team	Statistic
Points per game	Davante Gardner	Niigata Albirex BB	28.7
Rebounds per game	Nick Fazekas	Kawasaki Brave Thunders	10.9
Assists per game	Naoki Uto	Toyama Grouses	7.7
Steals per game	Michael Parker	Chiba Jets Funabashi	1.9
Blocks per game	Hasheem Thabeet	Yokohama B-Corsairs	2.3
Turnovers per game	Naoki Uto	Toyama Grouses	3.2
Fouls per game	D'or Fischer	Shiga Lakestars	3.4
Minutes per game	Naoki Uto	Toyama Grouses	34.5
FT%	Kosuke Kanamaru	SeaHorses Mikawa	93.2%
3FG%	Shuhei Kitagawa	Link Tochigi Brex	41.7%

== B2 Regular season ==
2017–18 B.League season

B2 Regular season
- Season MVP: Shigehiro Taguchi

B2 Finals
- Champions: Rizing Zephyr Fukuoka
- Runners-up: Akita Northern Happinets
- Finals MVP: Josh Peppers

Statistical leaders
- Points: Chehales Tapscott
- Rebounds: Reginald Warren
- Assists: Takumi Furuno

Records
- Highest attendance: 4,721
- Lowest attendance: 277

#	B2	W	L	PCT	GB	GP
1	Akita Northern Happinets	54	6	.900	—	60
2	Rizing Zephyr Fukuoka	47	13	.783	7	60
3	Kumamoto Volters	41	19	.683	13	60
4	Toyotsu Fighting Eagles Nagoya	39	21	.650	15	60
5	Cyberdyne Ibaraki Robots	38	22	.633	16	60
6	Fukushima Firebonds	38	22	.633	16	60
7	Hiroshima Dragonflies	33	27	.550	21	60
8	Ehime Orange Vikings	33	27	.550	21	60
9	Gunma Crane Thunders	32	28	.533	22	60
10	Kanazawa Samuraiz	28	32	.467	26	60
11	Shinshu Brave Warriors	25	35	.417	29	60
12	Passlab Yamagata Wyverns	25	35	.417	29	60
13	Kagawa Five Arrows	22	38	.367	32	60
14	Sendai 89ers	21	39	.350	33	60
15	Earthfriends Tokyo Z	20	40	.333	34	60
16	Bambitious Nara	19	41	.317	35	60
17	Aomori Wat's	18	42	.300	36	60
18	Iwate Big Bulls	7	53	.117	47	60

== B2 Playoffs ==
Semi-finals
1 Akita Northern Happinets	85	99
4 Kumamoto Volters	81	65
2 Rizing Zephyr Fukuoka	103	94
3 Toyotsu Fighting Eagles Nagoya	95	72

Final
1 Akita Northern Happinets	83	73	12
2 Rizing Zephyr Fukuoka	69	82	15

Third place
4 Kumamoto Volters	79	85
3 Toyotsu Fighting Eagles Nagoya	77	78

B2B3 P/R final
18	Iwate Big Bulls	55
B3-1	Tokyo Hachioji Trains	83

== B2 Individual statistic leaders ==
Category	Player	Team	Statistic
Points per game	Chehales Tapscott	Kagawa Five Arrows	22.1
Rebounds per game	Reginald Warren	Kagawa Five Arrows	12.7
Assists per game	Takumi Furuno	Kumamoto Volters	7.1
Steals per game	Takuya Nakayama	Akita Northern Happinets	2.1
Blocks per game	Kadeem Coleby	Akita Northern Happinets	1.7
Turnovers per game	Tshilidzi Nephawe	Bambitious Nara	3.0
Fouls per game	Nyika Williams	Ehime Orange Vikings	3.3
Minutes per game	Tatsuhiko Toshino	Ehime Orange Vikings	33.1
FT%	Shigehiro Taguchi	Akita Northern Happinets	88.7%
3FG%	Kohei Fukuzawa	Toyotsu Fighting Eagles Nagoya	44.5%

== B3 season ==
2017–18 B.League season

B3 Regular season
- Season MVP: Hiroya Ogane

B3 Finals
- Champions: Tokyo Hachioji Trains

Statistical leaders
- Points: Patrick Simon
- Rebounds: Patrick Simon
- Assists: Eiji Sumihiro

=== B3 First stage ===
#	B3 First Stage	W	L	PCT	GB	GP
1	Tokyo Hachioji Trains	8	2	.800	—	10
2	Tokyo Excellence	7	3	.700	1	10
3	Kagoshima Rebnise	5	5	.500	3	10
4	Saitama Broncos	5	5	.400	3	10
5	Otsuka Corporation Alphas	4	6	.400	4	10
6	Tokyo Cinq Reves	1	9	.100	7	10

=== B3 Regular season ===
#	B3 Regular season	W	L	PCT	GB	GP
1	Tokyo Hachioji Trains	26	6	.813	—	32
2	Otsuka Corporation Alphas	23	9	.719	3	32
3	Tokyo Excellence	21	11	.656	5	32
4	Saitama Broncos	20	12	.625	6	32
5	Toyoda Gosei Scorpions	19	13	.594	7	32
6	Kagoshima Rebnise	14	18	.438	12	32
7	Aisin AW Areions Anjo	11	21	.344	15	32
8	Tokyo Cinq Reves	5	27	.156	21	32
9	Tokio Marine Nichido Big Blue	5	27	.156	21	32

=== B3 Final stage ===
#	B3 Final Stage	W	L	PCT	GB	GP
1	Tokyo Hachioji Trains	17	3	.850	—	20
2	Otsuka Corporation Alphas	13	7	.650	4	20
3	Tokyo Excellence	12	8	.600	5	20
4	Kagoshima Rebnise	8	12	.400	9	20
5	Saitama Broncos	8	12	.400	9	20
6	Tokyo Cinq Reves	2	18	.100	15	20

== B3 Individual statistic leaders ==
Category	Player	Team	Statistic
Points per game	Patrick Simon	Toyoda Gosei Scorpions	21.323
Rebounds per game	Patrick Simon	Toyoda Gosei Scorpions	10.806
Assists per game	Eiji Sumihiro	Toyoda Gosei Scorpions	5.5
Steals per game	Andre Murray	Tokyo Cinq Reves	2.167
Blocks per game	Justin Herold	Tokyo Excellence	1.188
FT%	Ryuichiro Nakazono	Kagoshima Rebnise	94.7%
3FG%	Kenta Tateyama	Kagoshima Rebnise	42.1%
