= Hirokazu Nema =

Japanese basketball player and coach

Shiga Lakestars
- Position: U15 coach
- League: B.League

Personal information
- Born: May 12, 1979 (age 47) Tomigusuku, Okinawa
- Listed height: 186 cm (6 ft 1 in)
- Listed weight: 83 kg (183 lb)

Career information
- High school: Chatan (Chatan, Okinawa)
- College: Hosei University
- Playing career: 2002–2008
- Coaching career: 2008–present

Career history

Playing
- 2002-2005: Yokohama Giga Cats
- 2005-2006: Fukuoka Red Falcons
- 2006-2008: Toyama Grouses

Coaching
- 2008-2010: Toyama Grouses (asst)
- 2008: Toyama Grouses (interim)
- 2010-2011: Shiga Lakestars (asst)
- 2011: Shiga Lakestars
- 2011-2013: Shiga Lakestras (asst)
- 2014-2015: Gunma Crane Thunders (asst)
- 2015-2016: Gunma Crane Thunders
- 2016-2017: Hiroshima Dragonflies (asst)
- 2017-2019: Shiga Lakestars (asst)

Hirokazu Nema (根間洋一, Nema Hirokazu) is a Japanese basketball coach and former player. He is currently the U15 coach of the Shiga Lakestars in the Japanese B.League.

== Early life ==
Nema was born in Okinawa, Japan, in 1979. He attended Chatan Senior High School and later Hosei University.

== Playing career ==
Nema played professionally for six seasons in the JBL Super League and the bj league from 2002 to 2006.

== Coaching career ==
After his playing career came to an end, Nema got into coaching in 2008. He served as an interim coach for the Toyama Grouses after head coach Masato Fukushima was fired on 28 November 2008 and until the hiring of former Japan national team center Takatoshi Ishibashi on 9 December 2008. In 2015, he was hired as the head coach of the Gunma Crane Thunders.

== Head coaching record ==
Legend
Regular season	G	Games coached	W	Games won	L	Games lost	W–L %	Win–loss %
Playoffs	PG	Playoff games	PW	Playoff wins	PL	Playoff losses	PW–L %	Playoff win–loss %

Team	Year	G	W	L	W–L%	Finish	PG	PW	PL	PW–L%	Result
Shiga Lakestars	2011	16	11	5	.688	4th in Western	5	2	3	.400	Lost in 2nd round
Gunma Crane Thunders	2015-16	52	22	30	.423	9th in Eastern	-	-	-	–	-
