= Herold (surname) =

Herold is a surname. Notable people with the surname include:

- August Herold (1902–1973), German grape breeder
- Carl Herold (1848–1931), German politician
- Charles Hérold Jr. (born 1990), Haitian footballer
- Constantin Herold (1912–1984), Romanian multi-sport athlete
- David Herold (1842–1865), American conspirator in the Lincoln assassination
- Deborah Herold (born 1995), Indian cyclist
- Diana Herold (born 1974), German photomodel
- Don Herold (1889–1966), American humorist
- Else Herold (1906–1999), German pianist
- Emanuel Herold (born 1986), German politician
- Felicia Herold (1915–2003), English actress
- Ferdinand Hérold (1791–1833), French composer
- Georg Herold (born 1947), German artist
- Gérard Hérold (1939–1993), French actor
- Horst Herold (1923–2018), German police officer
- J. Christopher Herold (1919–1964), Czech-American editor and author
- Jacques Hérold (1910–1987), Romanian painter
- Jens-Peter Herold (born 1965), German middle-distance runner
- Johann Gregor Herold (1696–1775), German painter
- Justin Herold (born 1991), American basketball player
- Kim Herold (born 1979), Finnish model and singer-songwriter
- Maxime Hérold (born 1989), French rugby league footballer
- Robert Herold (1910–1969), French gymnast
- Rudolph A. Herold (1870–1926), American architect
- Sabine Herold (born 1981), French libertarian
- Ted Herold (1942–2021), German Schlager singer
- Vilhelm Herold (1865–1937), Danish operatic tenor
- Volker Herold (born 1959), German actor
- Walter Herold (1897–1944), German Wehrmacht officer
- Willi Herold (1925–1946), German war criminal
- Wolfgang Herold (born 1961), German film producer
