= Collier St. Clair =

American basketball coach

Collier St. Clair コリアー・セントクレア
Personal information
- Born: November 9, 1979 (age 47) Atlanta, Georgia

Career information
- College: Hampton University
- Position: Head coach
- Coaching career: 2002–present

Career history

Coaching
- 2002-2005: Westlake HS
- 2005-2009: Southern Polytechnic State University (associate)
- 2009-2010: Clark Atlanta University (associate)
- 2011-2013: Al Sharjah (associate)
- 2013-2015: Al Jazira
- 2015-2016: Al Nasr (associate)
- 2016-: Saitama Broncos

Collier St. Clair (born November 9, 1979) is an American basketball head coach for the Saitama Broncos of the Japanese B.League.

== Head coaching record ==
Legend
| Regular season | G | Games coached | W | Games won | L | Games lost | W–L % | Win–loss % |
| Playoffs | PG | Playoff games | PW | Playoff wins | PL | Playoff losses | PW–L % | Playoff win–loss % |

| Team | Year | G | W | L | W–L% | Finish | PG | PW | PL | PW–L% | Result |
|---|---|---|---|---|---|---|---|---|---|---|---|
| Saitama Broncos | 2016-17 | 42 | 13 | 29 | .310 | 7th in B3 | 10 | 3 | 7 | .300 | 5th in Final stage |
| Saitama Broncos | 2017-18 | 42 | 25 | 17 | .595 | 4th in B3 | 20 | 8 | 12 | .400 | 5th in Final stage |
