= Shimoji =

Shimoji may refer to:

- Shimoji (surname), a Ryukyuan surname
- Shimoji-shima, an island of Okinawa Prefecture, Japan
- Shimoji, Okinawa, a former town in Miyako District, Okinawa Prefecture, Japan
- Shimoji Station, a railway station in Toyohashi, Aichi Prefecture, Japan
