= Sugasawa =

Sugasawa (written: 菅澤) is a Japanese surname. Notable people with the surname include:

- Noriyuki Sugasawa (菅澤 紀行, born 1987), Japanese basketball player
- Yuika Sugasawa (菅澤 優衣香, born 1990), Japanese women's footballer
