= Narito Namizato =

Japanese basketball player

Narito Namizato 並里成
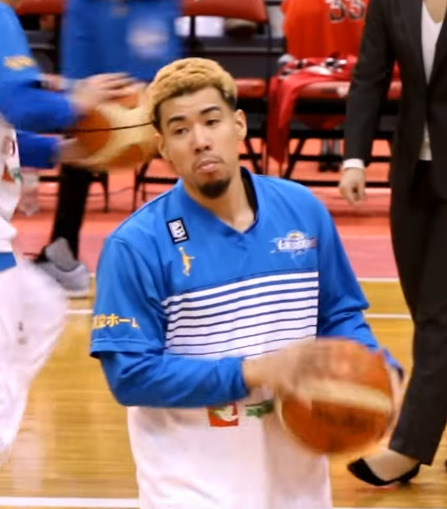
- Namizato in 2017

No. 3 – Fighting Eagles Nagoya
- Position: Point guard
- League: B.League

Personal information
- Born: August 7, 1989 (age 37) Okinawa, Okinawa
- Listed height: 5 ft 8 in (1.73 m)
- Listed weight: 159 lb (72 kg)

Career information
- High school: Fukuoka Daiichi (Fukuoka, Fukuoka); South Kent School (South Kent, Connecticut)
- NBA draft: 2011: undrafted

Career history
- 2009–2011: Link Tochigi Brex
- 2011–2015: Ryukyu Golden Kings
- 2015–2016: Osaka Evessa
- 2016–2018: Shiga Lakestars
- 2018–2022: Ryukyu Golden Kings
- 2022–2025: Gunma Crane Thunders
- 2025–present: Fighting Eagles Nagoya

Career highlights
- 2× B.League champion

Narito Namizato (born August 7, 1989) is a Japanese professional basketball player for Fighting Eagles Nagoya of the B.League. In 2008 Namizato won the "Slam Dunk Scholarship" funded by Takehiko Inoue, and played in America. He is one of the league-leading premier passers.

== Basketball shoes ==
He prefers sturdy materials and hard rubber for basketball shoes (Asics).

== Personal ==
His brother Tasuku played for the Kumamoto Volters of the B.League.

== Career statistics ==
Legend
GP	Games played	GS	Games started	MPG	Minutes per game
FG%	Field goal percentage	3P%	3-point field goal percentage	FT%	Free throw percentage
RPG	Rebounds per game	APG	Assists per game	SPG	Steals per game
BPG	Blocks per game	PPG	Points per game	**Bold**	Career high

Year	Team	GP	GS	MPG	FG%	3P%	FT%	RPG	APG	SPG	BPG	PPG
2009-10	Tochigi	18	0	4.9	43.3	0.0	66.7	0.7	0.7	0.1	0.0	2.3
2010-11	Tochigi	10	0	7.4	30.8	14.3	44.4	0.8	1.0	0.1	0.0	2.1
2011-12	Ryukyu	52	40	27.2	41.7	30.4	64.2	4.1	4.2	1.2	0.1	11.0
2012-13	Ryukyu	50	49	29.0	37.8	26.7	72.3	4.8	6.2	1.5	0.1	11.5
2013-14	Ryukyu	16	0	20.2	29.7	28.6	70.0	2.4	2.9	1.0	0.1	5.0
2014-15	Ryukyu	52	3	21.7	38.4	33.3	74.1	3.1	3.0	0.8	0.1	7.8
2015-16	Osaka	52	25	24.6	39.5	25.6	70.9	3.2	4.3	1.3	0.1	8.0
2016-17	Shiga	46	32	25.0	37.9	27.1	70.4	3.5	4.2	1.0	0.1	9.9
2017-18	Shiga	59	59	27.9	40.0	29.0	79.1	3.2	7.4	1.5	0.0	12.2
2018-19	Ryukyu	57	49	23.0	45.3	23.5	78.4	2.5	6.4	0.9	0.1	8.9
