= Tatsunori =

- Gender: Male

Origin
- Origin: Japanese
- Meaning: Different meanings depending on the kanji used

Tatsunori (written: 辰徳, 辰基, 建典 or 達宣) is a masculine Japanese given name. Notable people with the name include:

- Tatsunori Arai (新居 辰基; born 1983), Japanese footballer
- Tatsunori Fujie (藤江 建典; born 1987), Japanese basketball player
- Tatsunori Hara (原 辰徳; born 1958), Japanese baseball player and manager
- Tatsunori Hisanaga (久永 辰徳; born 1977), Japanese footballer
- Tatsunori Otsuka (大塚 達宣; born 2000), Japanese volleyball player
- Tatsunori Yamagata (山形 辰徳; born 1983), Japanese footballer
- Tatsunori Tsujimoto (辻本達規; born 1991), Japanese actor and musical artist
