= Yamane (surname) =

Yamane (written: 山根) is a Japanese surname. Notable people with the surname include:

- Aya Yamane (山根 綺, born 1997), Japanese voice actress
- Ayano Yamane (山根 綾乃), Japanese manga artist
- Erina Yamane (山根 恵里奈, born 1990), Japanese women's footballer
- Hidehiko Yamane (山根 英彦), Japanese clothing designer
- Hoshiko Yamane (山根 星子, born 1981), Japanese violinist and composer
- Iwao Yamane (山根 巌, born 1976), Japanese footballer
- Kenji Yamane (山根 謙二, born 1967), Japanese basketball coach
- Kimitoshi Yamane (山根 公利, born 1966), Japanese mechanical designer
- Mai Yamane (山根 麻以, born 1958), Japanese singer
- Michiru Yamane (山根 ミチル, born 1963), Japanese video game composer and pianist
- Miki Yamane (山根 視来, born 1993), Japanese footballer
- Mitsuo Yamane (山根 三雄, born 1924), Japanese sport shooter
- Ryan Yamane (born 1969), American politician
- Ryuji Yamane (山根 隆治, born 1948), Japanese politician
- Seigan Yamane (山根 清玩, born 1952), Japanese Hagi Pottery Artisan
- Tomoe Yamane (山根 朋恵, born 1986), Japanese women's ice hockey player
- Toshio Yamane (山根 敏郎, born 1953), Japanese photographer
- Towa Yamane (山根 永遠, born 1999), Japanese footballer
- Yui Yamane (山根 優衣, born 1994), Japanese swimmer

== Fictional characters ==
- Tasuku Yamane (山根 たすく), a character in the anime series Trickster
- Yoshitaka Yamane (山根 義隆), a character in the manga series Major
