= Patrick Simon =

Patrick Simon may refer to:

- Patrick Simon (basketball)
- Patrick Simon (politician)
