= Daiki Kanei =

Japanese footballer

Personal information
- Full name: Daiki Kanei
- Date of birth: 8 December 1987 (age 38)
- Place of birth: Fukuoka, Japan
- Height: 1.85 m (6 ft 1 in)
- Position: Goalkeeper

Team information
- Current team: Roasso Kumamoto
- Number: 21

Youth career
- 1998–2003: Chikugo Southern FC Estrela
- 2004–2006: Hakozaki Seisho Junior High School
- 2007–2009: Fukuoka Daiichi High School

Senior career*
| Years | Team | Apps | (Gls) |
| 2010–2011 | Japan Soccer College | 4 | (0) |
| 2010 | → Albirex Niigata (loan) | 0 | (0) |
| 2011–2013 | Kataller Toyama | 0 | (0) |
| 2014–2016 | Roasso Kumamoto | 8 | (0) |
| 2015 | → Oita Trinita (loan) | 0 | (0) |
- * Club domestic league appearances and goals

Daiki Kanei (金井大樹, Kanei, Daiki; born 8 December 1987 in Fukuoka) is a former Japanese footballer.

== Club statistics ==
| Club performance | | | League | | Cup | | Total | |
| Season | Club | League | Apps | Goals | Apps | Goals | Apps | Goals |
| Japan | | | League | | Emperor's Cup | | Total | |
|---|---|---|---|---|---|---|---|---|
| 2010 | Albirex Niigata | J1 League | 0 | 0 | 0 | 0 | 0 | 0 |
| 2011 | Kataller Toyama | J2 League | 0 | 0 | 0 | 0 | 0 | 0 |
| 2012 | Kataller Toyama | J2 League | 0 | 0 | 0 | 0 | 0 | 0 |
| 2013 | Kataller Toyama | J2 League | 0 | 0 | 0 | 0 | 0 | 0 |
| 2014 | Roasso Kumamoto | J2 League | 6 | 0 | 1 | 0 | 7 | 0 |
| 2015 | Roasso Kumamoto | J2 League | 2 | 0 | – | | 2 | 0 |
| 2015 | Oita Trinita | J2 League | 0 | 0 | 0 | 0 | 0 | 0 |
| 2016 | Roasso Kumamoto | J2 League | 0 | 0 | 2 | 0 | 2 | 0 |
| Career total | | | 8 | 0 | 3 | 0 | 11 | 0 |
