= Honoo Hamaguchi =

Japanese basketball coach

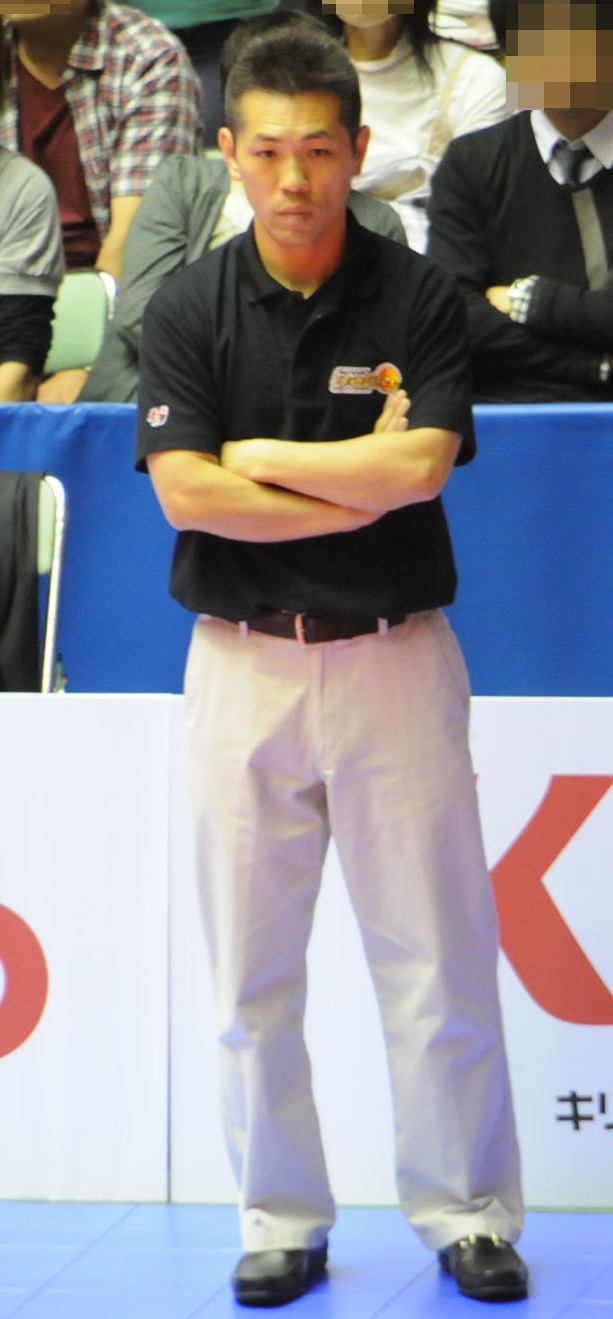

Toyama Grouses
- Position: Head coach
- League: B.League

Personal information
- Born: December 17, 1971 (age 54) Ōshima, Tokyo

Career information
- High school: Mukogaoka (Bunkyō, Tokyo)
- College: Aichi Gakusen University
- Coaching career: 2004–present

Career history

Coaching
- 2004–2005: Toyota Alvark (asst)
- 2005-2011: Sendai 89ers
- 2011-2020: Kyoto Hannaryz
- 2020-present: Toyama Grouses

Honoo Hamaguchi (浜口 炎, Hamaguchi Honō) (born in December 1971) is a Japanese basketball coach. He originates from Oshima Island. As of 2011 Hamaguchi had been a part of the Japanese basketball league longer than most of the other coaches of Japanese basketball teams had been a part. Ed Odeven of The Japan Times said that Hamaguchi works for success but does not seek attention despite being in a social media era.

For six seasons of the existence of the Sendai 89ers, Hamaguchi served as the coach. He began as the coach of the Sendai 89ers after the team entered the bj-league in 2005. In 2011 Hamaguchi's coaching of the Sendai 89ers ended after the 2011 Tōhoku earthquake and tsunami occurred. He is now the coach of the Kyoto Hannaryz.

Ed Odeven said that Hamaguchi has "quirks" and sometimes an "overbearing coaching style." In regards to Marcus Cousin playing for the Kyoto team, in 2012 a former Hannaryz player asked "He should obviously dominate, but it is all about how his personality will deal with Honoo. Will Honoo let him be himself, or will Honoo try to control every little detail?"

== Head coaching record ==
Legend
Regular season	G	Games coached	W	Games won	L	Games lost	W–L %	Win–loss %
Playoffs	PG	Playoff games	PW	Playoff wins	PL	Playoff losses	PW–L %	Playoff win–loss %

Team	Year	G	W	L	W–L%	Finish	PG	PW	PL	PW–L%	Result
Sendai 89ers	2005-06	40	18	22	.450	4th	-	-	-	–	
Sendai 89ers	2006-07	40	19	21	.475	5th	-	-	-	–	
Sendai 89ers	2007-08	44	29	15	.659	1st in Eastern	2	1	1	.500	3rd place
Sendai 89ers	2008-09	52	31	21	.596	3rd in Eastern	2	0	2	.000	Lost in 1st round
Sendai 89ers	2009-10	52	35	17	.673	2nd in Eastern	3	1	2	.333	Lost in 1st round
Sendai 89ers	2010-11	36	24	12	.667	-	-	-	-	–	
Kyoto Hannaryz	2011-12	52	34	18	.654	3rd in Western	8	4	4	.500	4th place
Kyoto Hannaryz	2012-13	52	29	23	.558	5th in Western	7	5	2	.714	3rd place
Kyoto Hannaryz	2013-14	52	34	18	.654	2nd in Western	5	2	3	.400	4th place
Kyoto Hannaryz	2014-15	52	44	8	.846	1st in Western	5	3	2	.600	Lost in 2nd round
Kyoto Hannaryz	2015-16	52	41	11	.788	1st in Western	6	4	2	.667	4th place
Kyoto Hannaryz	2016-17	60	26	34	.433	4th in Western	-	-	-	–	-
Kyoto Hannaryz	2017-18	60	34	26	.567	2nd in Western	2	0	2	.000	Lost in 1st round
Kyoto Hannaryz	2018-19	60	31	29	.517	3rd in Western	-	-	-	–	-
Kyoto Hannaryz	2019-20	41	20	21	.488	4th in Western	-	-	-	–	-
