= Tracy Williams (basketball) =

American actor & basketball player/coach (born 1964)

Personal information
- Born: March 12, 1964 (age 62) New York

Career information
- High school: East Carteret High School
- College: Campbell
- Position: Head coach

Career history

Playing
- ?: Harlem Globetrotters

Coaching
- ?: AAU
- ?: USSSA
- 2012–2013: Saitama Broncos

Tracy Williams (born March 12, 1964) is an actor and former professional basketball player and former head coach of the Saitama Broncos in the Japanese Bj League.

== Head coaching record ==
Legend
Regular season	G	Games coached	W	Games won	L	Games lost	W–L %	Win–loss %
Playoffs	PG	Playoff games	PW	Playoff wins	PL	Playoff losses	PW–L %	Playoff win–loss %

Team	Year	G	W	L	W–L%	Finish	PG	PW	PL	PW–L%	Result
Saitama Broncos	2012–13	52	15	37	.288	10th in Bj Eastern	-	-	-	–	19th in Bj
