= Fukuoka Daiichi High School =

- 福岡第一高等学校, (Fukuoka Daiichi Kōtōgakkō)
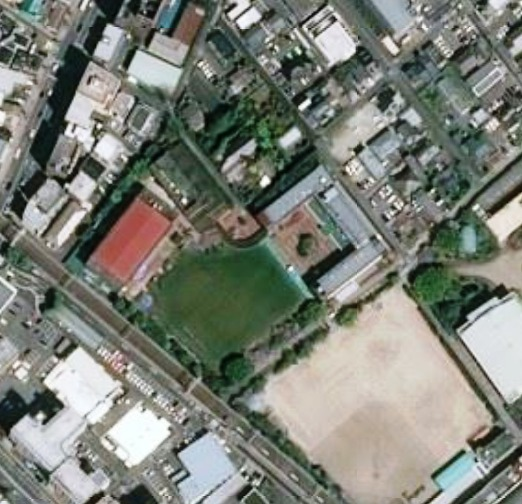

Location
- 22-1 Tamagawamachi, Minami Ward; Fukuoka Prefecture, Kyushu, 815-0037; Japan; 33.5654°N 130.4186°E

Information
- Type: Secondary
- Established: April 1956; 70 years ago
- Website: f.f-parama.ed.jp
- Last updated: November 16, 2019

Fukuoka Daiichi High School (福岡第一高等学校, Fukuoka Daiichi Kōtōgakkō) is a secondary school located in Fukuoka, on the Japanese island of Kyushu. The school's Department for International Education is well known for its Tsuzuki International Scholarship/Exchange Program which allows Japanese and overseas students to live and study alongside each other in the Fukuoka Daiichi High School Guest House.

The establishment of the school was approved by Fukuoka Prefecture in April 1956.

The Tsuzuki International Scholarship Program (都築国際奨学金制度, Tsuzuki Kokusai Shōgakukin Seido) is a scholarship allowing secondary school students to live and study alongside Japanese students in the Fukuoka Daiichi High School Guest House for girls, and Troubadour for boys, a dormitory primarily for the baseballers and basketballers, in Fukuoka, Japan. The program is administered by the Department for International Education of the Fukuoka Daiichi High School.

== Notable alumni ==
- Chage
- Tatsunori Fujie
- Naoko Hayashiba
- Seiji Ikaruga
- Daiki Kanei
- Yusuke Karino
- Yukinaga Maeda
- Seiji Matsuyama
- Satoshi Nagano
- Narito Namizato
- Dai-Kang Yang
- Yuki Kawamura
