= Noriyuki Sugasawa =

Japanese basketball player

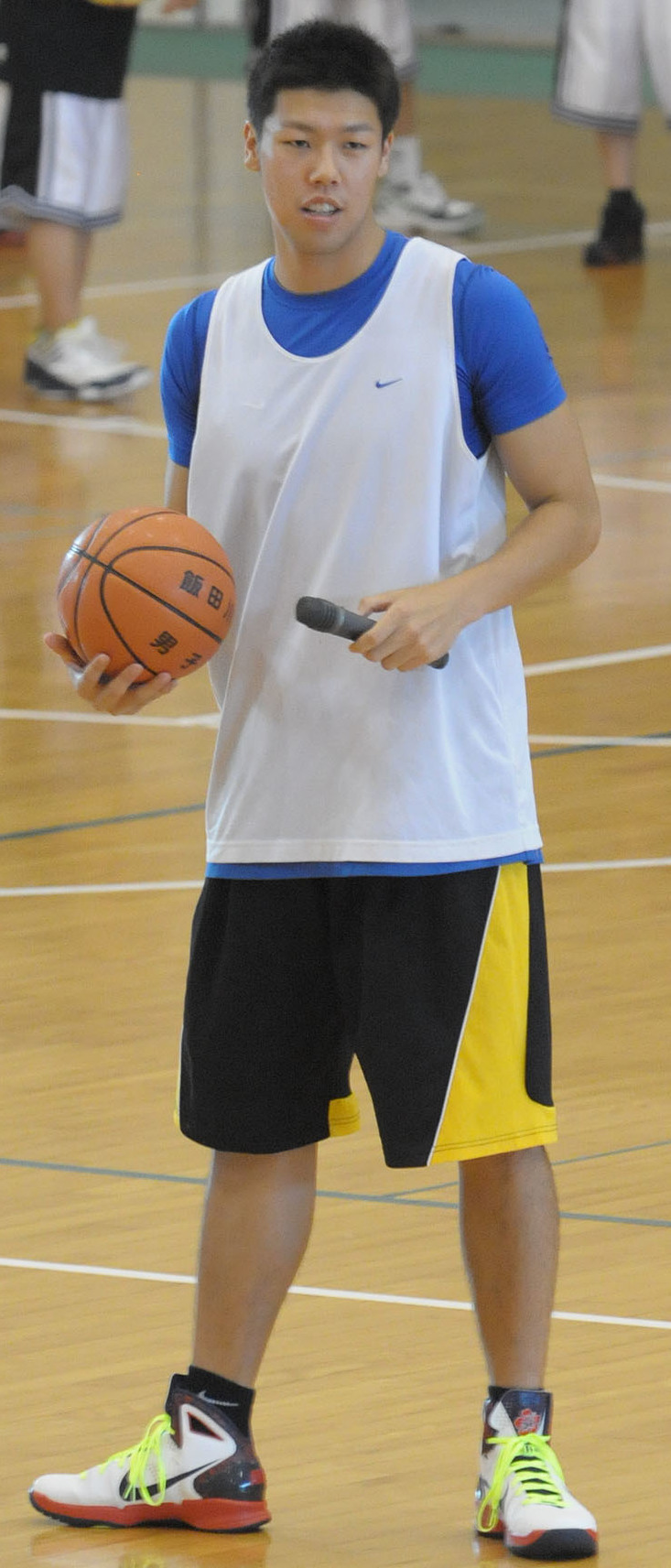
- Nori Sugasawa in 2013

No. 10 – Kumamoto Volters
- Position: Forward
- League: B.League

Personal information
- Born: February 3, 1987 (age 39) Tsuchiura, Ibaraki, Japan
- Listed height: 6 ft 4 in (1.93 m)
- Listed weight: 192 lb (87 kg)

Career information
- High school: Ishikawa (Uruma, Okinawa)
- College: National Institute of Fitness and Sports in Kanoya (2006–2010)
- Playing career: 2010–present

Career history
- 2010–2012: TGI D-Rise
- 2012-2013: Gunma Crane Thunders
- 2013-2017: Akita Northern Happinets
- 2017-2018: Iwate Big Bulls
- 2018-2019: Sendai 89ers
- 2019-2020: Toyama Grouses
- 2020: Kyoto Hannaryz
- 2021-2022: Nagasaki Velca
- 2022-present: Kumamoto Volters

Noriyuki Sugasawa (菅澤 紀行, Sugasawa Noriyuki; born 3 February 1987) is a Japanese professional basketball player who plays for Nagasaki Velca of the B.League in Japan.

== Career ==
Following his college graduation, Sugasawa became a school teacher, but decided to be a professional basketball player. In 2012 he was picked up by the Gunma Crane Thunders with the first overall pick in the bj League draft. He has been a Happinets hooper since 2013. Former Head Coach Nakamura said that "Sugasawa is the best unsung player."

== Personal life ==
Sugasawa used to sell T-shirts at Brex Arena Utsunomiya when he belonged to the TGI D-Rise, a development club for Link Tochigi Brex. He can speak Okinawan language.

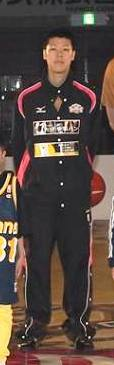
Sugasawa at pre-game show

== Career statistics ==
Legend
GP	Games played	GS	Games started	MPG	Minutes per game
FG%	Field goal percentage	3P%	3-point field goal percentage	FT%	Free throw percentage
RPG	Rebounds per game	APG	Assists per game	SPG	Steals per game
BPG	Blocks per game	PPG	Points per game	**Bold**	Career high

=== Regular season ===
Year	Team	GP	GS	MPG	FG%	3P%	FT%	RPG	APG	SPG	BPG	PPG
2011-12	TGI	27	8	15.6	50.0%	45.5%	61.0%	3.6	0.4	0.3	0	5.7
2012-13	Gunma	28	0	6.4	26.7%	21.1%	45.5%	0.9	0.2	0.3	0.1	2.1
2013-14	Akita	46	0	6.7	54.3%	-	47.6%	1.2	0.2	0.2	0	1.3
2014-15	Akita	24	0	4.6	44.4%	34.8%	83.3%	0.8	0.2	0.2	0.0	2.4
2015-16	Akita	47	0	10.6	41.3%	34.2%	76.6%	1.1	0.6	0.4	0.1	3.5
2016-17	Akita	56	7	11.3	24.6%	20.2%	73.9%	1.2	0.4	0.2	0.0	1.8
2017-18	Iwate	58	39	20.0	35.8%	22.4%	61.1%	3.6	1.5	0.8	0.1	5.9
2018-19	Sendai	58		10.8	40.7%	35.7%	74.3%	1.4	0.9	0.2	0.0	3.6
2019-20	Toyama	32	2	6.0	27.6%	26.3%	81.8%	0.9	0.2	0.1	0.0	1.6
2020-21	Kyoto	12		9.7	28.6%	20.0%	42.9%	1.0	0.8	0.0	0.1	1.5

=== Playoffs ===
Year	Team	GP	GS	MPG	FG%	3P%	FT%	RPG	APG	SPG	BPG	PPG
2013-14	Akita	3		1.33	.500	.000	.250	0	0.67	0	0	0.67
2016-17	Akita	3	0	24.12	.667	.000	.000	1.0	0.0	0	0	1.3
2017-18	Iwate	1	1	1.59	.000	.000	.000	0.0	0.0	0	0	0.0

=== Early cup games ===
Year	Team	GP	GS	MPG	FG%	3P%	FT%	RPG	APG	SPG	BPG	PPG
2017	Iwate	3	3	20:03	.267	.375	1.000	2.3	3.0	0.33	0.0	4.7
2018	Sendai	2	0	7:53	.000	.000	.500	1.5	0.5	0.0	0	0.5
2019	Toyama	2	0	4:31	.500	.500	.000	1.0	0.5	0.0	0	1.5
