= Yoshifumi Nakajima =

Japanese basketball player

Yoshifumi Nakajima 中島良史
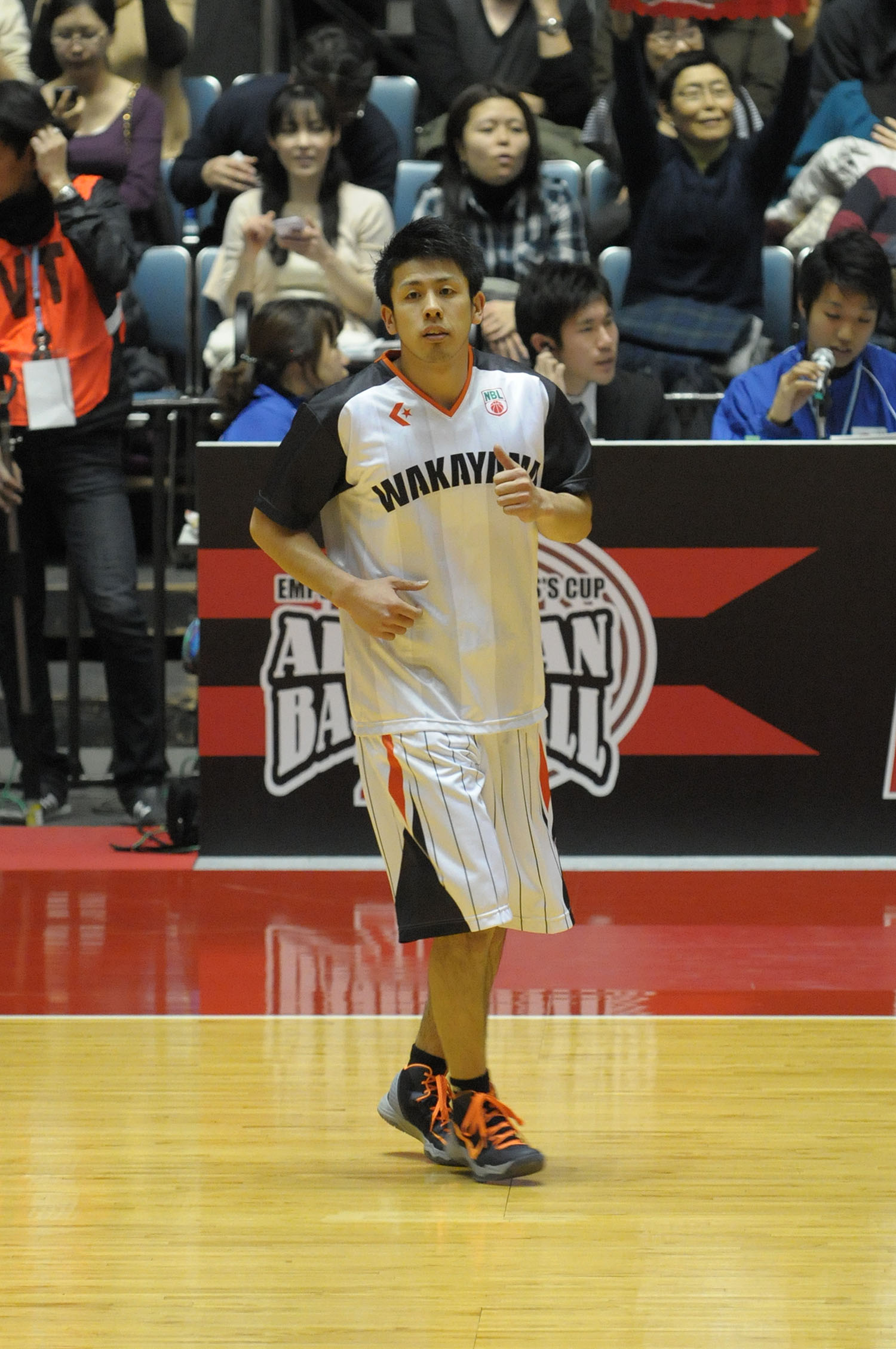
- Nakajima in 2014

No. 1 – Kagoshima Rebnise
- Position: Point Guard
- League: B.League

Personal information
- Born: September 25, 1990 (age 36) Kochi, Kochi, Japan
- Listed height: 5 ft 9 in (1.75 m)
- Listed weight: 172 lb (78 kg)

Career information
- High school: Meitoku Gijuku (Susaki, Kōchi)
- College: Tenri University
- Playing career: 2013-–present

Career history
- 2013-2014: Wakayama Trians
- 2014-2015: Akita Northern Happinets
- 2015-2016: Aomori Wat's
- 2016-2017: Ehime Orange Vikings
- 2017-2022: Passlab Yamagata Wyverns
- 2022-: Kagoshima Rebnise

Yoshifumi Nakajima (born September 25, 1990), nicknamed Gottsu, is a Japanese professional basketball player who plays for the Passlab Yamagata Wyverns of the B.League in Japan. He was selected by the Akita Northern Happinets with the second overall pick in the 2014 bj League draft.

== Career statistics ==
Legend
GP	Games played	GS	Games started	MPG	Minutes per game
FG%	Field goal percentage	3P%	3-point field goal percentage	FT%	Free throw percentage
RPG	Rebounds per game	APG	Assists per game	SPG	Steals per game
BPG	Blocks per game	PPG	Points per game	**Bold**	Career high

=== Regular season ===
Year	Team	GP	GS	MPG	FG%	3P%	FT%	RPG	APG	SPG	BPG	PPG
2013-14	Wakayama	9	0	3.0	.333	.000	.333	0.6	0.1	0.3	0.1	1.1
2014-15	Akita	17		5.2	.432	.286	.500	0.9	0.6	0.1	0	2.2
2015-16	Aomori	44		9.3	.384	.306	.900	1.3	0.6	0.3	0.0	2.4
2016-17	Ehime	60	48	23.5	.479	.368	.742	3.6	1.3	0.8	0.0	7.4
2017-18	Yamagata	60	53	26.5	.359	.286	.814	3.0	2.6	0.8	0.1	7.2
2018-19	Yamagata	57	55	31.29	.427	.342	.724	3.2	4.9	0.7	0.0	11.9
2019-20	Yamagata	47	39	25.9	.378	.309	.763	2.6	3.1	0.5	0.0	6.9

=== Playoffs ===
Year	Team	GP	GS	MPG	FG%	3P%	FT%	RPG	APG	SPG	BPG	PPG
2015-16	Aomori	2		13.50	.286	.143	1.000	0.5	0.0	1.0	0	7.5

=== Early cup games ===
Year	Team	GP	GS	MPG	FG%	3P%	FT%	RPG	APG	SPG	BPG	PPG
2017	Yamagata	2	1	28.06	.333	.250	.333	2.5	4.0	1.5	0.5	6.5

== Gallery ==
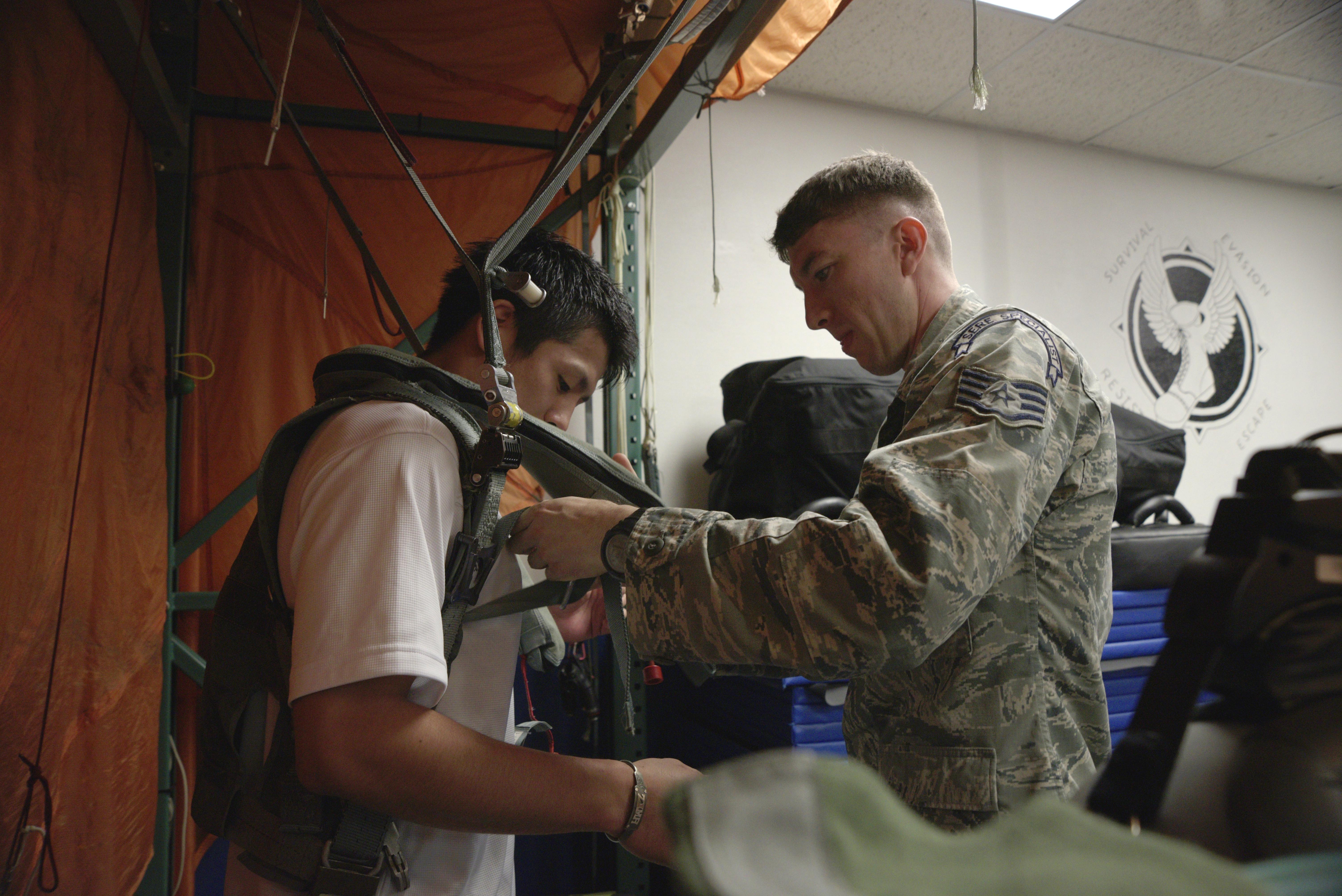

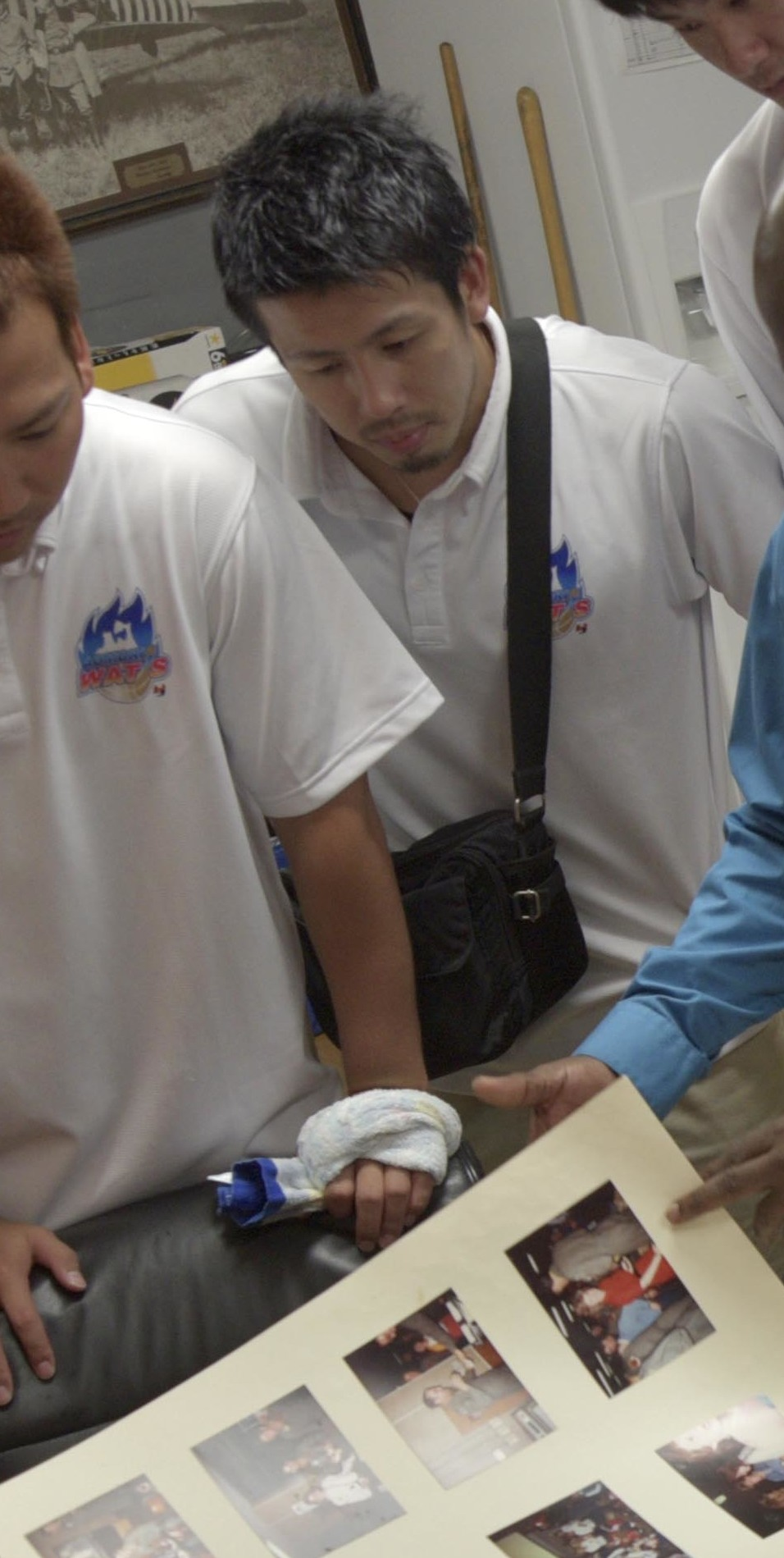

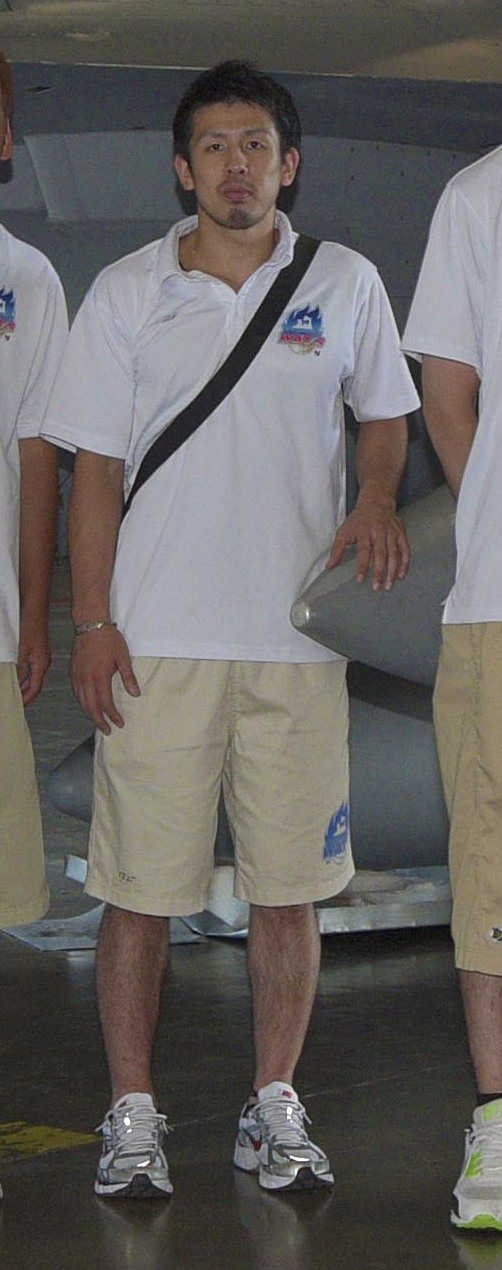
