= Darko Čohadarević =

Serbian basketball player

Free agent
- Position: Power forward / center

Personal information
- Born: March 7, 1986 (age 40) SR Serbia, SFR Yugoslavia
- Listed height: 2.05 m (6 ft 9 in)
- Listed weight: 110 kg (243 lb)

Career information
- College: Texas Tech (2008–2010)
- NBA draft: 2010: undrafted
- Playing career: 2010–present

Career history
- 2010–2011: AEK
- 2011: Angelico Biella
- 2011: Zlatorog Laško
- 2012: Ilysiakos
- 2012: BC Kutaisi 2010
- 2012–2013: AEK Larnaca
- 2013: Hawke's Bay Hawks
- 2013–2014: Gunma Crane Thunders
- 2014: Osaka Evessa
- 2014: Al Nasr Riyadh
- 2015: ZTE KK
- 2015: Radès
- 2015–2016: Al-Ahli Jeddah
- 2016: Caen Basket Calvados
- 2017: Rabotnički
- 2017–2018: BK Olomoucko
- 2018–2019: Burevestnik

Darko Čohadarević (Serbian Cyrillic: Дарко Чохадаревић; born 7 March 1986) is a Serbian professional basketball player, who plays as a power forward for BK Olomoucko of the National Basketball League.
