= Fujitaka Hiraoka =

Japanese basketball player and coach

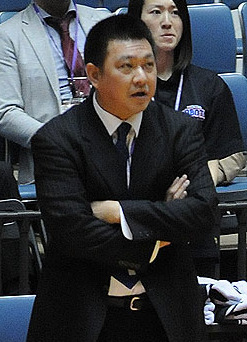
- Hiraoka in 2016

Niigata Albirex BB
- Position: Head coach
- League: B.League

Personal information
- Born: April 26, 1974 (age 52) Tsukuba, Ibaraki

Career information
- High school: Tsuchiura Nichidai (Tsuchiura, Ibaraki)
- College: Nihon University
- Coaching career: 2005–present

Career history

Playing
- 1997-2000: Aichi Machine Industry
- 2000-2005: Niigata Albirex BB

Coaching
- 2005-2013: Niigata Albirex BB (asst.)
- 2013–2015: Niigata Albirex BB
- 2015-2016: Cyberdyne Ibaraki Robots
- 2016-2021: Gunma Crane Thunders
- 2021-present: Niigata Albirex BB

Career highlights
- As player: Japanese College Champions; Japanese High School Champions; Japanese Junior High Champions

Fujitaka Hiraoka (平岡 富士貴, Hiraoka Fujitaka) is the Head coach of the Niigata Albirex BB in the Japanese B.League.

== Head coaching record ==
Legend
Regular season	G	Games coached	W	Games won	L	Games lost	W–L %	Win–loss %
Playoffs	PG	Playoff games	PW	Playoff wins	PL	Playoff losses	PW–L %	Playoff win–loss %

Team	Year	G	W	L	W–L%	Finish	PG	PW	PL	PW–L%	Result
Niigata Albirex BB	2013-14	52	31	21	.596	5th in Eastern	5	2	3	.400	Lost in 2nd round
Niigata Albirex BB	2014-15	52	36	16	.692	4th in Eastern	5	3	2	.600	Lost in 2nd round
Cyberdyne Tsukuba Robots	2015-16	55	8	47	.145	12th	-	-	-	–	-
Gunma Crane Thunders	2016-17	60	40	20	.667	1st in B2 Eastern	3	0	3	.000	4th in B2
Gunma Crane Thunders	2017-18	60	32	28	.533	3rd in B2 Central	-	-	-	–	-
Gunma Crane Thunders	2018-19	60	43	17	.717	1st in B2 Eastern	5	2	3	.400	Runners-up in B2
Gunma Crane Thunders	2019-20	47	34	13	.723	2nd in B2 Eastern	-	-	-	–	-
