= Shimoji (surname) =

Shimoji (written: 下地, Miyakoan: Sïmuzï) is a Ryukyuan surname. Notable people with the surname include:

- Kazuaki Shimoji (下地 一明; born 1976), Japanese basketball coach
- Mikio Shimoji (下地 幹郎; born 1961), Japanese politician
- Shino Shimoji (下地 紫野), Japanese voice actress and singer
- Sho Shimoji (下地 奨; born 1985), Japanese footballer
