= Miodrag Rajković =

Serbian professional basketball coach (born 1971)

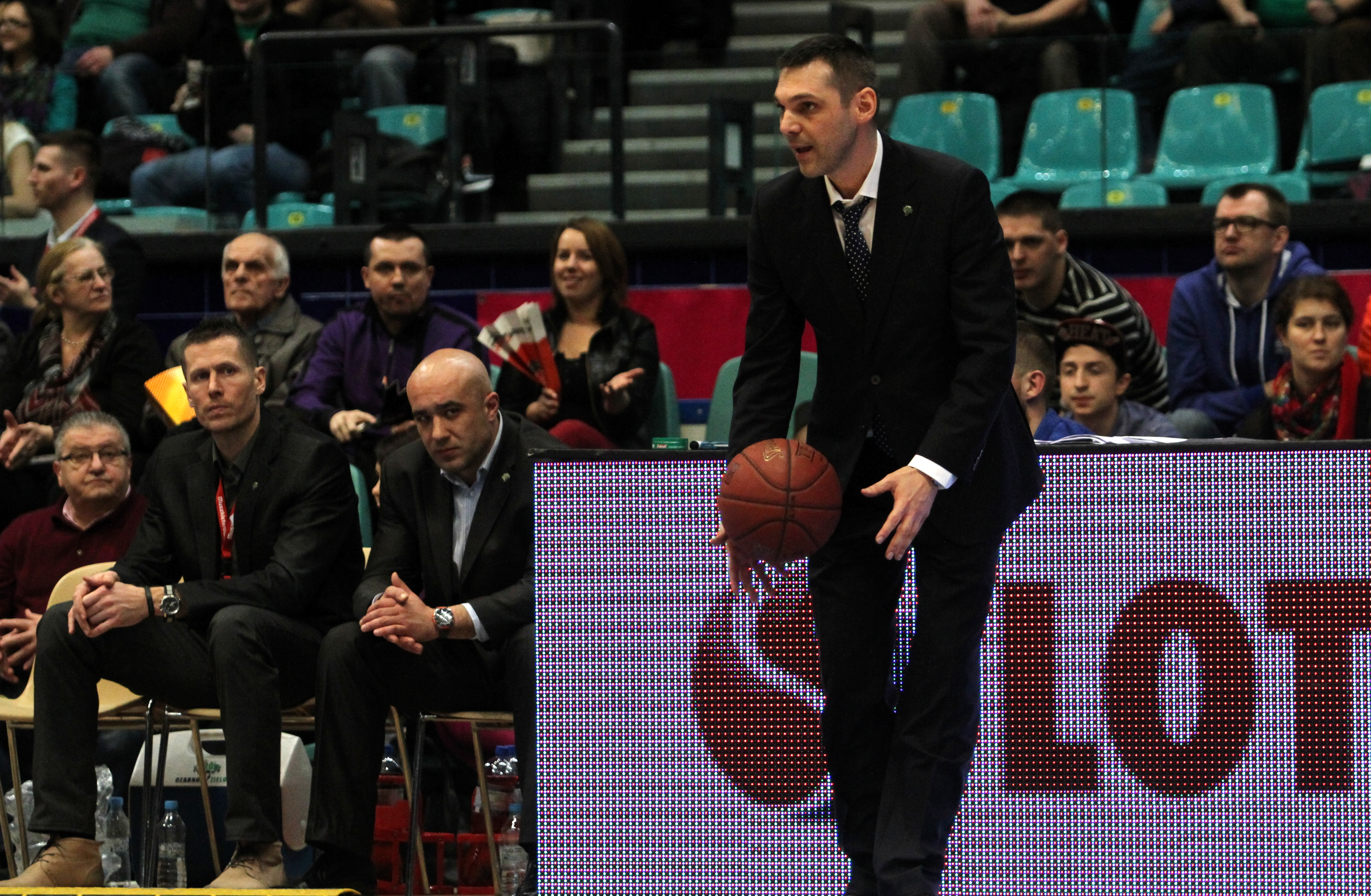

BC Astana
- Position: Head coach
- League: VTB United League

Personal information
- Born: 8 March 1971 (age 55) Belgrade, Serbia

Career information
- College: University of Belgrade
- Coaching career: 1994–present

Career history

Coaching
- 2000: Radnički Belgrade (assistant)
- 2001: Crvena zvezda (assistant)
- 2002–2003: Vojvodina (assistant)
- 2004–2005: Radnički Belgrade
- 2005: Budućnost (assistant)
- 2006–2008: Hemofarm (assistant)
- 2009–2010: Mega Vizura
- 2011–2012: Śląsk Wrocław
- 2012–2015: Turów Zgorzelec
- 2017–2018: Toyama Grouses
- 2018–2019: Nishinomiya Storks
- 2019–2020: Tokyo Hachioji Bee Trains
- 2020–2021: Yamagata Wyverns
- 2023–2024: Szolnoki Olajbányász
- 2024: Śląsk Wrocław
- 2025–2026: KK Split
- 2026–present: BC Astana

Career highlights
- As head coach: PLK Coach of the Year (2014)

Miodrag Rajković (Serbian Cyrillic: Миодраг Рајковић, born 8 March 1971) is a Serbian professional basketball coach, currently serving as the head coach for BC Astana of the VTB United League.

== Head coaching record ==
Legend
Regular season	G	Games coached	W	Games won	L	Games lost	W–L %	Win–loss %
Playoffs	PG	Playoff games	PW	Playoff wins	PL	Playoff losses	PW–L %	Playoff win–loss %

Team	Year	G	W	L	W–L%	Finish	PG	PW	PL	PW–L%	Result
Toyama Grouses	2017-18	60	24	36	.400	5th in Central	-	-	-	–	-
Nishinomiya Storks	2018-19	60	34	26	.567	3rd in B2 Central	-	-	-	–	-
