= Masato Fukushima =

Japanese basketball player and coach

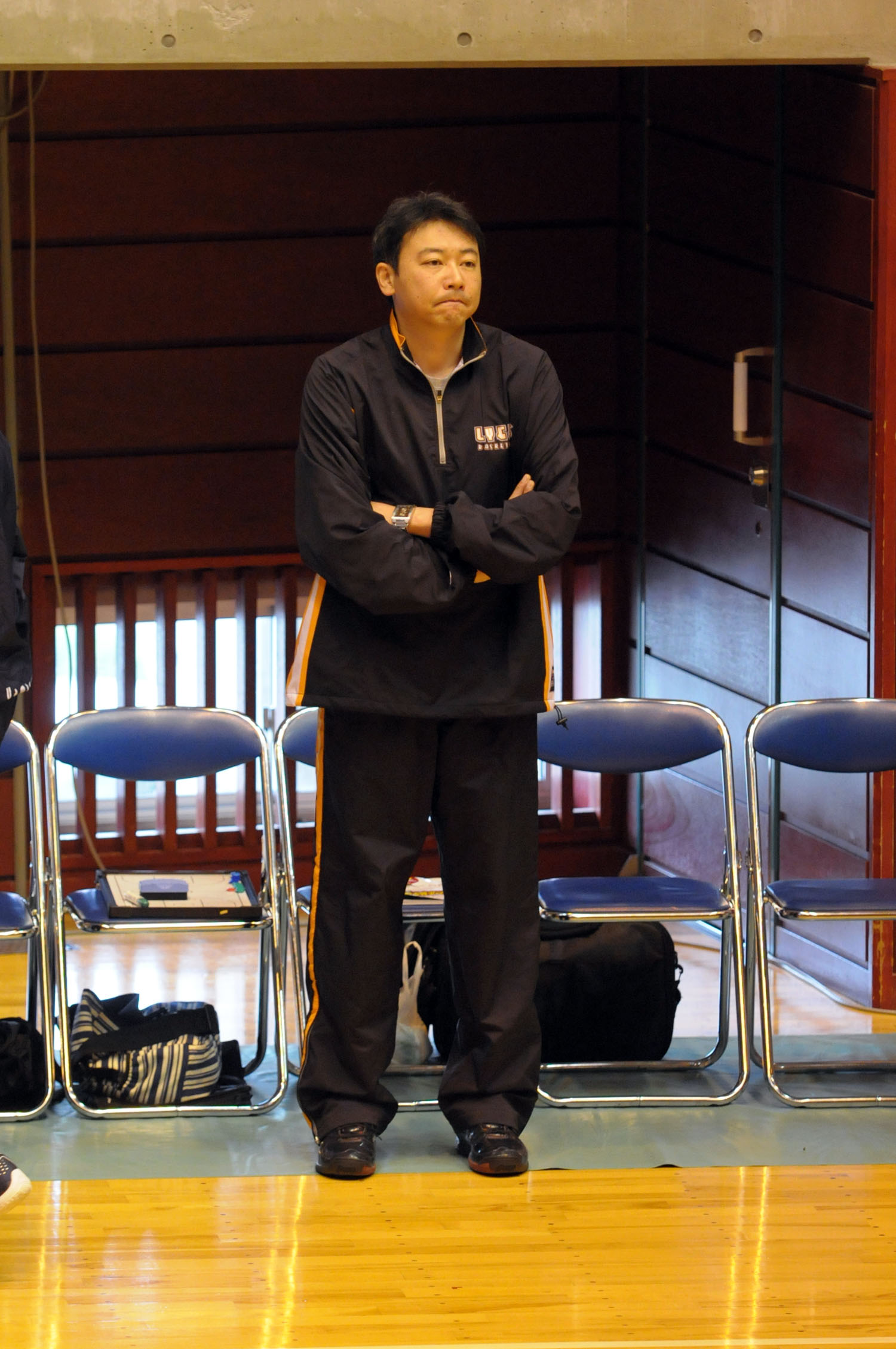

Passlab Yamagata Wyverns
- Position: Assistant coach

Personal information
- Born: September 22, 1970 (age 56) Osaka Prefecture

Career information
- High school: Rakunan (Kyoto, Kyoto)
- College: Kyoto Sangyo University
- Playing career: 1993–1997

Career history

Playing
- 1993-1997: Mitsubishi Electric

Coaching
- 1997-2002: Mitsubishi Electric (asst)
- 2002-2006: Mitsubishi Electric
- 2006-2008: Toyama Grouses
- 2009-2010: Saitama Broncos
- 2011-2020: Yamagata Bank
- 2020-present: Passlab Yamagata Wyverns (asst)

Career highlights

Masato Fukushima (福島雅人, Fukushima Masato) is the assistant coach of the Passlab Yamagata Wyverns.

== Head coaching record ==
Legend
Regular season	G	Games coached	W	Games won	L	Games lost	W–L %	Win–loss %
Playoffs	PG	Playoff games	PW	Playoff wins	PL	Playoff losses	PW–L %	Playoff win–loss %

Team	Year	G	W	L	W–L%	Finish	PG	PW	PL	PW–L%	Result
Mitsubishi Electric	2002-03	21	9	12	.429	5th	-	-	-	–	-
Mitsubishi Electric	2003-04	28	16	12	.571	3rd	3	2	1	.667	3rd
Mitsubishi Electric	2004-05	28	16	12	.571	3rd	3	2	1	.667	3rd
Toyama Grouses	2006-07	40	13	27	.325	7th	-	-	-	–	-
Toyama Grouses	2007-08	44	7	37	.159	5th in Eastern	-	-	-	–	-
Toyama Grouses	2008	10	3	7	.300	Fired	-	-	-	–	-
Saitama Broncos	2009-10	52	17	35	.327	5th in Eastern	-	-	-	–	-
