= Joe Cook (basketball) =

Canadian basketball coach

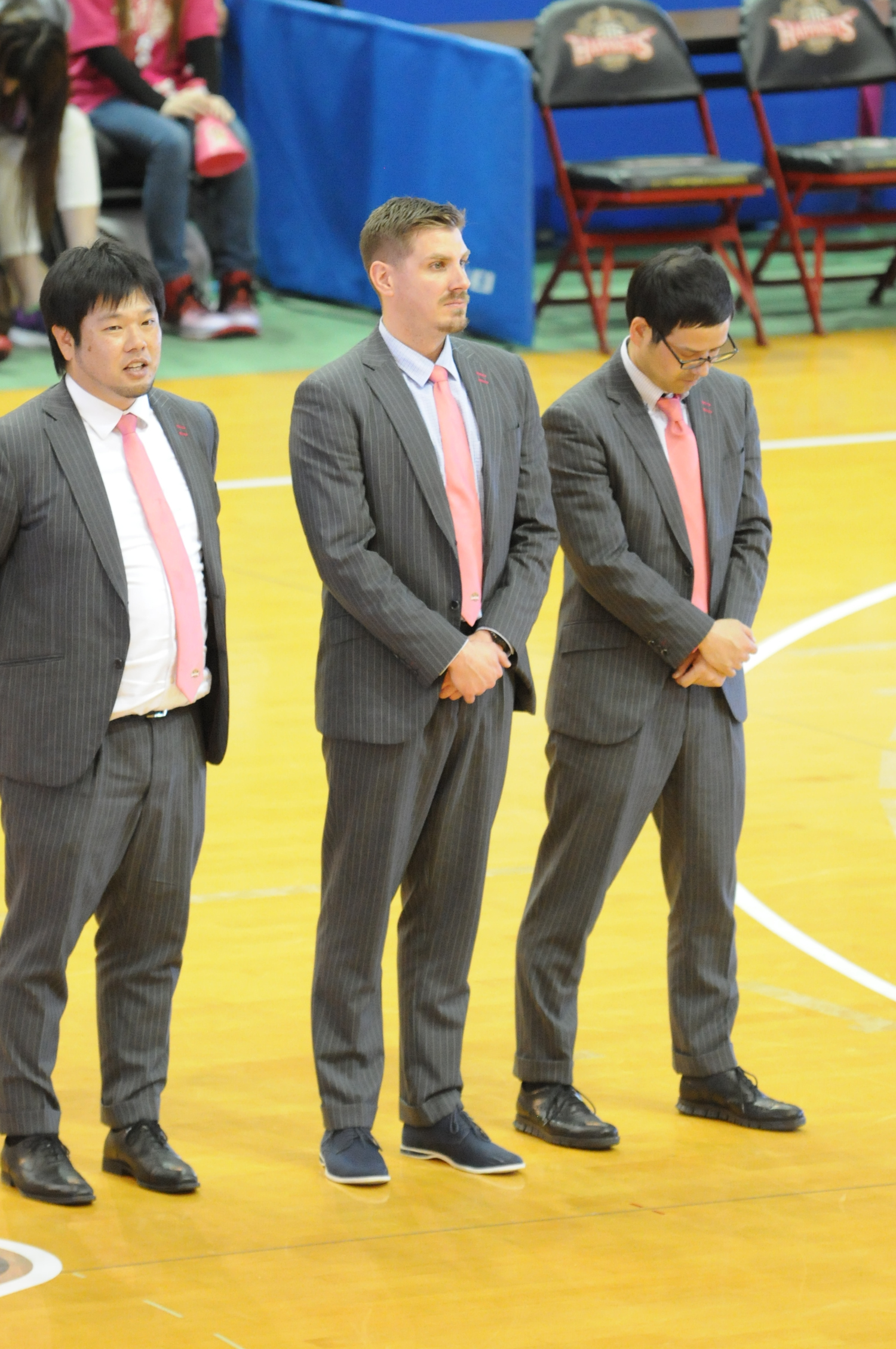
- Coaching career: 2008–present

Career history

Coaching
- 2008–2009: Cabrillo College (assistant)
- 2013–2014: Brampton A's (assistant)
- 2014–2017: Akita Northern Happinets (assistant)
- 2017–2018: Passlab Yamagata Wyverns
- 2018–2019: San-en NeoPhoenix (associate HC)

Joseph Michael Cook is a professional basketball coach.

== Career ==
Cook was a college basketball assistant coach for Cabrillo College. In 2010 he became assistant video coordinator for the Sacramento Kings of the NBA, and was then head video coordinator for two years. After working as an assistant coach for the Brampton A's of the National Basketball League of Canada in 2013–14, he moved to Japan, where he was assistant coach for the Akita Northern Happinets for three seasons, introducing NBA-style sets and styles of play.

In 2017 he was hired as executive coach of the Passlab Yamagata Wyverns, replacing Koju Munakata. After one season he became assistant head coach for San-en NeoPhoenix.

== Head coaching record ==
Legend
| Regular season | G | Games coached | W | Games won | L | Games lost | W–L % | Win–loss % |
| Playoffs | PG | Playoff games | PW | Playoff wins | PL | Playoff losses | PW–L % | Playoff win–loss % |

| Team | Year | G | W | L | W–L% | Finish | PG | PW | PL | PW–L% | Result |
|---|---|---|---|---|---|---|---|---|---|---|---|
| Passlab Yamagata Wyverns | 2017-18 | 46 | 19 | 27 | .413 | Fired | - | - | - | – | - |
