= Takatoshi Ishibashi =

Japanese basketball player (1968–2026)

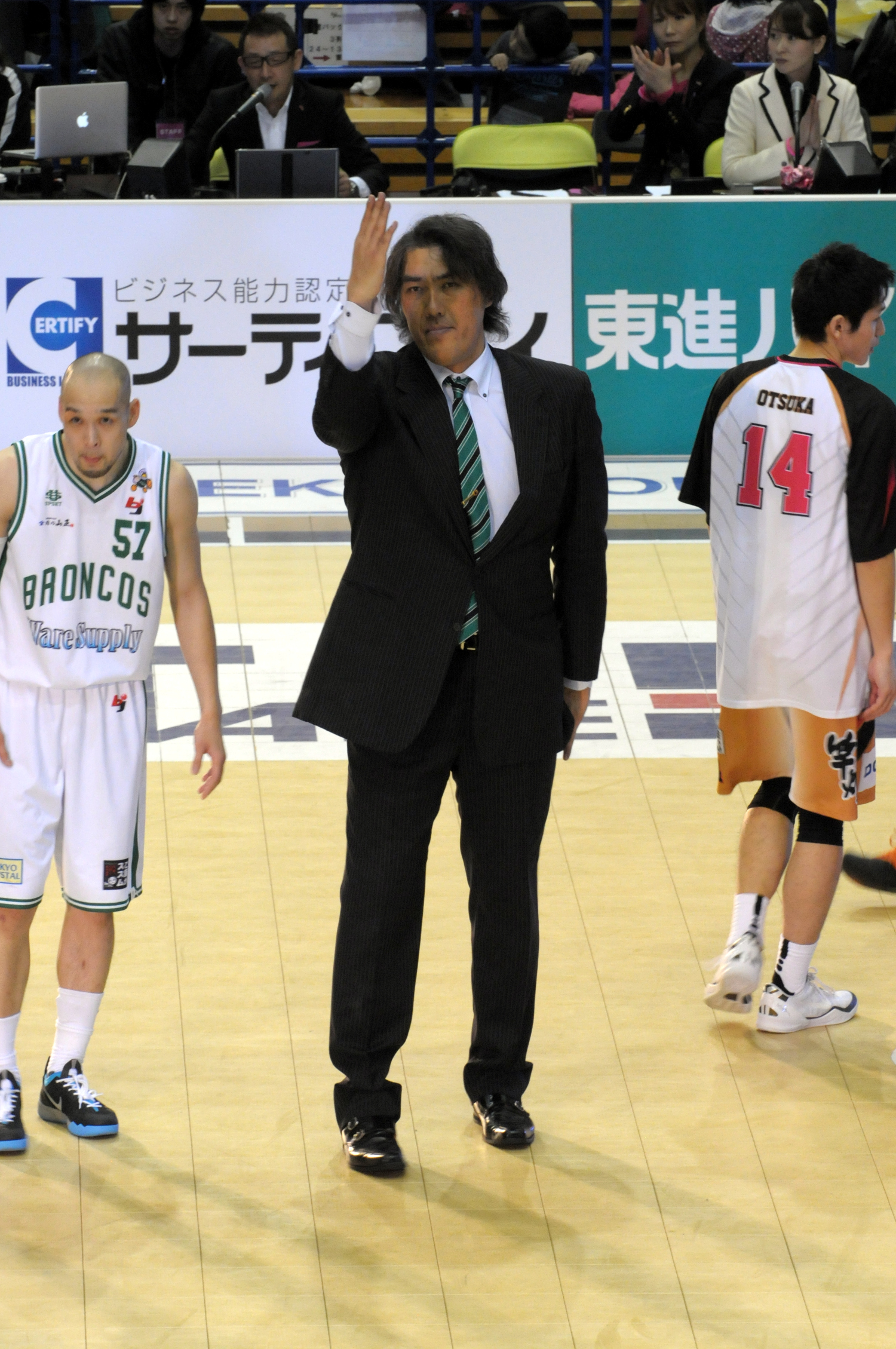

Personal information
- Born: September 26, 1968 Hamamasu, Hokkaido, Japan
- Died: November 20, 2026 (aged 58)
- Listed height: 210 cm (6 ft 11 in)
- Listed weight: 140 kg (309 lb)

Career information
- High school: Hokkaido Sapporo Kaisei (Sapporo, Hokkaido)
- College: Hokkai Gakuen University
- Playing career: 1992–2007
- Position: Head coach

Career history

Playing
- 1992–1998: Nikko Kyoseki/Japan Energy
- 1998–2000: Dai Nippon Printing Eagles
- 2000–2007: Toyama Grouses

Coaching
- 2008–2009: Toyama Grouses
- 2009–2010: Shiga Lakestars (asst)
- 2010–2011: Shiga Lakestars
- 2011–2012: Shinshu Brave Warriors (asst)
- 2012–2013: Shinshu Brave Warriors
- 2013–2014: Saitama Broncos
- 2014–2017: Wakayama Trians (asst)
- 2017–2019: Tokyo Hachioji Trains

Career highlights
- JBL Rookie of the Year (1993)
Medals
Men's basketball
Representing Japan
FIBA Asia Cup
Bronze medal – third place	1995 Seoul	Japan

Takatoshi Ishibashi (石橋貴俊, Ishibashi Takatoshi; September 26, 1968 – November 20, 2026) was a Japanese basketball player and coach. He was the head coach of the Tokyo Hachioji Bee Trains in the Japanese B.League. He played college basketball for Hokkai Gakuen University. He was selected by the Toyama Grouses with the 14th overall pick in the 2006 bj League draft.

== Head coaching record ==
Legend
Regular season	G	Games coached	W	Games won	L	Games lost	W–L %	Win–loss %
Playoffs	PG	Playoff games	PW	Playoff wins	PL	Playoff losses	PW–L %	Playoff win–loss %

Team	Year	G	W	L	W–L%	Finish	PG	PW	PL	PW–L%	Result
Toyama Grouses	2008-09	42	8	34	.190	6th in Eastern	-	-	-	–	-
Shiga Lakestars	2010-11	34	19	15	.559	Fired	-	-	-	–	-
Shinshu Brave Warriors	2012-13	52	17	35	.327	9th in Eastern	-	-	-	–	-
Saitama Broncos	2013-14	52	5	47	.096	11th in Eastern	-	-	-	–	-
Hiroshima Lightning	2016	2	0	2	.000	-	-	-	-	–	-
Rizing Fukuoka	2016	2	0	2	.000	-	-	-	-	–	-
Tokyo Hachioji Trains	2017	20	15	5	.750	3rd in B3	10	5	5	.500	3rd in Final stage
Tokyo Hachioji Trains	2017-18	42	34	8	.810	1st in B3	20	17	3	.850	1st in Final stage
