= Yamato Citizens Gymnasium Maebashi =

Arena in Maebashi, Japan

Coordinates: 36°21′54.1″N 139°04′46.9″E

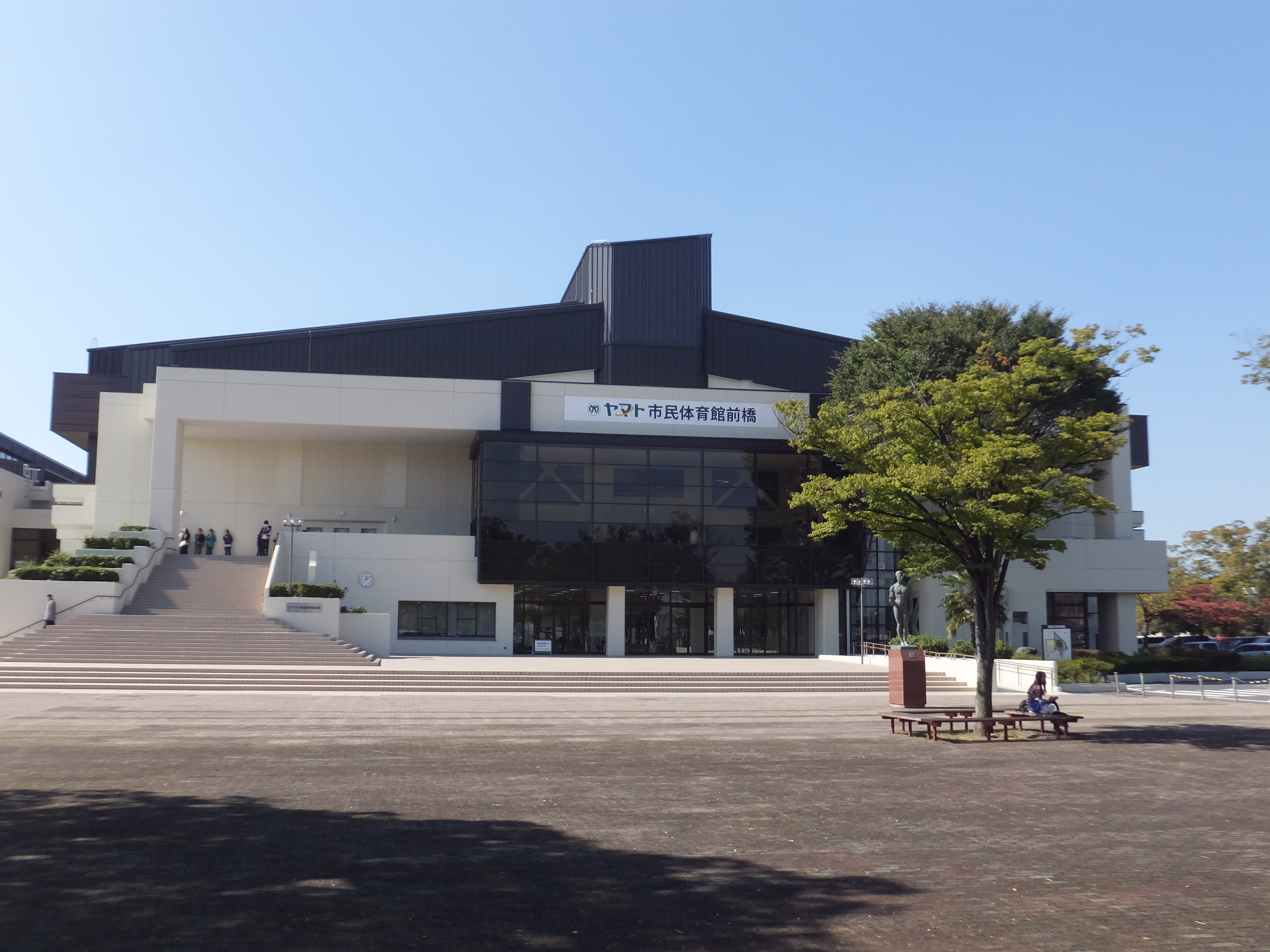
- Interactive map of Yamato Citizens Gymnasium Maebashi
- Full name: Naebashi Citizens Gymnasium
- Location: Maebashi, Gunma, Japan
- Owner: Maebashi city
- Operator: Maebashi city
- Capacity: 2,205

Construction
- Opened: 1980
- Renovated: 2016
- Cost

Tenant
- Gunma Crane Thunders

Website
- http://www.maebashi-cc.or.jp/shimintaiku/

Yamato Citizens Gymnasium Maebashi is an arena in Maebashi, Gunma, Japan. It is the home arena of the Gunma Crane Thunders of the B.League, Japan's professional basketball league.

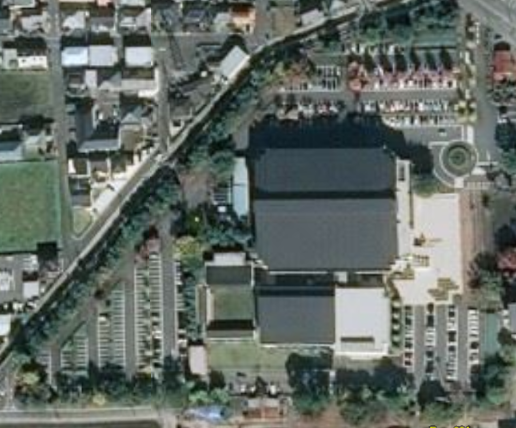
Satellite view
