= Charles Johnson (basketball, born 1961) =

American basketball player and coach

Personal information
- Born: December 19, 1961 (age 64) Texas
- Listed height: 201 cm (6 ft 7 in)

Career information
- High school: Midland (Midland, Texas)
- College: Midland (1979–1981); Texas Tech (1981–1983)
- NBA draft: 1983: undrafted
- Position: Head coach

Career history

Playing
- ?–?: Shooting Stars
- ?–?: Tarascos
- 1989–2003: Mazda/Ẽfini Tokyo/Tokorozawa

Coaching
- 2005–2006: Saitama Broncos
- 2009–2010: Toyama Grouses

Career highlights
- Liga Nacional de Baloncesto Profesional All-Star Game MVP

Charles Johnson(December 19, 1961 – ) is the former Head coach of the Saitama Broncos in the Japanese Bj League.

== Head coaching record ==
Legend
Regular season	G	Games coached	W	Games won	L	Games lost	W–L %	Win–loss %
Playoffs	PG	Playoff games	PW	Playoff wins	PL	Playoff losses	PW–L %	Playoff win–loss %

Team	Year	G	W	L	W–L%	Finish	PG	PW	PL	PW–L%	Result
Saitama Broncos	2005–06	40	7	33	.175	6th	-	-	-	–	-
Toyama Grouses	2009–10	52	17	35	.327	6th in Eastern	-	-	-	–	-
