= Tadashi Hayashi =

Japanese basketball coach

Personal information
- Born: June 29, 1962 (age 64) Osaka Prefecture

Career information
- College: Daito Bunka University
- Position: Head coach

Career history

Coaching
- 1987-1990: Sekisui Chemiclas (asst.)
- 1990-2002: Swish
- 2003-2005: Kansai University
- 2007-2010: Akashi Shimizu HS
- 2010-2012: Tokuyama University
- 2012: Gunma Crane Thunders

Tadashi Hayashi (林 正, Hayashi Tadashi) is the former Head coach of the Gunma Crane Thunders in the Japanese Bj League.

== Head coaching record ==
Legend
Regular season	G	Games coached	W	Games won	L	Games lost	W–L %	Win–loss %
Playoffs	PG	Playoff games	PW	Playoff wins	PL	Playoff losses	PW–L %	Playoff win–loss %

Team	Year	G	W	L	W–L%	Finish	PG	PW	PL	PW–L%	Result
Gunma Crane Thunders	2012	8	0	8	.000	Fired	-	-	-	–	-
