= Toyama City Gymnasium =

Indoor sporting arena in Toyama, Japan

Coordinates: 36.706572°N 137.214481°E

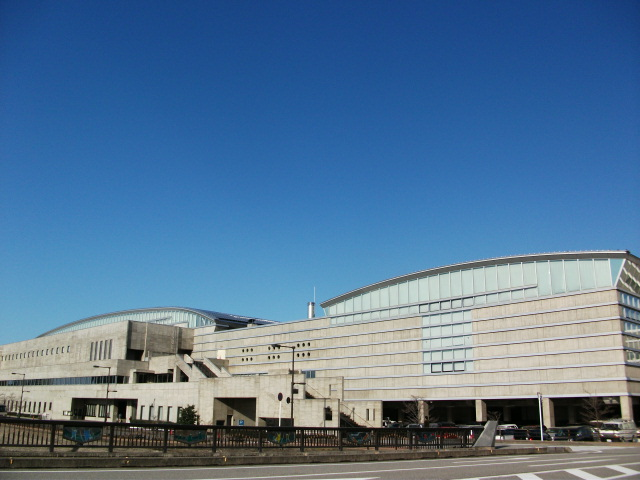
- Interactive map of Toyama City Gymnasium
- Full name: Toyama City General Gymnasium
- Location: Toyama, Toyama, Japan
- Owner: Toyama city
- Capacity: 4,650
- Scoreboard: Daktronics centerhung scoreboard
- Parking: 274 spaces

Construction
- Groundbreaking: December 1996
- Opened: June 1999
- Cost: JPY16.81 billion
- Architect: Yamashita Sekkei
- Main contractor: Maeda Corporation

Tenants
- Toyama Grouses; Prestige International Aranmare Toyama

Website
- Official website

Toyama City Gymnasium is an indoor sporting arena located in Toyama, Japan. The capacity of the arena is 5,000 people. It hosted some of the group games for the 2003 FIVB Volleyball Men's World Cup.

== Facilities ==
- No. 1 arena - 57.6m×44m 2,534m^{2}
- No. 2 arena - 38.5m×30m 1,155m^{2}
- Gymnastics hall - 800m^{2}
- Archery field - 470m^{2}
- Boxing room - 127m^{2}
- Table tennis room
- Running course

== Events ==
- Tokyo Girls Collection - July 2018

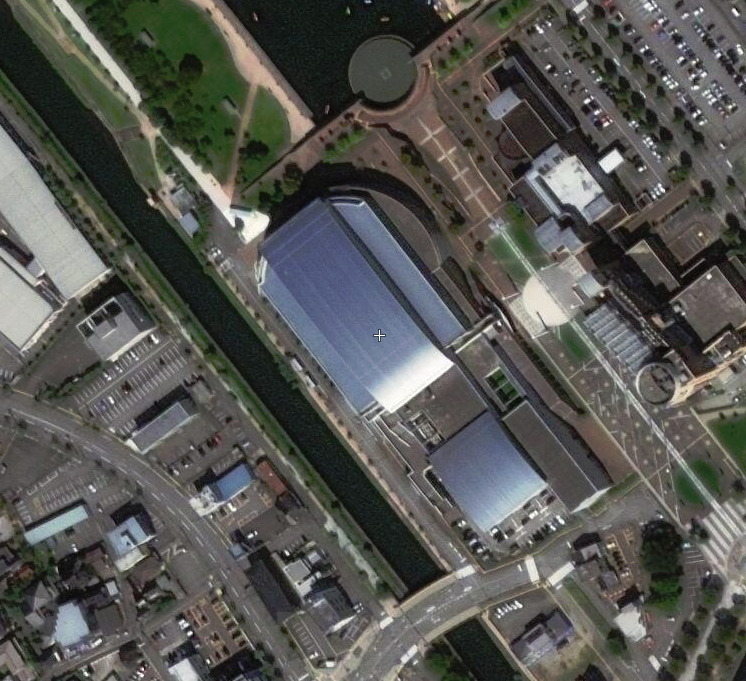
Satellite view
