= Kenji Yamane =

Japanese basketball coach

Nagoya Gakuin University
- Position: Assistant coach

Personal information
- Born: October 11, 1967 (age 59) Hokkaido

Career information
- High school: Tokai University Daiyon (Sapporo, Hokkaido)
- College: Tokai University
- Playing career: 1989–2000

Career history

Playing
- 1989-2000: Mazda/Ẽfini Tokyo/Tokorozawa

Coaching
- 2006-2007: Saitama Broncos
- 2015-present: Nagoya Gakuin University (asst)

Career highlights

Kenji Yamane (山根謙二, Yamane Kenji) is the former Head coach of the Saitama Broncos in the Japanese Bj League.

== Head coaching record ==
Legend
Regular season	G	Games coached	W	Games won	L	Games lost	W–L %	Win–loss %
Playoffs	PG	Playoff games	PW	Playoff wins	PL	Playoff losses	PW–L %	Playoff win–loss %

Team	Year	G	W	L	W–L%	Finish	PG	PW	PL	PW–L%	Result
Saitama Broncos	2006-07	40	15	25	.375	6th in Bj	-	-	-	–	-
