= Toyama Prefectural General Sports Center =

Sports venue in Toyama, Japan

Coordinates: 36°38′38″N 137°11′26.8″E

- Sports Palace; Kenso
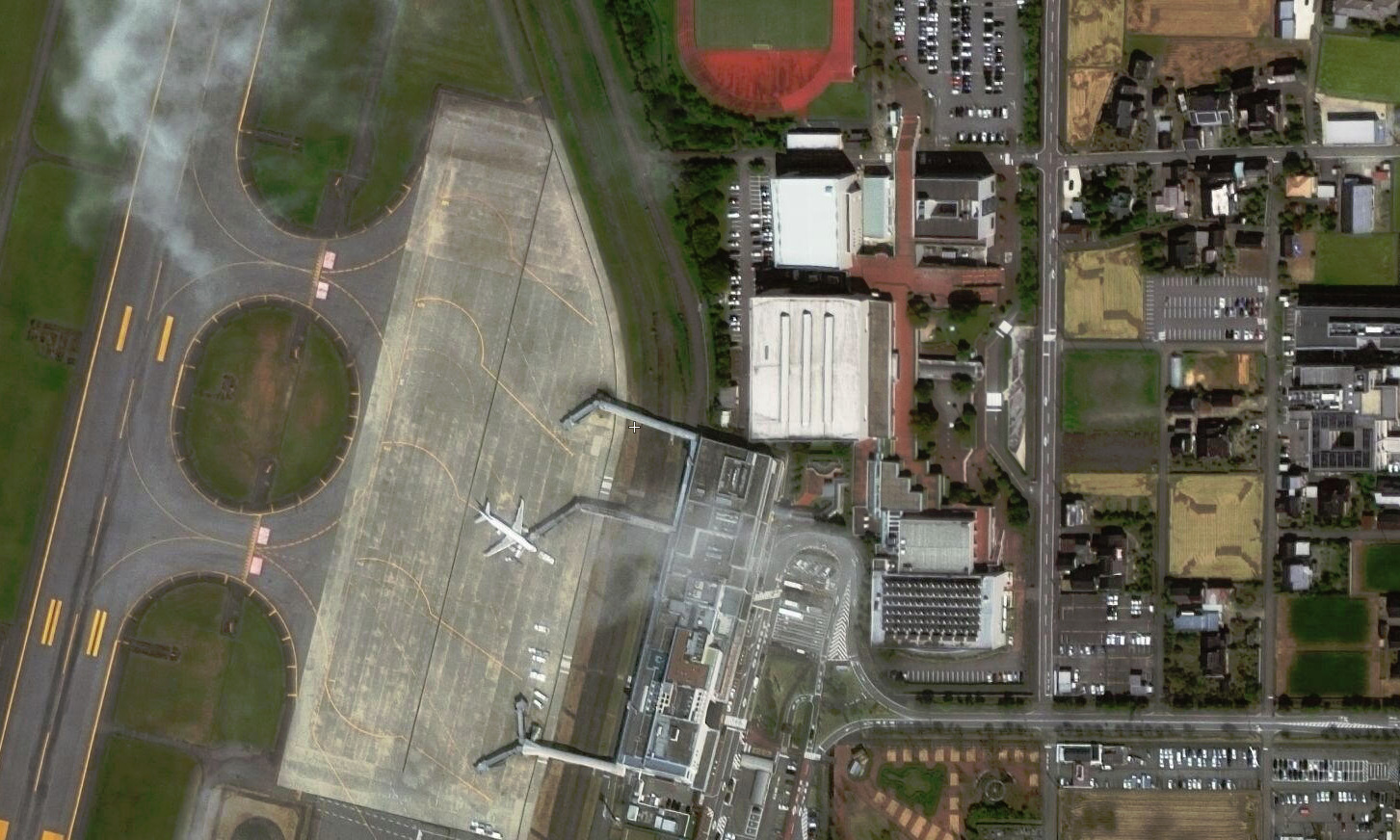
- Interactive map of Toyama Prefectural General Sports Center
- Full name: Toyama Prefectural General Sports Center
- Location: Toyama, Toyama, Japan
- Owner: Toyama Prefecture
- Operator: Toyama Prefecture
- Capacity: Large arena:3,024
- Parking: 500

Construction
- Opened: June 1984
- Cost

Toyama Prefectural General Sports Center is an arena in Toyama, Toyama, Japan. It is adjacent to Toyama Airport.

== Facilities ==
- Large arena 50m×36m
- Medium arena 45m×30m
- Swimming pool 50m 8 courses
- Diving pool
