= Tatsunori Fujie =

Japanese basketball player (born 1987)

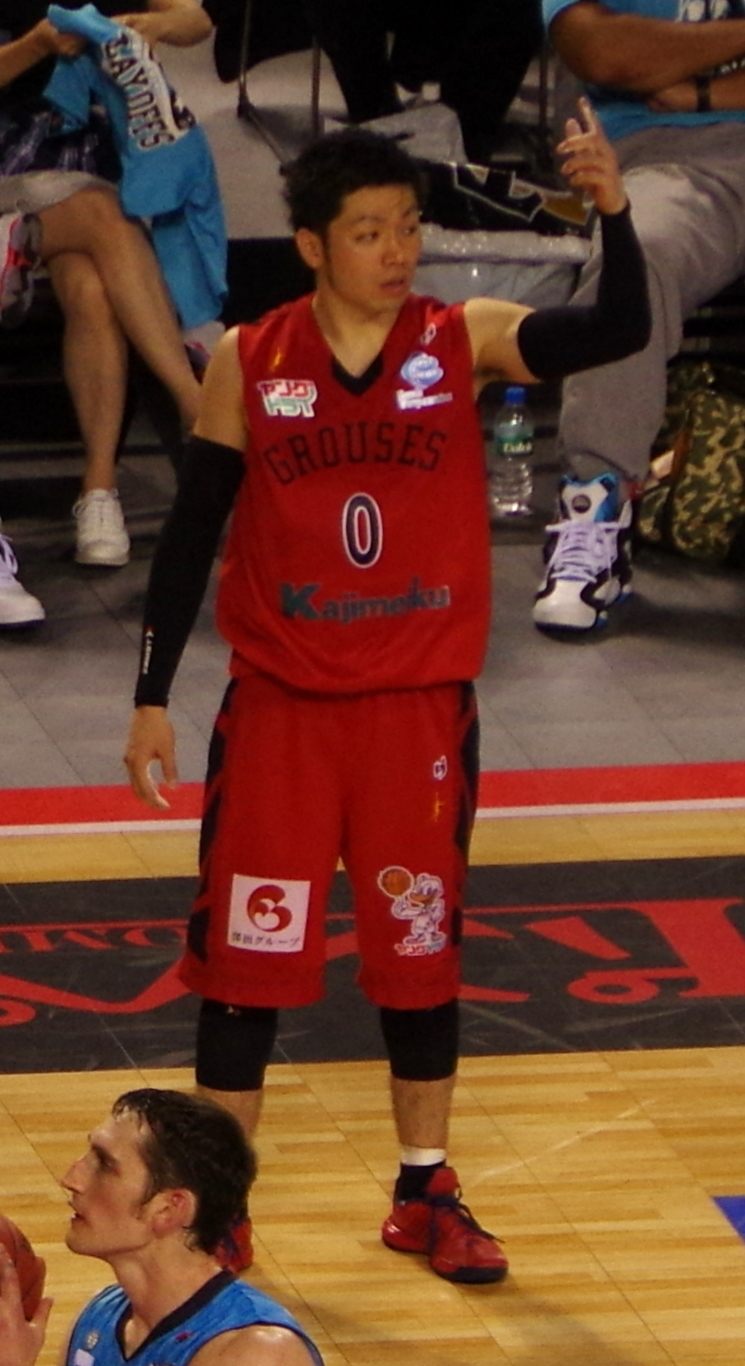

Personal information
- Born: May 5, 1987 (age 39) Fukuoka, Fukuoka, Japan
- Listed height: 6 ft 1 in (1.85 m)
- Listed weight: 190 lb (86 kg)

Career information
- High school: Fukuoka Daiichi (Fukuoka, Japan)
- College: Kyushu Sangyo University (2006); Hakuoh University(2007-2010)
- Playing career: 2010–2020
- Position: Guard / forward

Career history
- 2010–2012: TGI D-Rise
- 2012–2015: Toyama Grouses
- 2015–2016: Iwate Big Bulls
- 2016–2017: Akita Northern Happinets
- 2017–2020: Iwate Big Bulls

Tatsunori Fujie (藤江 建典, Fujie Tatsunori; born May 5, 1987) is a Japanese former professional basketball player who last played for the Iwate Big Bulls of the B.League in Japan. He was selected by the Toyama Grouses with the 4th overall pick in the 2012 bj League draft. On August 16, 2016, Fujie signed with the Akita Happinets.

== Career statistics ==
Legend
GP	Games played	GS	Games started	MPG	Minutes per game
FG%	Field goal percentage	3P%	3-point field goal percentage	FT%	Free throw percentage
RPG	Rebounds per game	APG	Assists per game	SPG	Steals per game
BPG	Blocks per game	PPG	Points per game	**Bold**	Career high

=== Regular season ===
Year	Team	GP	GS	MPG	FG%	3P%	FT%	RPG	APG	SPG	BPG	PPG
2011-12	TGI	27	27	32.4	35.8	29.1	76.4	2.5	2.0	0.3	0	13.04
2012-13	Toyama	48	6	20.1	29.4	29.5	76.5	1.0	1.3	0.6	0.1	6.7
2013-14	Toyama	48	46	29.3	32.7	28.7	73.1	1.4	2.2	0.6	0.0	9.9
2014-15	Toyama	50	50	32.2	34.5	25.0	66.4	1.3	3.8	0.5	0.1	10.0
2015-16	Iwate	52	33	25.8	39.1	30.4	69.1	1.9	2.2	0.8	0.0	11.7
2016-17	Akita	40	3	7.5	28.6	13.3	76.5	0.5	0.5	0.2	0.0	1.5
2017-18	Iwate	59	35	22.8	35.0	23.9	67.8	1.5	2.9	0.6	0.0	5.9
2018-19	Iwate	60	59	28.6	38.6	27.1	72.2	2.6	3.7	0.6	0.1	10.9
2019-20	Iwate	28	1	13.6	38.0	38.9	69.2	0.9	1.1	0.2	0.0	3.8

=== Playoffs ===
Year	Team	GP	GS	MPG	FG%	3P%	FT%	RPG	APG	SPG	BPG	PPG
2016-17	Akita	3	1		.200	.000	.000	1.0	2.33	0.33	0	0.7

== Trivia ==
- He wanted to become a Japan Self-Defense Forces soldier.
- He likes Harami meat, and music of Kana Nishino.
