= Kazuaki Shimoji =

Japanese basketball player and coach

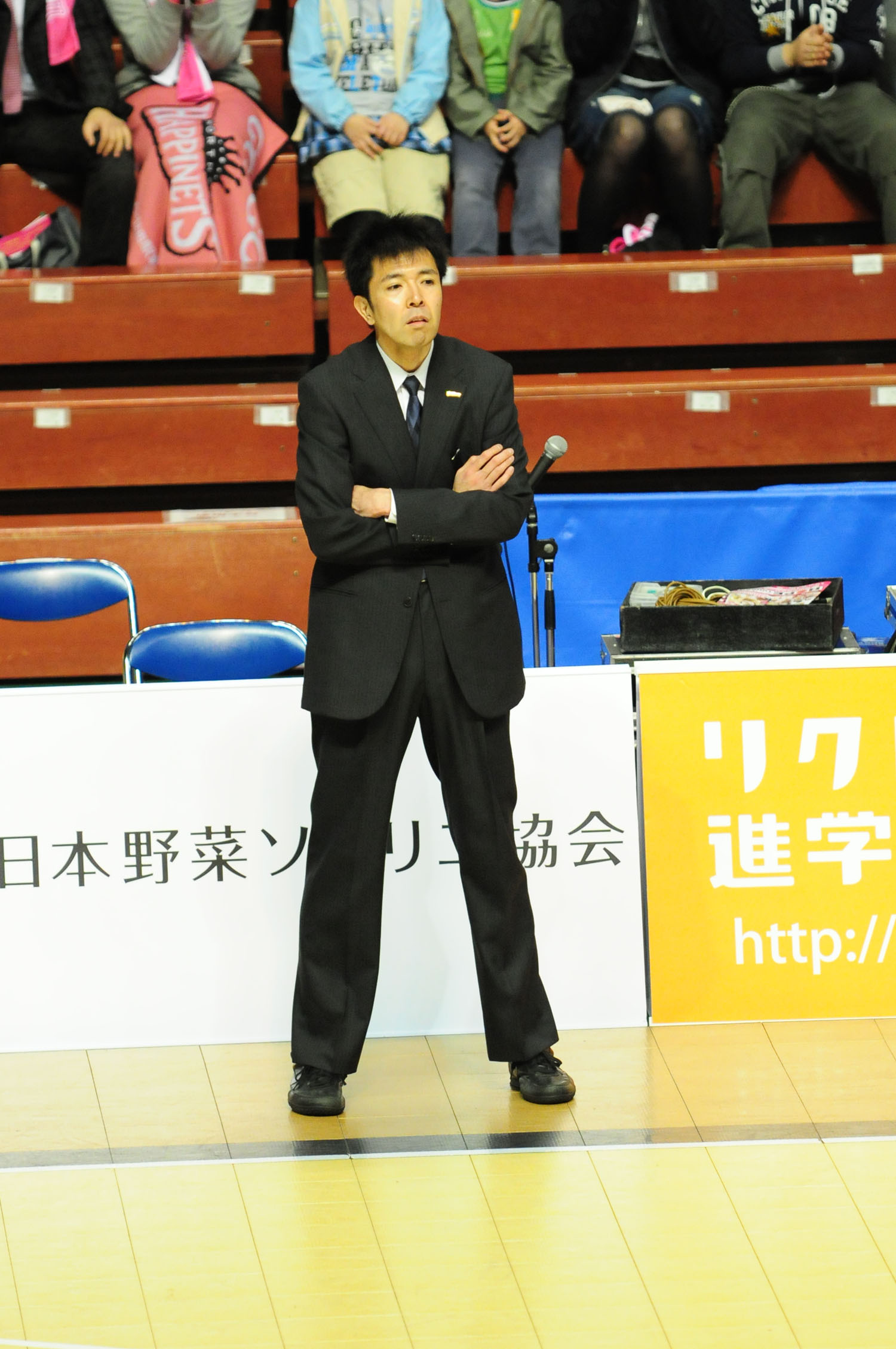

Personal information
- Born: December 4, 1976 (age 49) Okinawa Prefecture
- Listed height: 195 cm (6 ft 5 in)
- Listed weight: 84 kg (185 lb)

Career information
- High school: Chatan (Chatan, Okinawa)
- College: Chuo University
- Playing career: 2001–2001
- Position: Head coach

Career history

Playing
- 2001: OSG Phoenix

Coaching
- 2001-2002: OSG Phoenix (asst)
- 2003: Japan (asst)
- 2004-2009: Niigata Albirex BB junior
- 2006-2009: Niigata Albirex BB (asst)
- 2011-2012: Toyama Grouses
- 2014-2015: Saitama Broncos
- 2017: Toyama Grouses (asst)

Career highlights

Kazuaki Shimoji (下地一明, Shimoji Kazuaki) is the former Head coach of the Toyama Grouses in the Japanese Bj League.

== Head coaching record ==
Legend
Regular season	G	Games coached	W	Games won	L	Games lost	W–L %	Win–loss %
Playoffs	PG	Playoff games	PW	Playoff wins	PL	Playoff losses	PW–L %	Playoff win–loss %

Team	Year	G	W	L	W–L%	Finish	PG	PW	PL	PW–L%	Result
Toyama Grouses	2011	18	5	13	.278	7th in Eastern	2	0	2	.000	Lost in 1st round
Toyama Grouses	2011-12	52	25	27	.481	5th in Eastern	2	0	2	.000	Lost in 1st round
Saitama Broncos	2014-15	52	6	46	.115	11th in Eastern	-	-	-	–	-
