= Saitama Broncos =

- Division: Third
- Leagues: B.League
- Founded: 1982
- History: ME Tokorozawa Broncos (1996–1998); Tokorozawa Broncos (1998–2000); Saitama Broncos (2000–present)
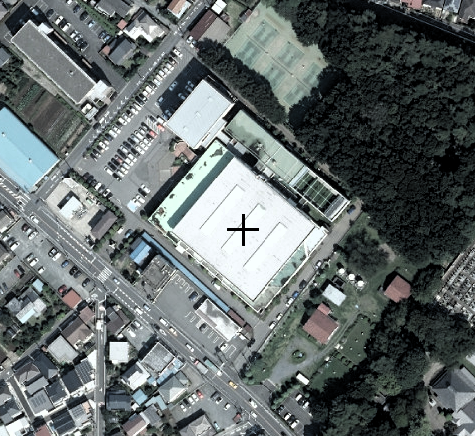
- Arena: Urawa Komaba Gymnasium (capacity:1,374 )
- Location: Saitama
- Team colors: Red and Black
- President: Toshihiko Narita
- Head coach: Shugaku Izumi
- Ownership: Jun Ikeda
- Championships: 2
- Website: broncos20.jp
Home	Away

The Saitama Broncos (さいたまブロンコス, Saitama Buronkosu) are a Japanese professional basketball team based in Saitama. The team most recently competed in the third division of the B.League. Starting from the 2026–27 season, the team will compete in the B.League One, the league's second division, as a member of the Eastern Conference. The team plays their home games at Urawa Komaba Gymnasium, Tokorozawa Municipal Gymnasium, and Fukaya City General Gymnasium.

== History ==
- 1982: founded as an amateur Mazda Auto Tokyo (マツダオート東京, Matsuda Ōto Tōkyō; a dealer of Mazda Motor) basketball club.
- 1983: The nickname Broncos taken from Santa Clara University.
- 1987: Promoted to Japan Basketball League division 1.
- 1991: Club renamed to "Ẽfini Tokyo" (アンフィニ東京, Anfini Tōkyō)
- 1996: The company club was dissolved.
- 1997: Restarts as a community-based club "ME Tokorozawa Broncos" (ME所沢ブロンコス, Emu-ī Tokorozawa Buronkos). From a lower-tier "Kantō Corporate League" (関東実業団リーグ, Kantō Zitsugyō-dan Rīgu).
- 1998: Renamed "Tokorozawa Broncos" (所沢ブロンコス, Tokorozawa Buronkos). Promoted to the JBL division 2.
- 1999: The league reorganisation put the team to the new JBL.
- 2000: Adds Saitama City to its hometowns. Renamed hiragana "Saitama Broncos" (さいたまブロンコス, Saitama Buronkosu).
- 2002-03, 2004-05: Wins the premiership in two-peat.
- 2005: Quits the JBL. Renamed kanji "Saitama Broncos" (埼玉ブロンコス, Saitama Buronkosu). Competes in the bj league as an inaugural member.

== Roster ==
Saitama Broncos roster
Players
Coaches

Pos.	No.	Nat.	Name
PF	0	(United States)	Grant Sitton
PG	1	(Japan)	Reo Yamazaki
PF	2	(Japan)	Will Creekmore
PG	3	(Japan)	Taketo Kato
G	4	(Japan)	Tomoya Hata
C	6	(United States)	Ryan Watkins
PF	8	(Japan)	Takashi Igarashi
PG	11	(Japan)	Hikaru Akiyama
SG	14	(Japan)	Fumiya Sato
PF	18	(United States)	Maxie Esho
SG	21	(Japan)	Akihisa Nohara
SF	28	(Japan)	Ryohei Kawabe
G/F	30	(Japan)	Ryutaro Noguchi
PG	32	(Japan)	Masahiro Okamoto
PG	35	(Japan)	Beni Mpaka Misakabo
PG	44	(Japan)	Aiki Tanno

Head coach

Shugaku Izumi

Legend

- (C) Team captain
- Injured

- Roster
Updated: 31 March 2023

== Notable players ==
To appear in this section a player must have either:

- Set a club record or won an individual award as a professional player.
- Played at least one official international match for his senior national team or one NBA game at any time.
- (Japan) Ryuzo Anzai
- (United States) David Benoit
- (United States) Paul Butorac
- (United States) Andrew Feeley
- (United States) Anwar Ferguson
- (United States) John Humphrey
- (Japan) Shusei Ishii
- (Japan) Reina Itakura
- (United States) Michael Joiner
- (United States) Paul Afeaki Khoury
- (Japan) Yūki Kitamuki (fr)
- (United States) George Leach
- (United States) Terrence Roberts
- (Japan) Yuki Sasaki
- (United States) Kenny Satterfield
- (Japan) Kazuhiro Shoji
- (United States) Seth Tarver
- (Senegal) Ibrahima Thomas
- (United States) Tiras Wade
- (Saint Vincent and the Grenadines) Nyika Williams
- (United States) Terrence Woodyard

== Coaches ==
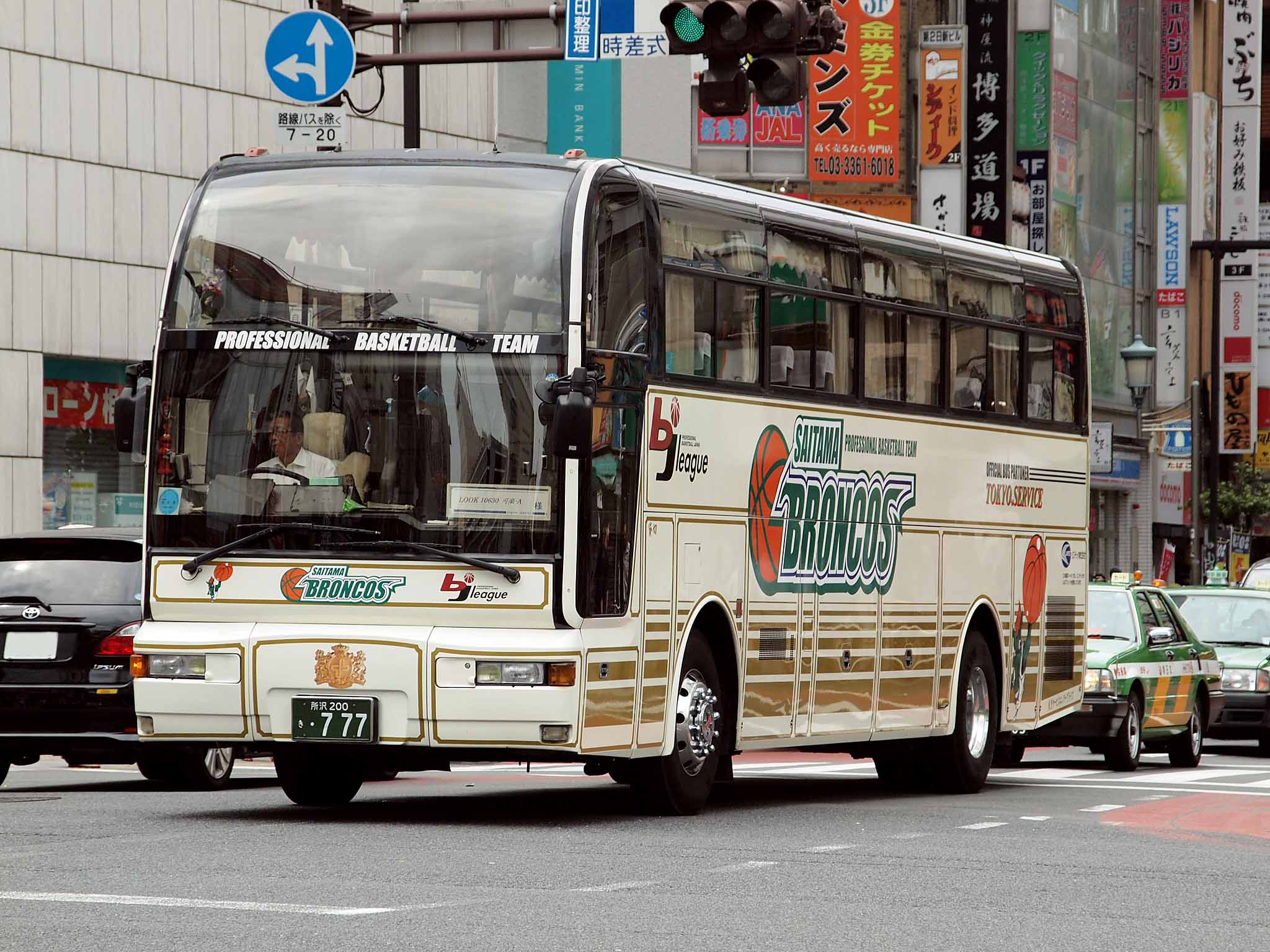
Broncos bus

- Tomoya Higashino
- Charles Johnson
- Kenji Yamane
- David Benoit
- Masato Fukushima
- Bob Nash
- Dean Murray
- Natalie Nakase
- Tracy Williams
- Takatoshi Ishibashi
- Kazuaki Shimoji
- Ryutaro Onodera
- Collier St. Clair
- Thomas Roijakkers
- John Saintignon

== Arenas ==
Former logo

- Urawa Komaba Gymnasium
- Tokorozawa Municipal Gymnasium
- Josai University
- Fukaya Big Turtle
- Kasukabe City General Gymnasium
- Cosmos Arena Fukiage
- Shiki Citizens Gymnasium
