= Naoki Uto =

Japanese basketball player

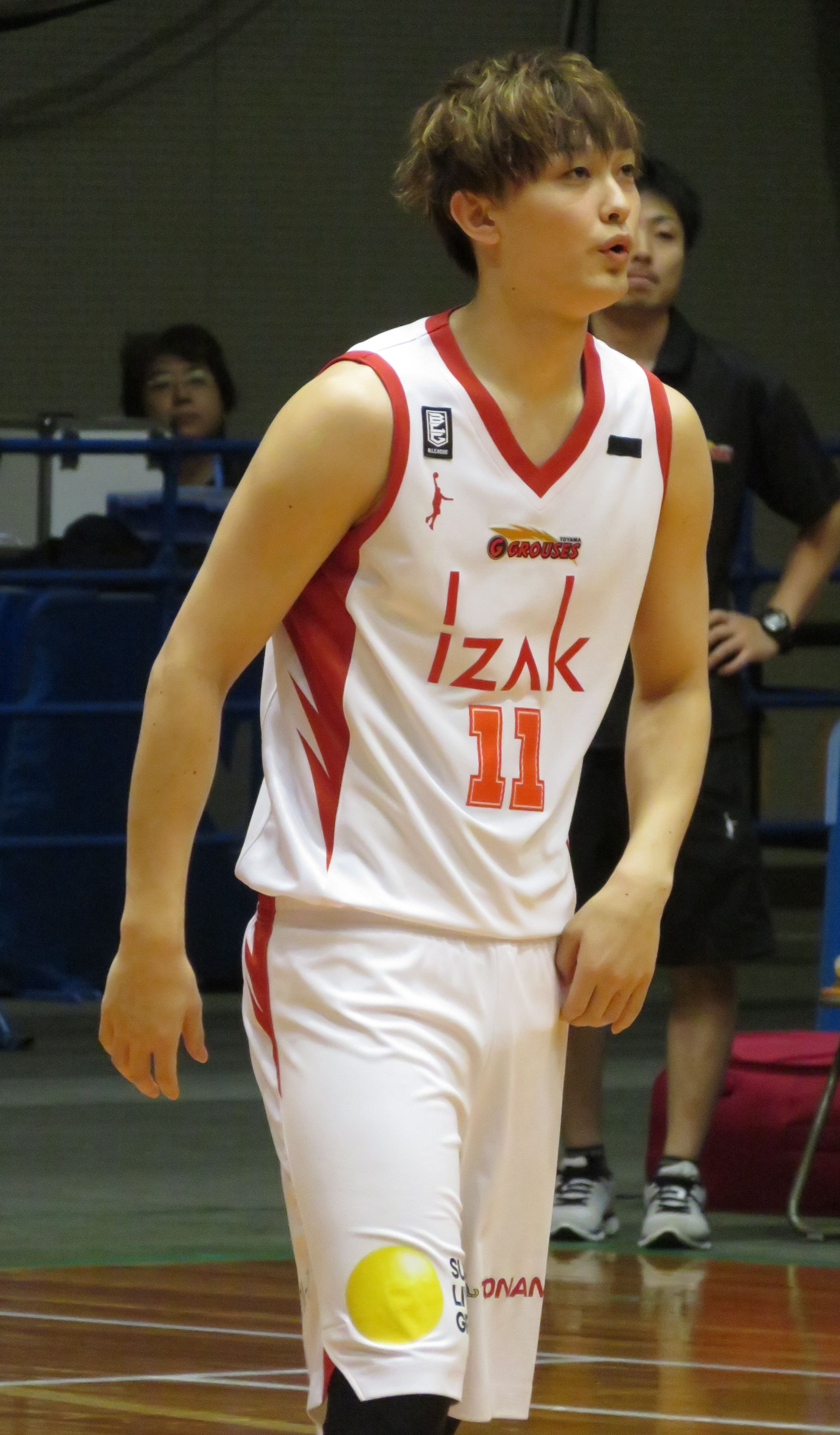

No. 11 – Toyama Grouses
- Position: Point guard
- League: B.League

Personal information
- Born: June 11, 1991 (age 35) Nagoya, Aichi
- Listed height: 6 ft 3 in (1.91 m)
- Listed weight: 176 lb (80 kg)

Career information
- High school: Chubu University Daiichi High (Nisshin, Aichi)
- College: Senshu University
- Playing career: 2014–present

Career history
- 2014–2016: Toyota Alvark
- 2016–2022: Toyama Grouses
- 2022-2023: Bambitious Nara
- 2023-: Toyama Grouses

Career highlights
- 2x B.League Assist leader

Naoki Uto (宇都直輝, Uto Naoki; born June 11, 1991) is a Japanese professional basketball player for the Toyama Grouses of the B.League in Japan.

== Career statistics ==
Legend
GP	Games played	GS	Games started	MPG	Minutes per game
FG%	Field goal percentage	3P%	3-point field goal percentage	FT%	Free throw percentage
RPG	Rebounds per game	APG	Assists per game	SPG	Steals per game
BPG	Blocks per game	PPG	Points per game	**Bold**	Career high

*	Led the league

Year	Team	GP	GS	MPG	FG%	3P%	FT%	RPG	APG	SPG	BPG	PPG
2013-14	Toyota	12		8.5	.414	.000	.526	0.7	1.5	0.3	0.1	2.8
2014-15	Toyota	47	1	14.8	.363	.000	.706	1.2	1.9	0.4	0.1	3.8
2015-16	Toyota	55	3	15.7	.422	.333	.698	1.4	1.9	0.4	0.1	3.4
2016-17	Toyama	60	47	29.6	.416	.290	.763	4.0	4.2*	1.2	0.2	9.4
2017-18	Toyama	59	58	34.5	.453	.222	.787	4.7	7.7*	1.2	0.1	17.0
