= Emanuel Herold =

German politician (born 1986)

Member of the Bürgerschaft of Bremen
- Incumbent
- Assumed office 8 June 2023

Personal details
- Born: 28 December 1986 (age 39)
- Party: Alliance 90/The Greens (since 2018)

Emanuel Herold (born 28 December 1986) is a German politician serving as a member of the Bürgerschaft of Bremen since 2023. He has served as group leader of Alliance 90/The Greens since 2025.
