= Gunma Crane Thunders =

Professional basketball team in Ota, Gunma Prefecture, Japan

- Conference: East
- Division: 1st
- Leagues: B.League
- Founded: 2011
- Arena: Open House Arena Ota
- Capacity: 5,000
- Location: Ota, Gunma
- President: Masaaki Arai
- Head coach: Kyle Milling
- Ownership: Open House
- Website: g-crane-thunders.jp
Home	Away

The Gunma Crane Thunders are a Japanese professional basketball team based in Ōta, Gunma Prefecture. The team competes in the B.League Premier, the highest division of the B.League, as a member of the Eastern Conference. The team plays its home games at Open House Arena Ota.

It is said that the shape of Gunma Prefecture resembles the shape of a dancing crane. The team's name is a combination of the crane and thunder, which evokes images of "energy" and "speed".

== Coaches ==
- Tadashi Hayashi (2012)
- Ryan Blackwell (2012–13)
- Hiroki Fujita (2013
- Charlie Parker (2014–15)
- Hirokazu Nema (2015–16)
- Fujitaka Hiraoka (2016–21)
- Thomas Wisman (2021–22)
- Kota Mizuno (2022–2024)
- Kyle Milling (2024–present)

== Roster ==
Gunma Crane Thunders roster
Players
Coaches

Pos.	No.	Nat.	Name	Ht.	Age
G	0	(Japan)	Yuma Fujii	1.78 m (5 ft 10 in)	34 – 23 December 1991
G	1	(Japan)	Koh Flippin	1.88 m (6 ft 2 in)	30 – 20 May 1996
F	3	(Japan)	Michael Parker	2.00 m (6 ft 7 in)	44 – 5 December 1981
G	4	(United States)	Trey McKinney-Jones	1.96 m (6 ft 5 in)	35 – 27 August 1990
F	8	(Japan)	Allen Hachimura	1.98 m (6 ft 6 in)	26 – 20 December 1999
G	9	(Japan)	Naoto Tsuji	1.85 m (6 ft 1 in)	36 – 8 September 1989
F	11	(Japan)	Kengo Nomoto (C)	2.01 m (6 ft 7 in)	34 – 25 April 1992
G	12	(Japan)	Keigo Kimura	1.88 m (6 ft 2 in)	25 – 8 November 2000
G	14	(Japan)	Teru Sugawara	1.83 m (6 ft 0 in)	28 – 27 May 1998
F	16	(Japan)	Kenny Asano	1.98 m (6 ft 6 in)	23 – 16 August 2002
C	25	(United States)	Kaleb Tarczewski	2.13 m (7 ft 0 in)	33 – 26 February 1993
G	29	(Japan)	Kazuki Hosokawa	1.87 m (6 ft 2 in)	28 – 17 November 1997
F/C	32	(Germany)	Johannes Thiemann	2.05 m (6 ft 9 in)	32 – 9 February 1994

Head coach

(United States) Kyle Milling

Assistant coach(es)

(Japan) Taketo Aoki
(Japan) Ryoichi Nishitani

Legend

- (C) Team captain
- Injured

- Roster
Updated: 19 April 2025

== Notable players ==
Former logo

- (Czech Republic) Ondrej Balvin
- (Ghana) Ben Bentil
- (United States) Trey Britton
- (Lithuania) Deividas Busma
- (United States) Marcus Cousin
- (Serbia) Darko Čohadarević
- (United States) Melvin Ely
- (Japan) Hamilton Gary Kotera
- (Japan) Thomas Kennedy
- (Nigeria) Abdullahi Kuso
- (Finland) Erik Murphy
- (United States) Scootie Randall
- (United States) Kenneth Simms
- (United States) Dillion Sneed
- (United States) Ryan Stephan
- (Japan) Noriyuki Sugasawa
- (United States) Patrick Sullivan
- (Japan) Hirohisa Takada
- (Germany) Johannes Thiemann

== Arenas ==
- Ota Citizens Gymnasium
- Yamato Citizens Gymnasium Maebashi
- Yamada Green Dome Maebashi
- Kiryu University Green Arena
- Kakinuma Arena
- Isesaki Citizens Gymnasium
