= Toyama Grouses =

Professional basketball team in Toyama, Japan

- Conference: Western
- Division: First
- Leagues: B.League
- Founded: 2005; 21 years ago
- Arena: Toyama City Gymnasium
- Capacity: 4,650
- Location: Toyama, Toyama
- Main sponsor: Izak
- Championships: none
- Conference titles: Eastern Conference Champions (2016)
- Website: grouses.jp
Home	Away

The Toyama Grouses (富山グラウジーズ, Toyama Guraujīzu) are a Japanese professional basketball team based in Toyama. The team competes in the B.League Premier, the highest division of the B.League, as a member of the Eastern Conference. The team plays its home games at Toyama City Gymnasium.

== Head coaches ==
- Masato Fukushima
- Takatoshi Ishibashi
- Charles Johnson (2009–10)
- Kohei Eto
- Kazuaki Shimoji
- Bob Nash (2012–17)
- Miodrag Rajković (2017–18)
- Don Beck
- Honoo Hamaguchi

== Roster ==
Toyama Grouses roster
Players
Coaches

Pos.	No.	Nat.	Name	Ht.	Age
G	3	(Japan)	Yoshiyuki Nozaki	1.83 m (6 ft 0 in)	26 – 8 February 2000
F	4	(Japan)	Troy Murphy Jr.	1.95 m (6 ft 5 in)	23 – 12 November 2002
G	9	(Japan)	Takeshi Mito	1.85 m (6 ft 1 in)	41 – 23 April 1985
G	10	(Japan)	Shuto Kishinaga	1.81 m (5 ft 11 in)	26 – 11 August 2000
G	11	(Japan)	Naoki Uto	1.91 m (6 ft 3 in)	35 – 11 June 1991
F/C	15	(Philippines)	AJ Edu	2.08 m (6 ft 10 in)	26 – 1 January 2000
G	16	(Japan)	Takashi Ito	1.74 m (5 ft 9 in)	36 – 14 February 1990
F	20	(Japan)	Shunsuke Ueda	1.88 m (6 ft 2 in)	26 – 18 September 1999
F	23	(United States)	Novar Gadson	2.01 m (6 ft 7 in)	36 – 17 December 1989
G/F	24	(Japan)	Koyo Takahashi	1.92 m (6 ft 4 in)	32 – 16 June 1994
PF	25	(United States)	Aamir Simms	1.99 m (6 ft 6 in)	26 – 17 September 1999
G/F	44	(Japan)	Eo Java Yoneyama	1.90 m (6 ft 3 in)	24 – 29 January 2002
G	71	(Japan)	Hiroki Higashi	1.84 m (6 ft 0 in)	31 – 24 June 1995

Head coach

Honoo Hamaguchi

Assistant coach(es)

Daisuke Takaoka
Koki Yabuuchi

Legend

- (C) Team captain
- Injured

- Roster
Updated: 7 April 2023

== Notable players ==
Former logo

- Uka Agbai
- Earl Barron
- Jamar Brown
- Ira Brown
- Dwight Ramos
- Babacar Camara
- Brandon Cole
- Tatsunori Fujie
- Ángel García
- Brock Gillespie
- Josh Gross
- Takatoshi Ishibashi
- Nate James
- Masashi Joho
- Makoto Kato (fr)
- Yuto Otsuka
- Dexter Pittman
- Clint Chapman
- Devin Searcy
- Djibril Thiam
- Larry Turner
- Drew Viney
- Jerod Ward
- Sam Willard
- Terrence Woodyard

== Arenas ==
- Toyama City Gymnasium
- Toyama Prefectural General Sports Center
- Toyama Seibu Sports Center
