= Yamagata Wyverns =

- Conference: East
- Division: Second
- Leagues: B.League
- Founded: 2009
- History: TGI D-Rise (2009–2013); Yamagata Wyverns (2013–present)
- Arena: Yamagata Prefectural General Sports Park Gymnasium
- Capacity: 3,976
- Location: Tendo, Yamagata
- Main sponsor: Vegasvegas Pachinko
- President: (Japan) Kazufumi Yoshimura
- Head coach: Miodrag Rajković
- Championships: none
- Website: wyverns.jp
Home	Away

The Yamagata Wyverns are a Japanese professional basketball team based in Tendō, Yamagata Prefecture. The team competes in the B.League One, the second division of the B.League, as a member of the Northern Conference. The team was originally known as TGI D-Rise and served as a development team of the Link Tochigi Brex. TGI stands for Tochigi, Gunma and Ibaraki, three northern Kanto prefectures.

== Roster ==
Yamagata Wyverns roster
Players
Coaches

Pos.	No.	Nat.	Name
G	0	(Japan)	Tomoya Yamada
SF	3	(United States)	James Bell
G/F	5	(Japan)	Ryunosuke Yanagawa
PF	10	(Japan)	Kohei Takahashi
SF	11	(Japan)	Hiromu Terasawa
PF	17	(Japan)	Yusuke Suzuki
PG	21	(Japan)	Takanori Tahara
G	23	(Japan)	Shunto Murakami
G	24	(Japan)	Dai Suzuki
SF	27	(Japan)	Josei Maniwa (C)
F/C	32	(Panama)	Javier Carter
PG	33	(Japan)	Yoshiki Ishii
C	40	(United States)	Thomas Welsh
SG	95	(Japan)	Rui Saito

Head coach

Miodrag Rajković

Assistant coach(es)

Yuta Ryan Koseki

Legend

- (C) Team captain
- Injured

- Roster
Updated: March 26, 2023

== Notable players ==
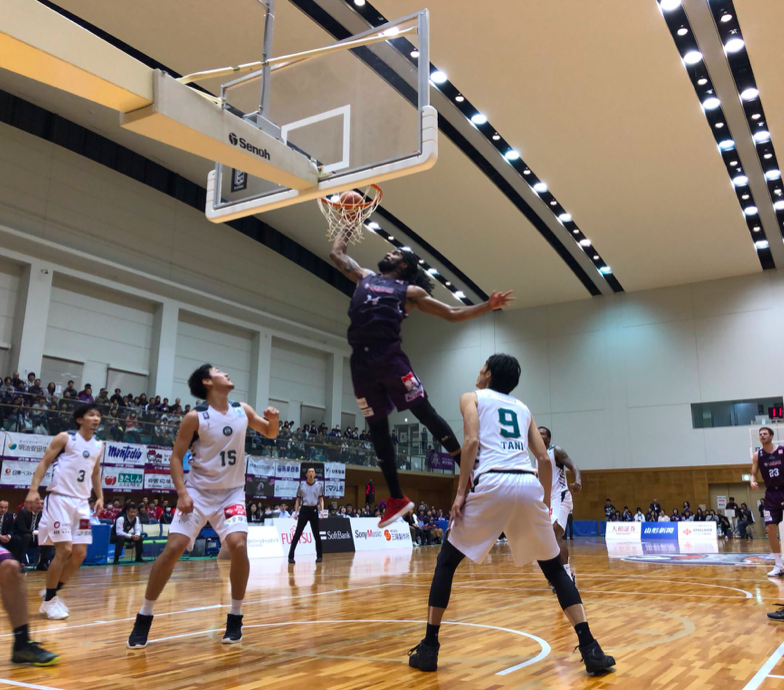
Chu scoring at the Nanyo Citizens Gymnasium

- Will Creekmore
- Anthony Elechi
- Torian Graham
- Gary Hamilton
- Stephen Hurt
- Billy Knight
- Chukwudiebere Maduabum
- Billy McShepard
- Yoshifumi Nakajima
- Justin Reynolds
- Magnum Rolle
- Seth Tarver
- Shusuke Yamamoto

=== TGI D-Rise players ===
- Paul Butorac
- Tatsunori Fujie
- Masashi Hosoya
- Yuto Otsuka
- Lamar Rice
- Noriyuki Sugasawa

== Coaches ==
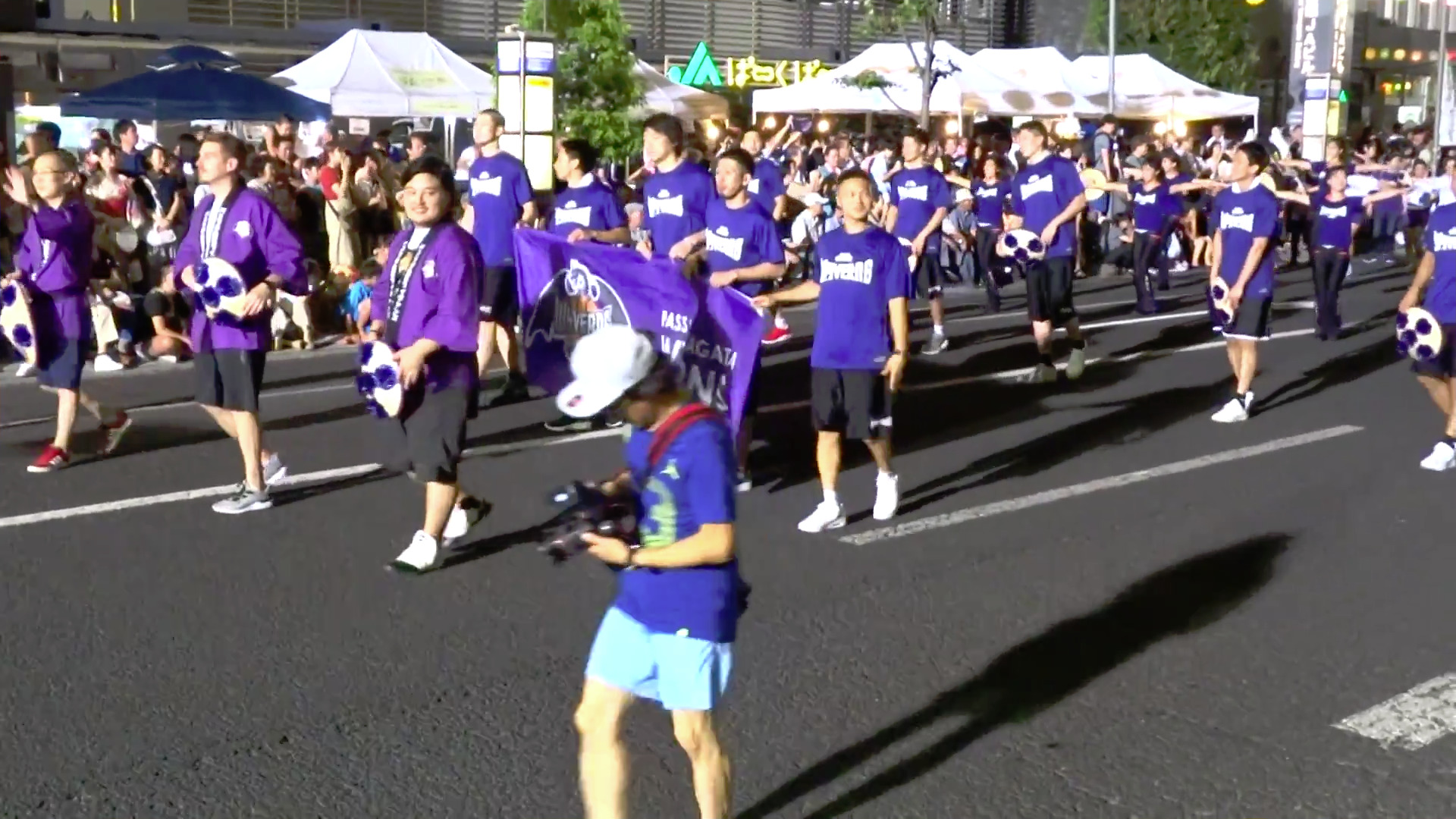
Yamagata Wyverns at Hanagasa matsuri

- Atsushi Kanazawa
- Koju Munakata
- Joe Cook
- Yuta Ryan Koseki [tl]
- Ryutaro Onodera
- Ryuji Kawai
- Sho Higashijima
- Miodrag Rajković

== Arenas ==
- Yamagata Prefectural General Sports Park Gymnasium
- Yamagata City General Sports Center

== Practice facilities ==
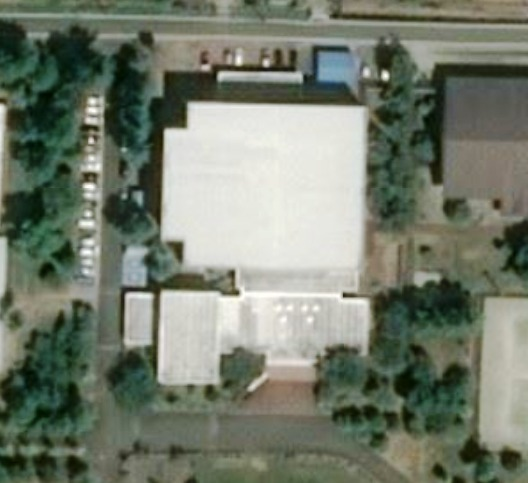
Yamanobe Citizens General Gymnasium

- Yamanobe Citizens General Gymnasium
