= Justin Herold =

American basketball player (born 1991)

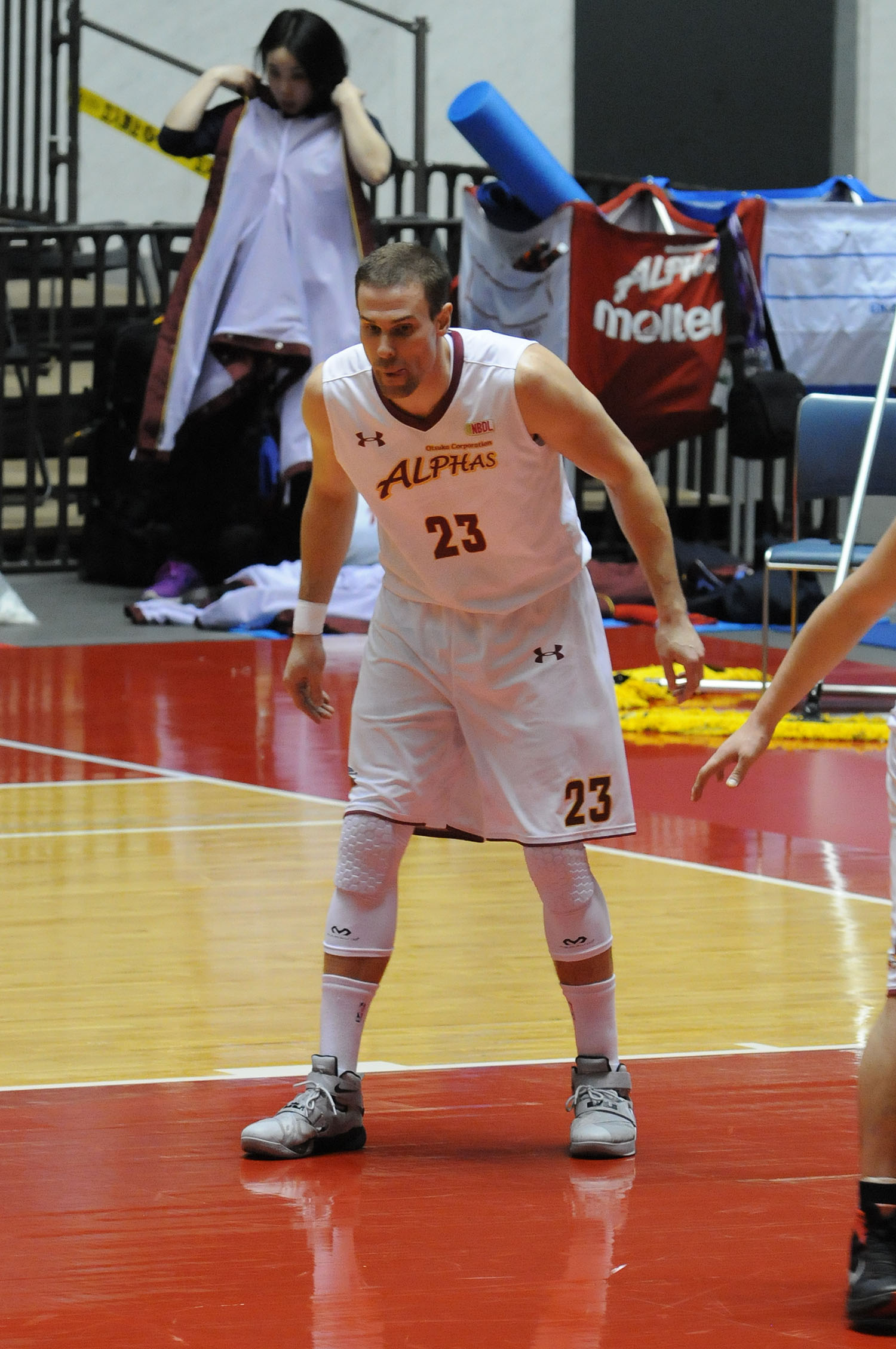
- Justin Herold, 2016.

Free agent
- Position: Power forward

Personal information
- Born: January 11, 1991 (age 35) Santa Rosa, California
- Listed height: 6 ft 8 in (2.03 m)
- Listed weight: 235 lb (107 kg)

Career information
- High school: Maria Carrillo (Santa Rosa, California)
- College: Santa Rosa JC (2010–2011); Sonoma State (2011–2014)
- NBA draft: 2014: undrafted
- Playing career: 2014–present

Career history
- 2015: Tsukuba Robots
- 2015–2016: Otsuka Corporation Alphas
- 2016: Unión de Santa Fe
- 2016–2018: Tokyo Excellence
- 2019–2020: Iwate Big Bulls

Justin Michael Herold (born January 11, 1991) is an American professional basketball player for Iwate Big Bulls in Japan.
