= Patrick Simon (basketball) =

American basketball player

Free agent
- Position: Power forward

Personal information
- Born: August 25, 1992 (age 34) Spokane, Washington
- Listed height: 6 ft 8 in (2.03 m)
- Listed weight: 220 lb (100 kg)

Career information
- High school: Ephrata (Ephrata, Washington)
- College: Washington State (2010-2012); Seattle Pacific (2012-2014)
- NBA draft: 2014: undrafted
- Playing career: 2014–present

Career history
- 2014-2015: Erdgas Ehingen/Urspringschule
- 2015-2016: Oita Heat Devils
- 2016-2017: Salt Lake City Stars
- 2017-2021: Toyoda Gosei Scorpions

Career highlights
- B3 Scoring leader (2017-18); B3 Rebound leader(2017-18)

Patrick Simon (born August 25, 1992) is an American professional basketball player for Toyoda Gosei Scorpions in Japan.
