= National Basketball League (Japan) =

Basketball league in Japan

- Most recent season or competition: 2015-16 NBL Japan season
- Formerly: Japan Basketball League
- Sport: Basketball
- Founded: 2013
- First season: 2013-14
- Folded: 2016
- Replaced by: B.League
- Owner: Japan Basketball Association
- No. of teams: 12
- Country: Japan
- Confederation: FIBA Asia
- Last champion: Toshiba Brave Thunders Kanagawa
- Most titles: 2 (Toshiba)

The National Basketball League (NBL) was a professional basketball league in Japan run by the Japan Basketball Association (JBA). The first NBL season started in Autumn 2013, replacing the JBA's previous top-flight league, the Japan Basketball League. Below the NBL was the National Basketball Development League (NBDL), which was the successor to the former JBL 2 division.

The NBL and its predecessor existed alongside the bj league, an independent league based on the American sports franchise model that had been active since 2005. The JBA was suspended by FIBA in November 2014 for failing to address the fragmentation of the sport into competing leagues. As a condition of FIBA lifting the suspension in August 2015, the NBL and NBDL merged with the bj-league to form the B.League, which commenced in October 2016. Accordingly, the 2015–16 NBL season was the league's third and final season.

== Teams ==
The league's initial season in 2013-14 consisted of twelve teams. The eight teams that participated in the final season of the JBL1 joined the league, as well as the JBL2 champion Hyogo Storks. The Chiba Jets returned to the JBA system after playing two seasons in the bj-league, including a 9th-place finish in 2012-13. Daytrick Tsukuba intended to join the NBL after finishing third in their first JBL2 season in 2012-13, but subsequent financial difficulties saw them withdraw their application. They were replaced by the newly formed Tsukuba Robots, who submitted a separate application for entry to the league. The twelfth team to join the league was the Kumamoto Volters, who had been seeking entrance into the JBL2 since 2009. Three NBDL teams were given associate membership status, allowing for the possibility of their future promotion to the NBL. However, all three teams (Renova Kagoshima, Tokyo Excellence and Toyota Tsusho Fighting Eagles) ultimately remained in the NBDL for the duration of the competition's existence.

The 2014–15 season saw the Hiroshima Dragonflies enter the league as an expansion team and the Tsukuba Robots transfer from the Western Conference to the Eastern Conference. The Wakayama Trians, who were runners up in the league's first season, withdrew midway through the 2014-15 season in January 2015 due to financial difficulty and were refused entry into the 2015-2016 season. In March 2014 the league issued a public call for expansion teams to join the NBL or NBDL for the 2015-16 season. The Tokyo Hachioji Trains joined the NBDL but the NBL remained at twelve teams. The league abandoned the two-conference system in 2015-16, with teams instead playing five matches against each other for a total 55-game regular season.

National Basketball League Teams
Team name	City, Prefecture	Formed / Joined (Folded)		Previous league	NBL Conference (2013-14 and 2014-15)
Aisin SeaHorses Mikawa	Kariya, Aichi	1947	2013	JBL1	Western
Chiba Jets	Funabashi, Chiba	2005	2013	bj-league	Eastern
Hiroshima Dragonflies	Hiroshima, Hiroshima	2014		-	Western
Hitachi SunRockers Tokyo	Tokyo	2000	2013	JBL1	Eastern
Hyogo Storks/Nishinomiya Storks	Hyogo Prefecture	2011	2013	JBL2	Western
Kumamoto Volters	Kumamoto, Kumamoto	2013		-	Western
Levanga Hokkaido	Sapporo, Hokkaido	2007	2013	JBL1	Eastern
Link Tochigi Brex	Utsunomiya, Tochigi	2007	2013	JBL1	Eastern
Mitsubishi Diamond Dolphins Nagoya	Nagoya, Aichi	1950	2013	JBL1	Western
Toshiba Brave Thunders Kanagawa	Kawasaki, Kanagawa	1950	2013	JBL1	Eastern
Toyota Alvark Tokyo	Fuchū, Tokyo	1948	2013	JBL1	Eastern
Cyberdyne Tsukuba Robots	Tsukuba, Ibaraki	2013		-	Western (13-14), Eastern (14-15)
Wakayama Trians	Wakayama, Wakayama	2013 (2015) (Note: The Panasonic Trians were formed in 1951 and were based in Hirakata, Osaka. They relocated to Wakayama upon joining the NBL.)		JBL1	Western

== Playoff champions ==
Season	Champions	Runners-up
2013–14	Toshiba Brave Thunders Kanagawa	Wakayama Trians
2014–15	Aisin Seahorses Mikawa	Toyota Alvark Tokyo
2015–16	Toshiba Brave Thunders Kanagawa	Aisin SeaHorses Mikawa

== NBL All-star game ==
Season	Date	Arena	Host city	Result	MVP (Team)
2013–14	December 29, 2013	Ōta City General Gymnasium	Ōta, Tokyo	WEST 114-106 EAST	(United States) Michael Parker (Wakayama Trians)
2014–15	January 17, 2015	Ōta City General Gymnasium	Ōta, Tokyo	WEST 127-114 EAST	(France) Amath M'Baye (Mitsubishi Diamond Dolphins Nagoya)
2015–16	January 17, 2016	Todoroki Arena	Kawasaki, Kanagawa	WEST 152-145 EAST (2 OT)	(United States) Davante Gardner (Nishinomiya Storks)
