= Ryūji =

Ryuji
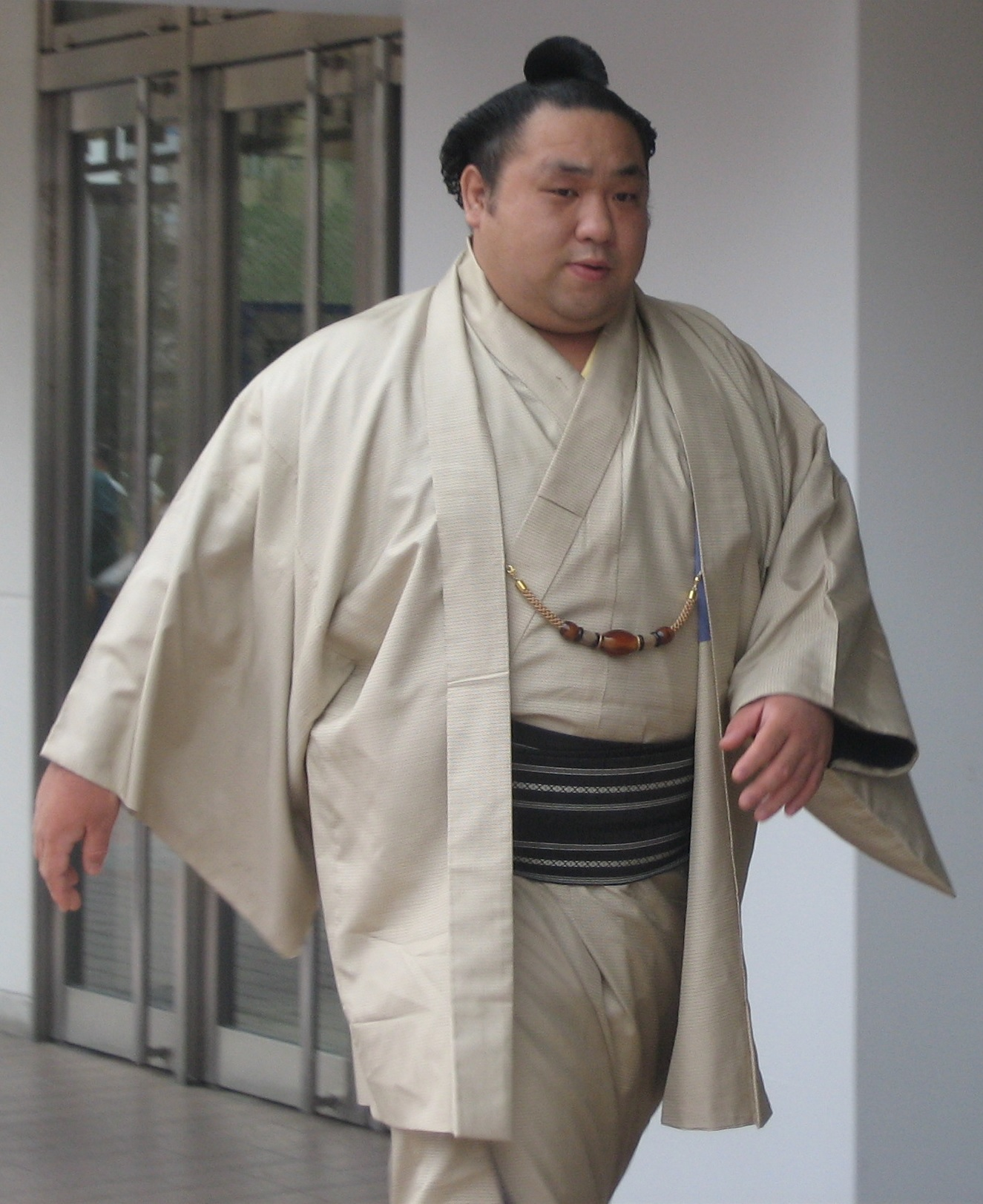
- Ryuji Chiyotaikai. Japanese sumo wrestler.
- Pronunciation: ɾʲɯɯdʑi (IPA)
- Gender: Male

Origin
- Origin: Japanese
- Meaning: Different depending on the kanji. Usually "dragon 2" is the most commonly used kanji.

Other names
- Alternative spelling: Ryuzi (Kunrei-shiki) Ryuzi (Nihon-shiki) Ryuuji, Ryūji, Ryuji (Hepburn)

Ryūji (also spelled Ryuji or Ryuuji) is a common masculine Japanese given name.

== Written forms ==
Ryūji can be written using different kanji characters and can mean:

- 竜二, "dragon, 2"
- 竜次, "dragon, next"
- 竜司, "dragon, rule"
- 竜児, "dragon, child"
- 竜治, "dragon, govern"
- 竜士, "dragon, warrior"
- 龍二, "dragon, 2"
- 龍次, "dragon, next"
- 龍司, "dragon, rule"
- 龍治, "dragon, govern"
- 龍児, "dragon, child"
- 龍士, "dragon, warrior"
- 隆二, "elevate, 2"
- 隆次, "elevate, next"
- 隆司, "elevate, rule"
- 隆児, "elevate, child"
- 隆士, "elevate, warrior"

The name can also be written in hiragana りゅうじ or katakana リュウジ.

== Notable people with the name ==
- Ryuji Aminishiki (安美錦 竜児, born 1978), Japanese sumo wrestler
- Ryuji Aoki (青木 龍史; born 1998), Japanese professional basketball player
- Ryuji Bando (播戸 竜二; born 1979), Japanese footballer
- Ryuji Chiyotaikai (千代大海 龍二, born 1976), Japanese sumo wrestler
- Ryuji Endo (遠藤 竜志; born 1976), Japanese baseball player
- Ryuji Fujita (藤田 隆治; 1907–1965), Japanese artist and Olympic bronze medalist
- Ryuji Fujiyama (藤山 竜仁; born 1973), Japanese former football player
- Ryuji Goto (五藤 隆二; born 1931), Japanese rower
- Ryuji Hara (原 隆二; born 1990), Japanese professional boxer
- Ryuji Hijikata (土方 隆司; born 1978), Japanese professional wrestler
- Ryuji Hirota (廣田 隆治; born 1993), Japanese professional footballer
- Ryuji Horii (堀井 利有司; born 1974), Japanese retired male backstroke swimmer.
- Ryuji Ichioka (一岡 竜司; born 1991), Japanese former professional baseball player
- Ryuji Imada (今田 竜二; born 1976), U.S.-based Japanese professional golfer
- Ryuji Imaichi (今市 隆二; born 1986), Japanese singer
- Ryuji Ishii (石井 龍司; born 1970), Japanese former rugby union player
- Ryuji Ishizue (石末 龍治; born 1964), Japanese former football player
- Ryuji Ito (伊東 竜二; born 1976), Japanese professional wrestler
- Ryuji Izumi (和泉 竜司; born 1993), Japanese footballer
- Ryuji Kajiwara (梶原 龍児; born 1976), Japanese former professional kickboxer and boxer
- Ryuji Kamiyama (上山 竜治; born 1986), Japanese vocalist and actor
- Ryuji Kato (加藤 竜二; born 1969), Japanese footballer
- Ryuji Kawai (河合 竜二; born 1978), Japanese football player
- Ryuji Kawai (basketball) (河合 竜児; born 1975), Japanese coach of the Shimane Susanoo Magic
- Ryuji Kimura (木村 龍治; born 1970), Japanese baseball player
- Ryūji Kita (北 竜二; 1905–1972), Japanese actor
- Ryuji Kitamura (北村 隆二; born 1981), Japanese former football player
- Ryuji Koizumi (小泉 龍司; born 1952), Japanese politician
- Ryuji Kubota (窪田 龍二; born 1976), Japanese former football player
- Ryuji Kumita (組田 龍司; born 1967), Japanese racing driver and team owner
- Ryuji Kusaba (草場 龍治; born 2000), Japanese wheelchair rugby player
- Ryuji Masuda (増田 龍治; born 1968), Japanese CGI animation director
- Ryuji Matsumura (松村 龍二; born 1938), Japanese politician
- Ryuji Michiki (路木 龍次; born 1973), Japanese football player
- Ryuji Miki (三木 竜二; born 1975), Japanese racing and drifting driver
- Ryuji Miura (三浦 龍司; born 2002), Japanese long-distance runner and steeplechaser
- Ryuji Miyade (宮出 隆自; born 1977), Japanese former Nippon Professional Baseball outfielder
- Ryūji Miyajima (宮島 竜治; born 1967), Japanese film editor
- Ryūji Miyamoto (宮本 隆司; born 1947), Japanese photographer
- Ryuji Mizuno (水野 龍司; 1952–2022), Japanese voice actor
- Ryuji Mochizuki (望月 竜次; born 1988), Japanese footballer
- Ryuji Muraki (邑木 隆二; born 1979), Japanese retired sprinter
- Ryuji Noguchi (野口 竜司; born 1995), Japanese rugby union player
- Ryuji Ono (大野 龍二; born 1985), Japanese long-distance runner
- Ryūji Saikachi (槐 柳二; 1928–2017), Japanese voice actor
- Ryuji Sainei (載寧 龍二; born 1981), Japanese actor
- Ryuji Saito (才藤 龍治; born 1993), Japanese footballer
- Ryuji Sasai (笹井 隆司; born 1961), Japanese video game composer
- Ryuji Sato (佐藤 隆治; born 1977), Japanese former football referee
- Ryūji Satomi (里見 隆治; born 1967), Japanese politician
- Ryuji Sawakami (澤上 竜二; born 1993), Japanese footballer
- Ryuji Sonoda (園田 隆二; born 1973), Japanese judoka
- Ryuji Sueoka (末岡 龍二; born 1979), Japanese former football player
- Ryuji Sugimoto (杉本 竜士; born 1993), Japanese football player
- Ryuji Tabuchi (田渕 龍二; born 1973), Japanese former football player
- Ryūji Tanabe (田邊 隆二; 1884–1945), Japanese bureaucrat
- Ryuuji Umeda (梅田 竜二; born 1968), Japanese professional three-cushion billiards player
- Ryuji Utomo (born 1995), Indonesian professional footballer
- Ryuji Wada (和田 竜二; born 1977), Japanese retired jockey and future trainer
- Ryuji Wakatake (若竹 竜士; born 1987), Japanese professional baseball pitcher
- Ryuji Watanabe (渡邊 竜二; born 1971), Japanese general manager of the Toyotsu Fighting Eagles Nagoya
- Ryuji Yamakawa (山川 竜司; born 1970), Japanese retired professional wrestler
- Ryuji Yamamoto (born 1988), Japanese racing driver
- Ryuji Yamane (山根 隆治; born 1948), Japanese politician
- Ryuji Yokoe (横江 竜司; born 1978), Japanese motorcycle racer
- Ryuji Yokoyama (横山 竜士; born 1970), Japanese professional baseball player

== Fictional characters ==
- Ryuji Danma (弾間 龍二), a character in the manga series Shonan Junai Gumi and its sequel Great Teacher Onizuka
- Ryuji Goda (郷田 龍司), a side character in Yakuza 0 and the main antagonist in Yakuza 2 and Yakuza Kiwami 2
- Ryuji "The Blade" Hanada (花田 竜二), a character in the manga series Crying Freeman
- Ryuji Hattori (服部 竜二), a character from the Kunio-Kun video game series
- Ryuji Ikeda (池田 竜次), a character in the manga series Initial D
- Ryuji Iwasaki (岩崎 リュウジ), a character from Tokumei Sentai Go-Busters
- Ryuji Kisaragi (如月 竜司), the main character of the light novel and anime series Dragon Crisis!
- Ryuji Kusaka (九坂 隆二), a character from Inazuma Eleven GO Galaxy
- Ryuji Midorikawa (綠川 龍二), a character from Inazuma Eleven
- Ryuji Nagumo (七雲 竜次), a character from Hajime no Ippo
- Ryuuji Otogi (御伽 龍児), a character in the anime and manga series Yu-Gi-Oh!
- Ryuji Sakamoto (坂本 竜司), a major character in the video game Persona 5
- Ryuji Sugashita (菅下 竜二), a character in the manga series DNA²
- Ryuji Suguro (勝呂 竜士), a major character in Blue Exorcist
- Ryuji Takane (高嶺 竜児), the main character of the manga and anime series Ring ni Kakero
- Ryuji Takasu (高須 竜児), one of the main characters in the anime and light novel series Toradora!
- Ryuji Takayama (高山 竜司), a central character in the Ringu Trilogy
- Ryuji Toramaru (虎丸 龍次), a character in the manga series Sakigake!! Otokojuku
- Ryuji Yamazaki (山崎 竜二), a video game character in Fatal Fury and King of Fighters series
