= Kobe Storks =

- Conference: West
- Division: B2
- Leagues: B.League
- Founded: 2011
- History: Hyogo Storks; 2011–2015; Nishinomiya Storks; 2015–2023; Kobe Storks; 2023–present
- Arena: GLION ARENA KOBE
- Capacity: 10,000
- Location: Kobe, Hyogo
- Main sponsor: Sym Energy
- Head coach: Taizo Kawabe
- Ownership: Storks Co., Ltd.
- Championships: JBL2 - 1, B2 - 1
- Website: www.storks.jp
Home	Away

The Kobe Storks (神戸ストークス, Kōbe Sutōkusu) are a Japanese professional basketball team based in Kobe. The team most recently competed in the second division of the B.League. Starting from the 2026–27 season, the team will compete in the B.League Premier, the league's highest division, as a member of the Western Conference. The team plays its home games at Glion Arena Kobe.

== History ==
The club was formed in 2011 as the Hyogo Storks (兵庫ストークス） and entered the second division of the Japan Basketball League (JBL2) in the 2011-12 season, finishing with a record of 17 wins and 10 losses. The club was JBL2 league champions in the 2012-13 season with a record of 27 wins and 5 losses, which was the final season of the league before it was reformed as the National Basketball Development League. The club’s success in the 2012-13 season earned it promotion to the first division of the JBL, which was reformed as the NBL for the 2013-2014 season.

Logo used during the Nishinomiya era.

On 16 July 2015 the Storks announced an agreement with the City of Nishinomiya that will see the team based in the city and the name changed to the Nishinomiya Storks. The decision is also one move aimed at the club securing a position in the new Japan Professional Basketball League that will commence in the autumn of 2016.

== Home arena ==
During the 2013–14 and 2014-15 seasons, the Hyogo Storks played approximately half of their home games at the Kobe Central Gymnasium in the Chuo Ward of Kobe. As the team was officially based within Hyogo Prefecture (and not Kobe city), it played home games at various towns within the prefecture.

For the 2015-2016 season, the Nishinomiya Storks will play about 40% (around ten) and since 2016-2017 season, around two-thirds of their home games at the Nishinomiya City Central Gymnasium.

- Nishinomiya City Central Gymnasium
- Kobe Tokiwa Arena
- Wink Gymnasium
- Kakogawa Municipal General Gymnasium
- Komagatani Sports Park Gymnasium
- Takarazuka City General Gymnasium
- Sumoto City Cultural Gymnasium
- Kamigori Sports Center

== Coaches ==
- BT Toews
- Danny Yoshikawa
- Yasunori Ueda
- Kensaku Tennichi
- Miodrag Rajković
- Mathias Fischer

== Roster ==
Kobe Storks roster
Players
Coaches

Pos.	No.	Nat.	Name	Ht.	Age
PF	1	(Japan)	Ryota Nakanishi	1.99 m (6 ft 6 in)	37 – 24 December 1988
C	2	(Japan)	Patrick Kalonji Isoyama	2.06 m (6 ft 9 in)	37 – 10 October 1989
C	5	(United States)	Isaac Butts	2.08 m (6 ft 10 in)	37 – 28 May 1989
G	7	(Japan)	Yusuke Tsunai	1.84 m (6 ft 0 in)	30 – 4 April 1996
SF	9	(Japan)	Naoki Tani	1.93 m (6 ft 4 in)	38 – 3 July 1988
PG	10	(Japan)	Shota Watanabe (C)	1.80 m (5 ft 11 in)	33 – 26 June 1993
PG	11	(Japan)	Fuki Yamamoto	1.77 m (5 ft 10 in)	28 – 9 August 1998
G	12	(Japan)	Sena Kawashima	1.87 m (6 ft 2 in)	26 – 14 March 2000
PG	13	(Japan)	Noriaki Dohara	1.78 m (5 ft 10 in)	37 – 7 September 1989
PF	21	(United States)	Nathan Adrian	2.06 m (6 ft 9 in)	31 – 21 March 1995
SF	22	(United States)	Saleh, Lucas	2.01 m (6 ft 7 in)	26 – 1 May 2000
PG	25	(Japan)	Ryoga Fujiwara	1.78 m (5 ft 10 in)	24 – 8 January 2002
G/F	30	(Japan)	Ryuya Kaneda	1.92 m (6 ft 4 in)	26 – 29 September 2000
PG	90	(Japan)	Riichi Nomizo	1.65 m (5 ft 5 in)	23 – 13 January 2003

Head coach

- (Japan) Shunsuke Todo

Assistant coach(es)

- (Japan) Ryusei Shimoji

Legend

- (C) Team captain
- Injured

- Roster
Updated: December 31, 2025

== Notable players ==
- Draelon Burns
- Isaac Butts
- Seaun Eddy
- Davante Gardner
- Herbert Hill
- Billy Knight
- Cheikh Mbodj
- Yuto Otsuka
- Larry Owens
- Dillion Sneed
- Akitomo Takeno
- Jordan Vandenberg
- Brad Waldow
- DeVaughn Washington
