= Markhuri Sanders-Frison =

American basketball coach

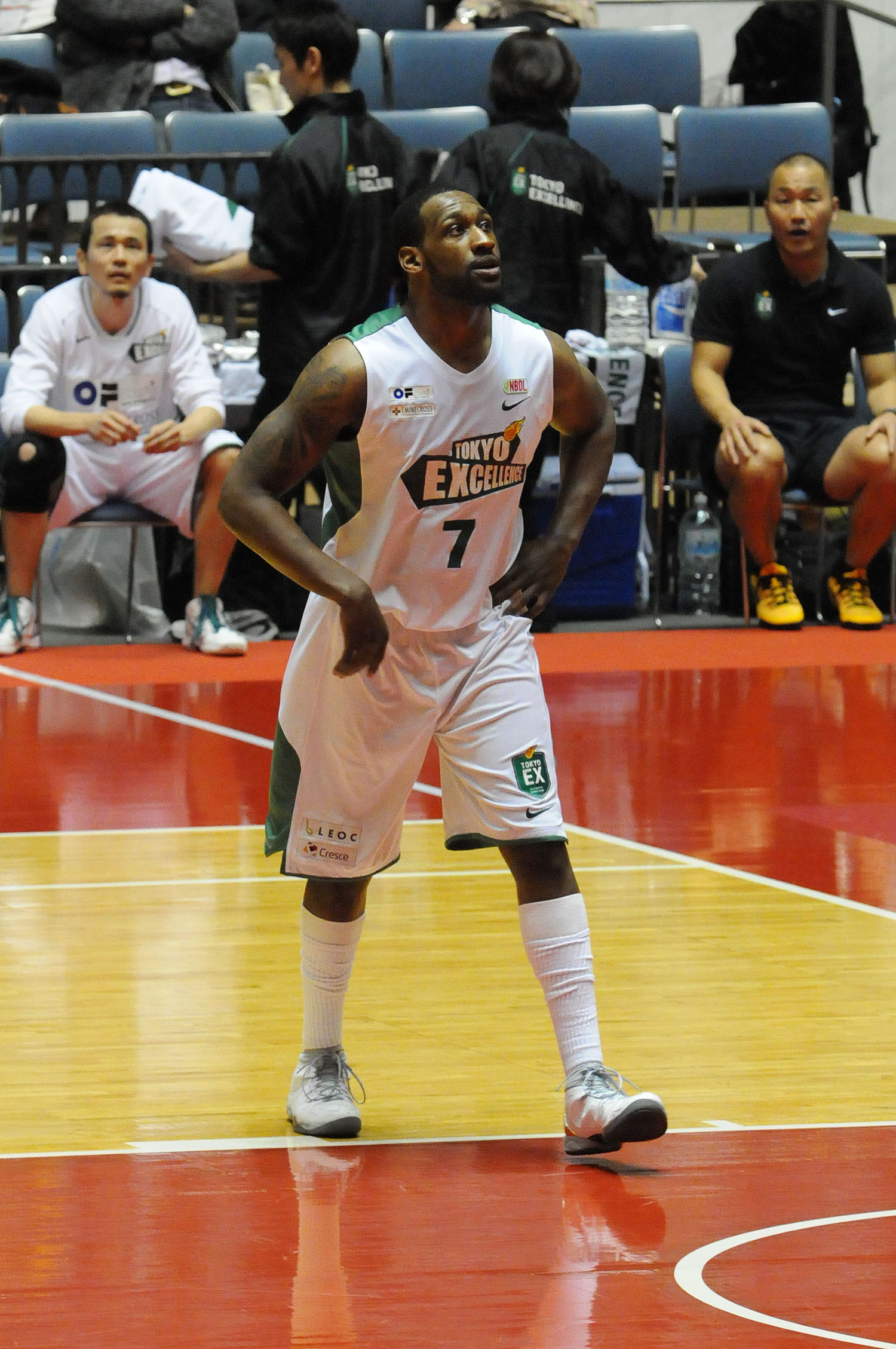

Idaho Vandals
- Position: Assistant coach
- League: Big Sky Conference

Personal information
- Born: June 15, 1988 (age 38) Portland, Oregon, U.S.
- Listed height: 6 ft 7 in (2.01 m)
- Listed weight: 265 lb (120 kg)

Career information
- High school: Jefferson (Portland, Oregon)
- College: South Plains College; California (2009-2011)
- NBA draft: 2011: undrafted
- Playing career: 2011–2021

Career history

Playing
- 2011-2012: Fuerza Guinda de Nogales
- 2012-2013: Goldfields Giants
- 2013-2015: Tokyo Excellence
- 2015: Osaka Evessa
- 2016-2017: Passlab Yamagata Wyverns
- 2017-2018: Iwate Big Bulls
- 2018-2019: Sun Rockers Shibuya
- 2020-2021: Aisin AW Areions Anjo

Coaching
- 2022-2024: Oregon (GA)
- 2024-present: Idaho (assistant)

Career highlights
- 2x NBDL Champions (2013-15); 2x NBDL Rebound leader (2013-15)

Markhuri Sanders-Frison (born June 15, 1988) is an American basketball coach and former player. He is currently an assistant coach for the Idaho Vandals.

He played college basketball for the California Golden Bears before playing professionally in Mexico, Australia, and Japan. He last played for Aisin AW Areions Anjo.

Sanders-Frison served as graduate manager for the Oregon Ducks men's basketball program.

A 2011 graduate of the University of California, Berkeley, Sanders-Frison was starting center for the 2010 team that led the program to its first conference title since 1960.

== Career statistics ==
Legend
| GP | Games played | GS | Games started | MPG | Minutes per game |
| FG% | Field goal percentage | 3P% | 3-point field goal percentage | FT% | Free throw percentage |
| RPG | Rebounds per game | APG | Assists per game | SPG | Steals per game |
| BPG | Blocks per game | PPG | Points per game | **Bold** | Career high |

| * | Led the league |

| Year | Team | GP | GS | MPG | FG% | 3P% | FT% | RPG | APG | SPG | BPG | PPG |
|---|---|---|---|---|---|---|---|---|---|---|---|---|
| 2013-14 | Tokyo Ex | 32 | 32 | 27.9 | .573 | .333 | .472 | 15.2* | 1.8 | 1.0 | 0.5 | 15.4 |
| 2014-15 | Tokyo Ex | 31 | 30 | 30.1 | .614 | .000 | .553 | 15.9* | 1.8 | 1.2 | 0.3 | 22.5 |
| 2015-16 | Osaka | 22 | 7 | 18.4 | .449 | .000 | .469 | 8.0 | 1.5 | 0.6 | 0.5 | 6.3 |
| 2016-17 | Yamagata | 45 | 39 | 23.0 | .501 | .167 | .571 | 10.4 | 1.4 | 0.5 | 0.6 | 12.6 |
| 2017-18 | Iwate Big Bulls | 46 | 34 | 25.6 | .474 | .000 | .580 | 9.6 | 2.8 | 0.7 | 0.2 | 11.1 |
