= Yasunori Ueda =

Japanese basketball coach

San-en NeoPhoenix
- Position: U15 coach
- League: B.League

Personal information
- Born: October 25, 1986 (age 40) Awara, Fukui

Career information
- High school: Hokuriku (Fukui, Fukui)
- College: Chubu Gakuin University

Career history

Coaching
- 2012-2013: BV Chemnitz 99 (asst)
- 2013-2014: Chubu Gakuin University
- 2014: Hyogo Storks (asst)
- 2015-2016: Hyogo Storks
- 2016-2017: Iwate Big Bulls

Yasunori Ueda (上田康徳, Ueda Yasunori) is the former head coach of the Iwate Big Bulls in the Japanese B.League.

== Head coaching record ==
Legend
Regular season	G	Games coached	W	Games won	L	Games lost	W–L %	Win–loss %
Playoffs	PG	Playoff games	PW	Playoff wins	PL	Playoff losses	PW–L %	Playoff win–loss %

Team	Year	G	W	L	W–L%	Finish	PG	PW	PL	PW–L%	Result
Hyogo Storks	2014-15	36	8	28	.222	4th in Western	-	-	-	–	-
Nishinomiya Storks	2015-16	54	13	41	.241	11th	-	-	-	–	-
Iwate Big Bulls	2016-17	60	15	45	.250	6th in B2 Eastern	-	-	-	–	-
Iwate Big Bulls	2017	28	2	26	.071	Fired	-	-	-	–	-
