= Takeno =

Takeno may refer to:

- Takeno, Hyōgo, a former town in Kinosaki District, Hyōgo Prefecture, Japan
- Takeno Station, a railway station in Toyooka, Hyōgo Prefecture, Japan

== People with the surname ==
- Akitomo Takeno (竹野 明倫, born 1985), Japanese basketball player
- Takeno Jōō (武野 紹鴎, 1502–1555), Japanese tea master
