= Akitomo =

- Gender: Male

Origin
- Origin: Japanese
- Meaning: Different meanings depending on the kanji used

Akitomo (written: 明友 or 明倫) is a masculine Japanese given name. Notable people with the name include:

- Akitomo Kaneko (金子 明友; 1927–2024), Japanese gymnast
- Akitomo Takeno (竹野 明倫; born 1985), Japanese basketball player and coach
