= National Basketball Development League (Japan) =

Former second-tier league

The National Basketball Development League (NBDL) was a professional basketball league based in Japan. It was a second-tier league below the National Basketball League and was formed in 2013 as the successor of JBL2, the second division of the former Japan Basketball League. After three seasons the league merged with the National Basketball League and its rival the bj-league to form the B.League.

== History ==
In 2012 the Japan Basketball Association announced that it was rebranding the Japan Basketball League to the National Basketball League, to commence in the 2013-14 season. At the same time, it was announced that the second division of the JBL would be called the National Basketball Development League. The league commenced in October 2013 with eight of the twelve teams that competed in JBL2 the previous season and Tokyo Excellence, a newly formed team. The other four teams that made up the 12-team JBL2 league did not join the NBDL, with Daytrick Tsukuba and the Hyogo Storks earning promotion to the NBL while the Hitachi Cable Bulldogs joined a Kanto corporate league. The Ishikawa Blue Sparks sought entry into the NBDL but were denied due to not satisfying the league's capital requirements; the club subsequently announced it would fold at the close of the final JBL2 season. Three of the NBDL's teams, the Excellence, Toyota Tsusho Fighting Eagles and Renova Kagoshima received associate membership to the NBL, which granted them the possibility of future promotion to the top league. The Fighting Eagles (30-2) finished on top of the standings in the first season of the league, but were defeated by second-placed Tokyo Excellence (29-3) in the championship match.

A team from Miyazaki Prefecture was to join the NBDL for the 2014-15 season to provide an even number of teams in the league, but withdrew in November 2013. TGI D-Rise, the development club of the NBL's Link Tochigi Brex, relocated to Yamagata Prefecture before the start of the season and was renamed as the Passlab Yamagata Wyverns. The Tokyo-based Kuroda Electric Bullet Spirits withdrew to compete in the Kanto corporate league and transferred their NBDL membership to the newly-formed Earthfriends Tokyo Z. The result of the changes was that the second season of the league was again contested by nine teams. The Fighting Eagles again finished the regular season in first place with a 30-2 win–loss record, but fell to the Aisin AW Areions in the semi-final. Second-placed Excellence defeated the Areions in the final to claim their second consecutive championship.

During the 2015 off-season the merger of the three professional leagues and formation of the B.League was announced, with the NBDL teams placed in the second and third divisions of the new competition. The final season of the NBDL saw the Tokyo Hachioji Trains join as an expansion club, taking the league to ten teams. The Fighting Eagles finished on top of the regular season standings for a third consecutive year with a 32-4 record. However, the third-placed Excellence again prevailed in the playoffs, defeating the second-placed Otsuka Alphas in the semi-final before overcoming the Fighting Eagles 89-70 in the final.

== Format ==
The teams competing in the NBDL were grouped in a single standings table. In the first season, teams played four matches against each other team in the league for a 32-game season, with the four highest-placed teams advancing to the semi-finals. With the addition of a tenth team in 2015, the season increased to 36 games.

== Teams and standings by year ==
Team	City, Prefecture	Final standings by year						2016 B.League Division
Team	City, Prefecture	2013-14 Season		2014-15 Season		2015-16 Season		2016 B.League Division
Team	City, Prefecture	Regular season	Playoffs	Regular season	Playoffs	Regular season	Playoffs	2016 B.League Division
Aisin AW Areions Anjo	Anjō, Aichi	3rd (20-12)	Fourth-place	4th (16-16)	Runners-up	7th (16-20)	-	Division 3
Earthfriends Tokyo Z	Ōta, Tokyo	-		3rd (25-7)	Fourth-place	5th (22-14)	-	Division 2
Kuroda Electric Bullet Spirits	Tokyo	8th (8-24)	-	Withdrawn from professional basketball				
Otsuka Corporation Alphas	Tokyo	7th (11-21)	-	5th (16-16)	-	2nd (26-10)	Third-place	Division 3
Passlab Yamagata Wyverns	Yamagata, Yamagata	-		7th (10-22)	-	4th (23-13)	Fourth-place	Division 2
Renova Kagoshima	Kagoshima, Kagoshima	6th (11-21)	-	8th (5-27)	-	9th (6-30)	-	Division 2
TGI D-Rise	Tochigi, Tochigi	4th (17-15)	Third-place	Relocated to Yamagata				
Tokio Marine Nichido Big Blue	Nerima, Tokyo	9th (6-26)	-	9th (4-28)	-	8th (8-28)	-	Division 3
Tokyo Excellence	Itabashi, Tokyo	2nd (29-3)	Champions	2nd (27-5)	Champions	3rd (25-11)	Champions	Division 2
Tokyo Hachioji Trains	Hachiōji, Tokyo	-				6th (17-19)	-	Division 3
Toyoda Gosei Scorpions	Kiyosu, Aichi	5th (12-20)	-	6th (11-21)	-	10th (5-31)	-	Division 3
Toyota Tsusho Fighting Eagles Nagoya	Nagoya, Aichi	1st	Runners-up	1st (30-2)	Third-place	1st (32-4)	Runners-up	Division 2
