= Yokohama Excellence =

- Conference: Eastern
- Division: Second
- Leagues: B.League
- Founded: 2002
- History: Excellence (2002–2012); Tokyo Excellence (2012–2021); Yokohama Excellence (2021–present)
- Arena: Yokohama Budokan
- Capacity: 3,000
- Location: Yokohama, Japan
- Head coach: Takaki Ishida
- Ownership: Kato Works
- Championships: NBDL: 3 (2013–14, 2014–15, 2015–16); B3 League: 1 (2018–19)
- Website: yokohama-ex.jp
Home	Away

The Yokohama Excellence (横浜エクセレンス, Yokohama Ekuserensu) are a Japanese professional basketball team based in Yokohama. The Excellence compete in the B.League One, the second division of the B.League, as a member of the Central Conference. Prior to the B.League's establishment, the club played in the National Basketball Development League, winning the championship in all three years of the league's existence.

== History ==
The club's roots lie in an amateur club named Excellence formed by Dr. Shuichi Tsuji in 2002. The team unsuccessfully sought entry into the reformed Japan Basketball League (JBL) in 2007 and thereafter continued to compete at the amateur level. During its ten-year history as an amateur club, the Excellence qualified for the All-Japan Club Basketball Championships on four occasions and finished in third place in 2004 and 2011. The team was coached by American Bob Pierce for four years from 2002 until 2005.

=== NBDL (2013–2016) ===
In July 2012 Tsuji announced on his blog that he had successfully gained entry for the club into the National Basketball Development League (NBDL), a new league that was to commence in 2013 as a replacement of the second division of the JBL. In the same announcement Tsuji declared the goal was for the Excellence to be promoted to the first division NBL by 2015, which would make the club the first Tokyo-based fully professional club in the top league run by the Japan Basketball Association. At that time, most teams participating in JBA-sanctioned leagues were corporate teams and most players were employed by the parent corporations rather than paid as professional athletes. Tsuji also said that the amateur Excellence team coached by Tsuji would continue to exist under the umbrella of the professional club, which would be named Tokyo Excellence.

Tokyo Excellence was the only new team to compete in the inaugural season of the NBDL, the other teams in the 10-team league having competed in the JBL2 the previous season. The club was coached by American Michael Olson in their first season and led by two American import players, Joe Wolfinger and Markhuri Sanders-Frison. Excellence had a successful first season, finishing in second place on the standings with a 29–3 win–loss record, with all of their losses coming at the hands of the first-placed Toyota Tsusho Fighting Eagles. The Excellence defeated the Aisin AW Areions in the semi-final and then overcame the Fighting Eagles 93–77 in the final to claim the championship title after trailing 38–32 at half time. Yusuke Karino scored 33 points in the final and won the playoff MVP award. Five Excellence players including Karino and Wolfinger were selected for the Eastern Conference's All-Star team.

Olson moved to the NBL's Hitachi Sunrockers during the 2014 off-season and the Excellence hired Shinya Tagata as his replacement for the 2014–15 season. The Excellence and Fighting Eagles again led the league throughout the season, with both teams securing a playoff berth in early February The Excellence ended the regular season with a 27–5 record, again finishing in second place behind the Fighting Eagles. The Excellence overcame Tokyo rivals Earthfriends Tokyo Z in the semi-final before defeating the Areions in the final, with the Excellence's Sanders named as playoff MVP.

The Excellence signed Amjyot Singh and Amritpal Singh, both members of India's national basketball team, in August 2015. Amjyot finished the 2015–16 as the league's second-best shot blocker (1.6 blocks per game) and Amritpal finished third in the league in field goal percentage (55.1%). With guard Tatsuya Nishiyama as captain, the Excellence finished in third place with a 25–11 win–loss record. Karino was named to the league's first five and Tagata won the coach of the year award, despite the club announcing nine days before the final that Tagata would not be returning to the club the following year. The club again prevailed in the playoffs, defeating the Fighting Eagles 89–70 in the final to secure a third consecutive championship. Karino led the scoring in the final with 23 points, and Hiroaki Tobita contributed 16 points and 7 rebounds to be named playoff MVP.

=== B.League (2016–) ===
In August 2015 it was announced that the Excellence would play in the second division of the B.League, a new three-division league created from the merger of the NBL, NBDL and bj league that is to start competition in September 2016. The 2016 off-season saw major changes in both playing and coaching staff. Masaki Hayamizu, who coached the Tokyo Hachioji Trains the previous season, was hired as the head coach in July. B.League rules limit second division teams to two import players and one naturalized player; the Excellence signed 22-year-old centre and Colorado Mesa University graduate Ryan Stephan and former Renova Kagoshima forward/centre Luke Evans as their imports. The team will commence their first B.League campaign with home games against former NBDL team Earthfriends Tokyo Z on 24 and 25 September 2016.

=== B3 League (2023-2025) ===
For the 2023-2024 and 2024-2025 seasons, the Yokohama Excellence have solidified their position in the B3 League, consistently qualifying for the playoffs. Following their 2021 relocation from Itabashi, Tokyo, the club has established the Yokohama Budokan as its primary home venue. Under the ownership of Yokohama Excellence Co., Ltd. (a subsidiary of RS Technologies), the club has increased its community engagement in the Kanagawa Prefecture, aiming for a B2 license through improved attendance and financial metrics required by the league's "B.革新"(B. Innovation) restructuring plan.

== Players ==
=== Current roster ===
Yokohama Excellence roster
Players
Coaches

Pos.	No.	Nat.	Name
PF	0	(Japan)	Wesley Furukawa
PG	4	(Japan)	Yutaka Tsukamoto
SF	5	(United States)	L. J. Peak
PG	8	(Japan)	Tatsuya Nishiyama
PF	9	(Japan)	Ryo Hasegawa
C	13	(United States)	Ryan Stephan
SF	14	(Japan)	Makoto Sato
SG	21	(Japan)	Takumi Masuko
SF	24	(Japan)	Shota Osaki
PG	33	(Japan)	Tatsuhiko Toshino (C)
PF	40	(United States)	Jordan Faison
PG	51	(Japan)	Dan Taguchi
G/F	54	(Japan)	Samuel Sawaji Jr.

Head coach

Takaki Ishida

Assistant coach(es)

Riki Tamaki
Berry Demarcus

Legend

- (C) Team captain
- Injured

- Roster
Updated: December 27 2022

== Notable former players ==
Former logo

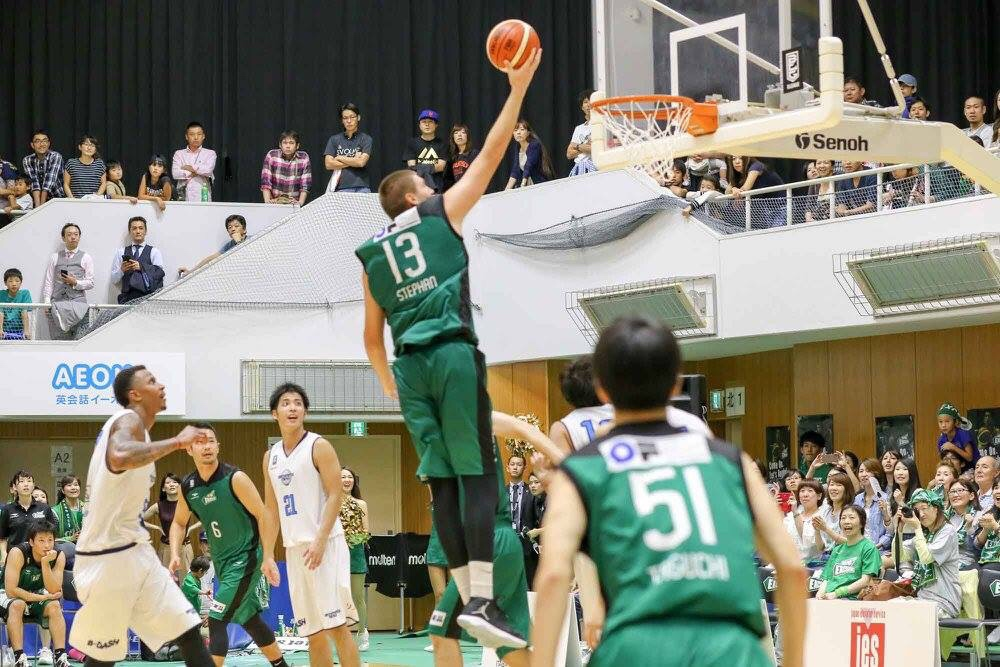

- (Malta) Samuel Deguara
- (United States) Luke Evans (fr)
- (Japan) Yoshinori Kaneta
- (Japan) Yusuke Karino
- (United States) Markhuri Sanders-Frison
- (India) Amjyot Singh
- (India) Amritpal Singh
- (United States) Ryan Stephan [tl]

== Coaches ==
- Robert Pierce
- Dan Weiss
- Michael Olson
- Masaki Hayamizu
- Takaki Ishida

== Arenas ==
- Yokohama Budokan
- Itabashi Azusawa Gymnasium
- Arena Tachikawa Tachihi
- Higashimurayama Citizens Sports Center
- Kitamoto City Sports Center

== Practice facilities ==
- Kato Factory Arena
