= Itabashi Azusawa Gymnasium =

Home arena of the Japan's professional basketball league

Coordinates: 35°46′42.2″N 139°41′54″E

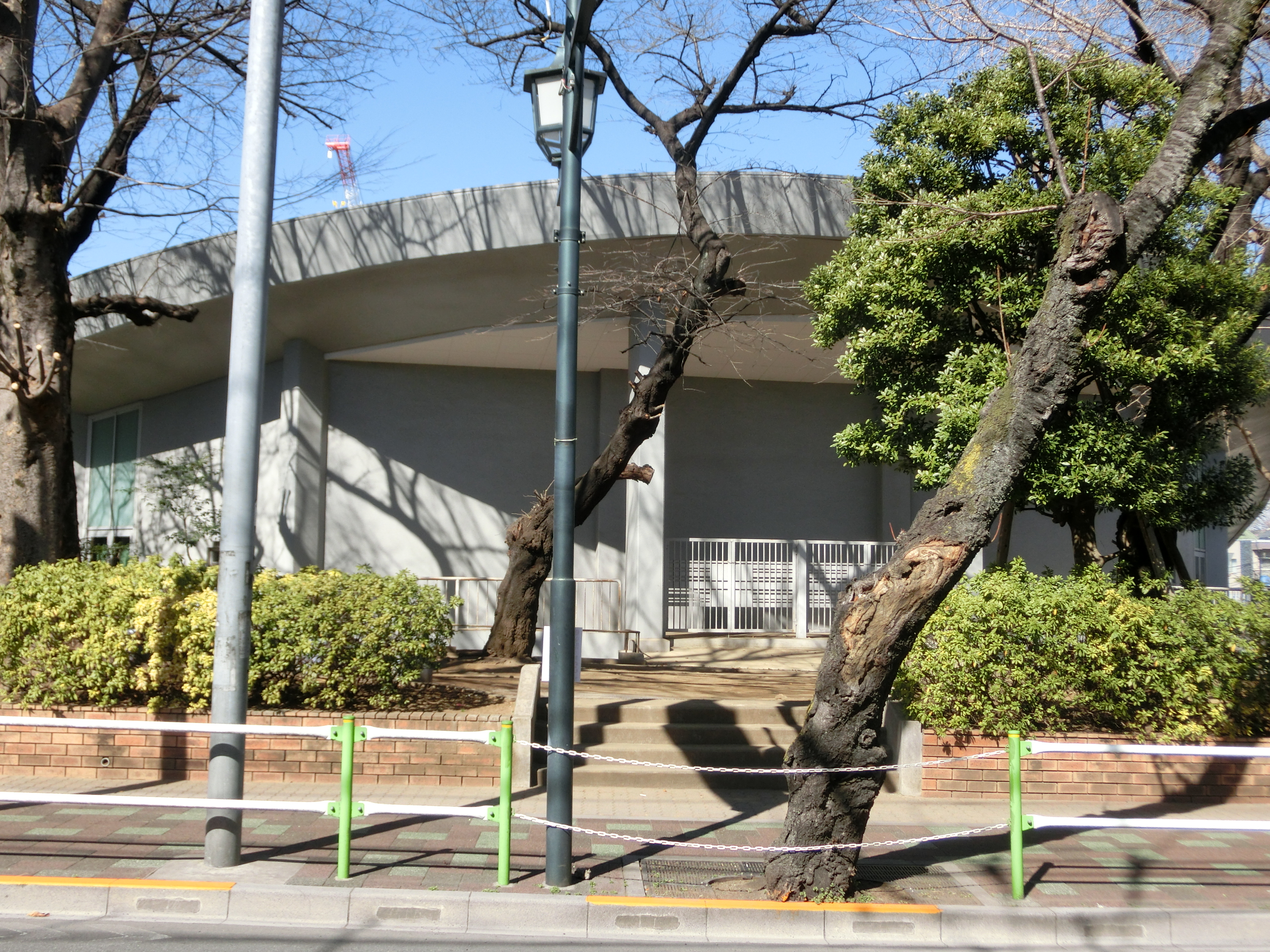
- Interactive map of Itabashi Azusawa Gymnasium
- Full name: Itabashi Azusawa Gymnasium
- Location: Itabashi, Tokyo, Japan
- Owner: Itabashi-ku
- Operator: Tokyo Dome Corporation

Construction
- Opened: April 18, 1968
- Renovated: 2009
- Expanded: 2009
- Cost

Tenants
- Tokyo Excellence; Wrestling World Cup (2014)

Itabashi Azusawa Gymnasium is an arena in Itabashi, Tokyo, Japan. It is the home arena of the Tokyo Excellence of the B.League, Japan's professional basketball league. This building does not meet the requirements of the B2 license and caused Tokyo Ex's relegation to B3 twice.

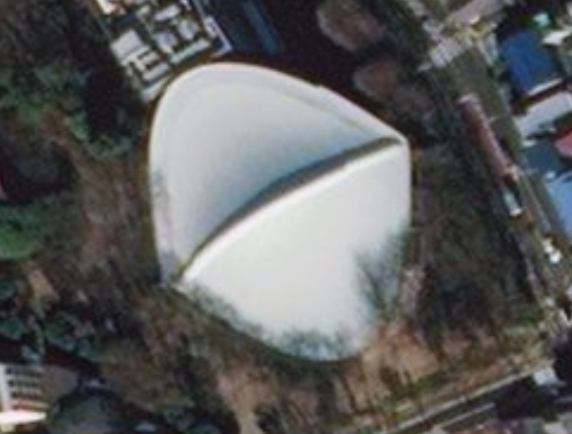
Satellite view
