= Samuel Sawaji Jr. =

Japanese American basketball player

Samuel Sawaji Jr. 澤地サミュエル・ジュニア
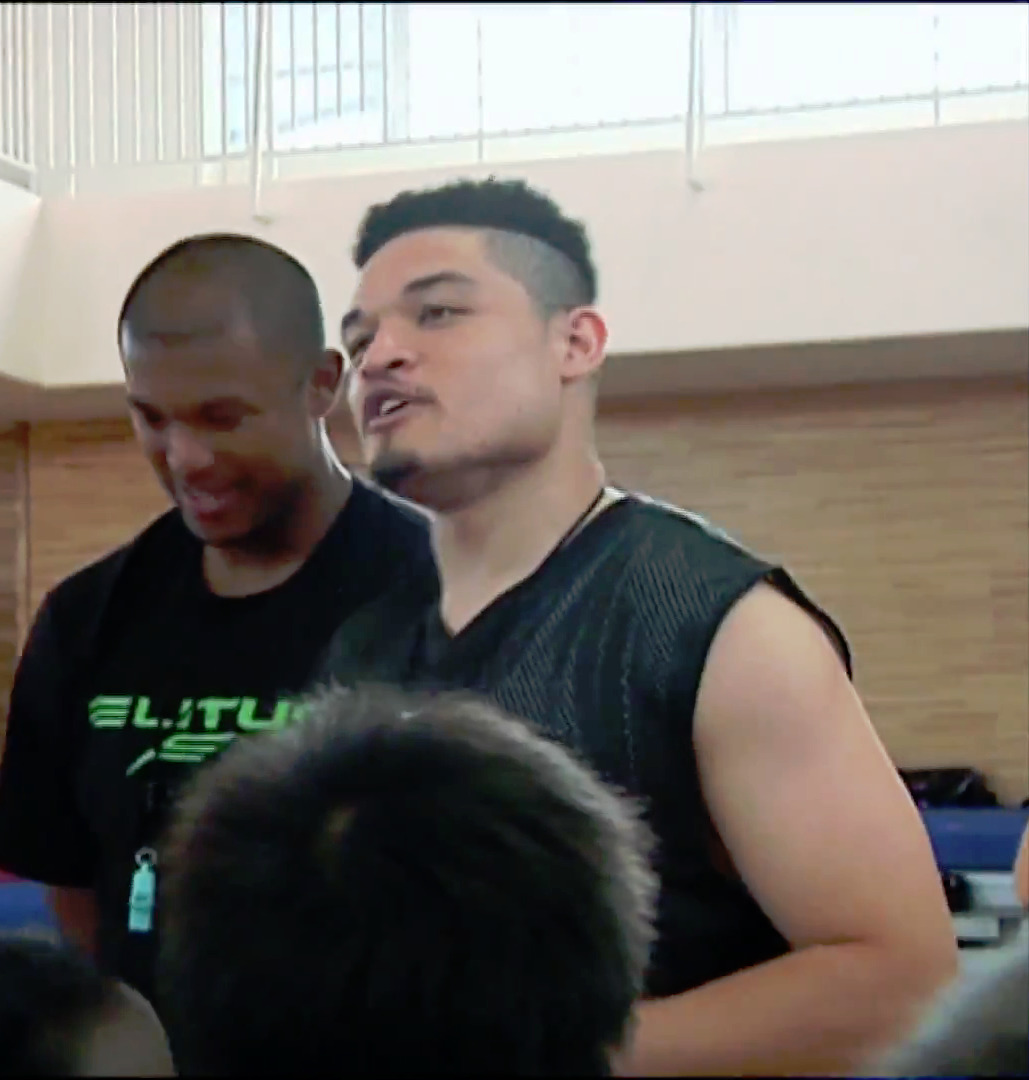

Personal information
- Born: January 5, 1990 (age 36) U.S. Fleet Activities Yokosuka, Japan
- Listed height: 6 ft 1 in (1.85 m)
- Listed weight: 212 lb (96 kg)

Career information
- High school: Nile C. Kinnick (Yokosuka, Kanagawa)
- College: Gordon College
- Playing career: 2012–2023
- Position: Forward

Career history
- 2012–2013: Akita Northern Happinets
- 2013–2014: Osaka Evessa
- 2014: Tokyo Cinq Rêves
- 2014–2015: Gunma Crane Thunders
- 2015–2016: Toyama Grouses
- 2016–2017: Iwate Big Bulls
- 2017–2018: Shiga Lakestars
- 2018–2019: Saitama Broncos
- 2019–2020: Tokyo Cinq Rêves
- 2020–2022: Tokyo Hachioji Bee Trains
- 2022-2023: Yokohama Excellence

Samuel Sawaji Green Jr. (born January 5, 1990) is a Japanese American professional basketball player who last played for the Yokohama Excellence of the B.League in Japan. He was selected by the Akita Northern Happinets with the 14th overall pick in the 2012 bj League draft.

== Career statistics ==
Legend
GP	Games played	GS	Games started	MPG	Minutes per game
FG%	Field goal percentage	3P%	3-point field goal percentage	FT%	Free throw percentage
RPG	Rebounds per game	APG	Assists per game	SPG	Steals per game
BPG	Blocks per game	PPG	Points per game	**Bold**	Career high

=== Regular season ===
Year	Team	GP	GS	MPG	FG%	3P%	FT%	RPG	APG	SPG	BPG	PPG
2012–13	Akita	9	1	3	**.778**	–	.500	0.9	0.2	0.1	0	1.8
2013–14	Osaka	22	1	10.4	.529	–	.400	1.6	0.2	**0.5**	0	**3.7**
2013–14	Tokyo CR	16	9	**12.6**	.400	.000	.286	**3.1**	**0.6**	0.4	0	3.4
2014–15	Gunma	42		6.6	.592	.000	**.700**	1.5	0.3	0.1	0	2.2
2015–16	Toyama	31		4.6	.377	**.143**	.600	.8	.2	.1	.0	1.9
2016–17	Iwate	**50**	2	7.6	.465		.621	1.6	.3	.1	.0	2.2
2017–18	Shiga	20		3.9	.421	.000	.500	.5	.1	.1	.0	0.8
2018–19	Saitama	55	16	14.5	.460	.341	.726	2.8	.7	.4	.0	5.5
2019–20	Tokyo CR	27	8	18.7	.492	.275	.533	3.3	1.5	.5	.0	5.4

=== Playoffs ===
Year	Team	GP	GS	MPG	FG%	3P%	FT%	RPG	APG	SPG	BPG	PPG
2015–16	Toyama	5		2.80	.556	1.000	.500	1.0	1.0	0	0	2.4
