= Makoto Sawaguchi =

Japanese basketball player

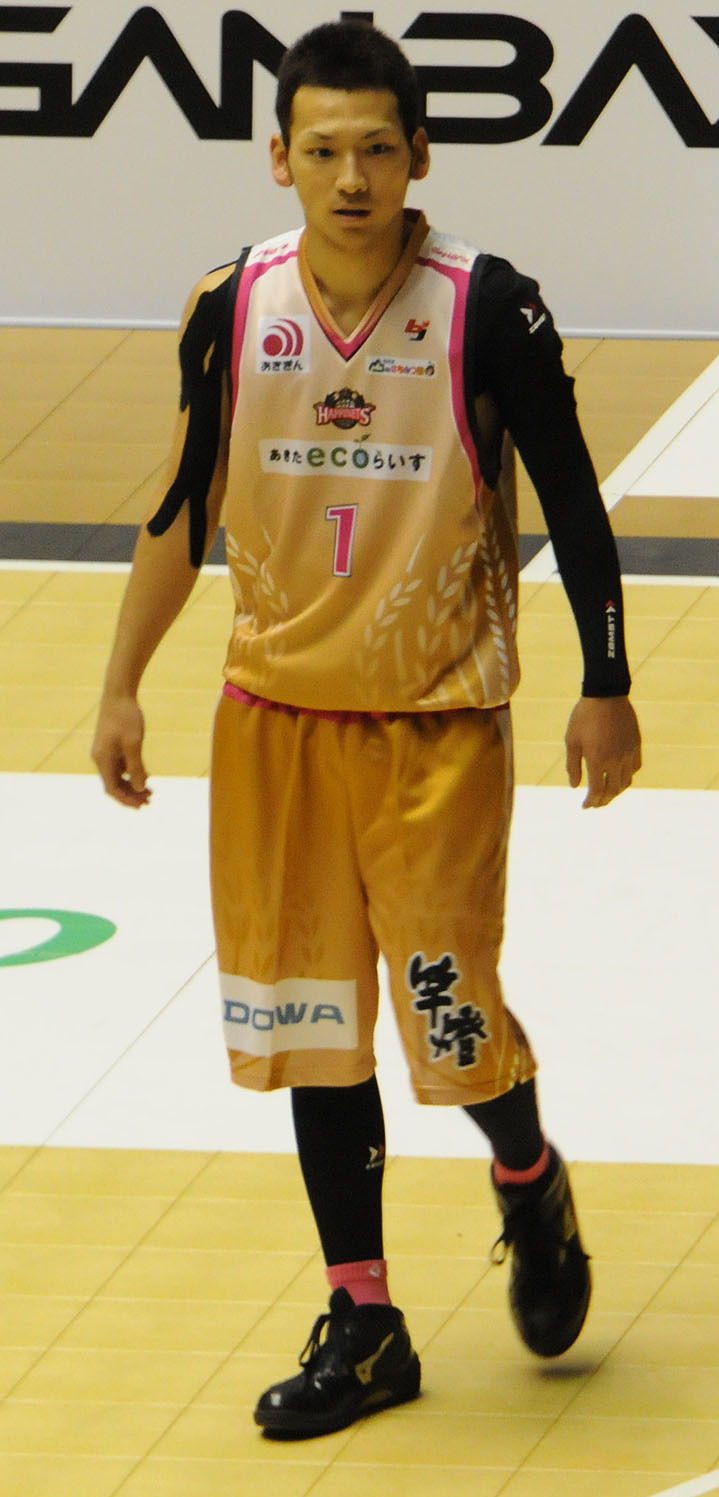
- Sawaguchi at Akita Prefectural Gymnasium

Iwate Big Bulls
- Position: Assistant coach
- League: B.League

Personal information
- Born: December 5, 1991 (age 34) Kamaishi, Iwate, Japan
- Listed height: 6 ft 1 in (1.85 m)
- Listed weight: 176 lb (80 kg)

Career information
- High school: Morioka Minami (Morioka, Iwate)
- Playing career: 2010–2020

Career history

Playing
- 2010-2011: Akita Northern Happinets
- 2011-2013: Iwate Big Bulls
- 2013-2016: Aomori Wat's
- 2016-2017: Iwate Big Bulls
- 2018-2019: St-Iwate
- 2019-2020: Iwate Big Bulls

Coaching
- 2020-present: Iwate Big Bulls (asst)

Career highlights
- 2× bj League All-star games

Makoto Sawaguchi (澤口誠, born December 5, 1991) is a Japanese former professional basketball player who last played for the Iwate Big Bulls of the B.League in Japan. He was selected by the Akita Northern Happinets with the 9th overall pick in the 2010 bj League draft.

== Career statistics ==
Legend
GP	Games played	GS	Games started	MPG	Minutes per game
FG%	Field goal percentage	3P%	3-point field goal percentage	FT%	Free throw percentage
RPG	Rebounds per game	APG	Assists per game	SPG	Steals per game
BPG	Blocks per game	PPG	Points per game	**Bold**	Career high

Year	Team	GP	GS	MPG	FG%	3P%	FT%	RPG	APG	SPG	BPG	PPG
2010-11	Akita	48	2	12.4	.317	.288	.649	1.3	1.1	0.3	0	5.3
2011-12	Iwate	49	27	26.7	.327	.277	.765	2.6	1.5	0.7	0.1	9.7
2012-13	Iwate	50	6	11.2	.343	.277	.870	1.1	0.6	0.3	0.0	5.1
2013-14	Aomori	52	47	22.5	.350	.274	.656	2.5	2.4	0.5	0	7.6
2014-15	Aomori	51	26	14.5	.347	.281	.667	1.7	1.5	0.3	0	4.2
2015-16	Aomori	47	33	19.6	.434	.368	.748	1.9	2.4	0.7	0	7.9
2016-17	Iwate	58	48	25.3	.342	.211	.777	2.8	2.9	0.4	0.2	9.4
2019-20	Iwate	12		12.7	.310	.000	.706	1.6	1.6	0.6	0.1	3.2

== Gallery ==
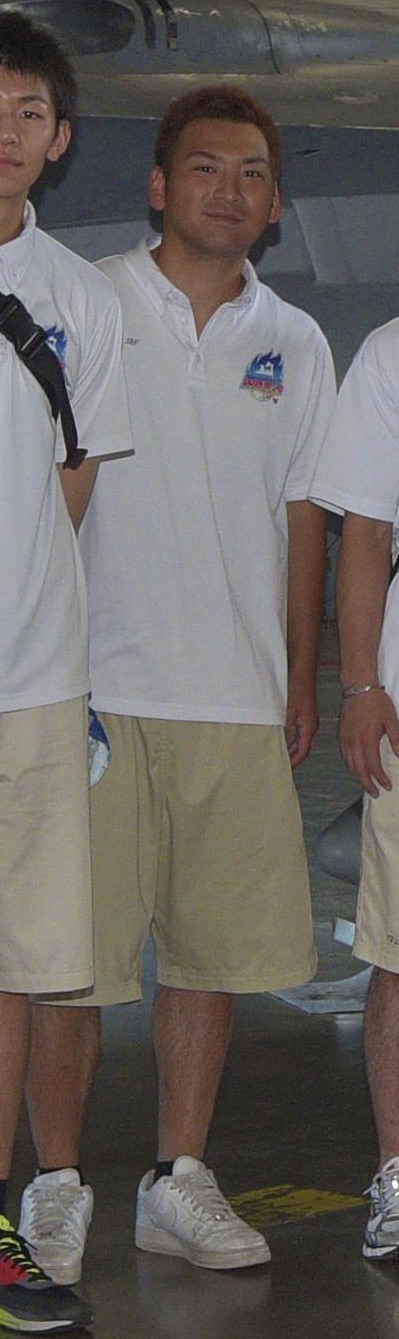

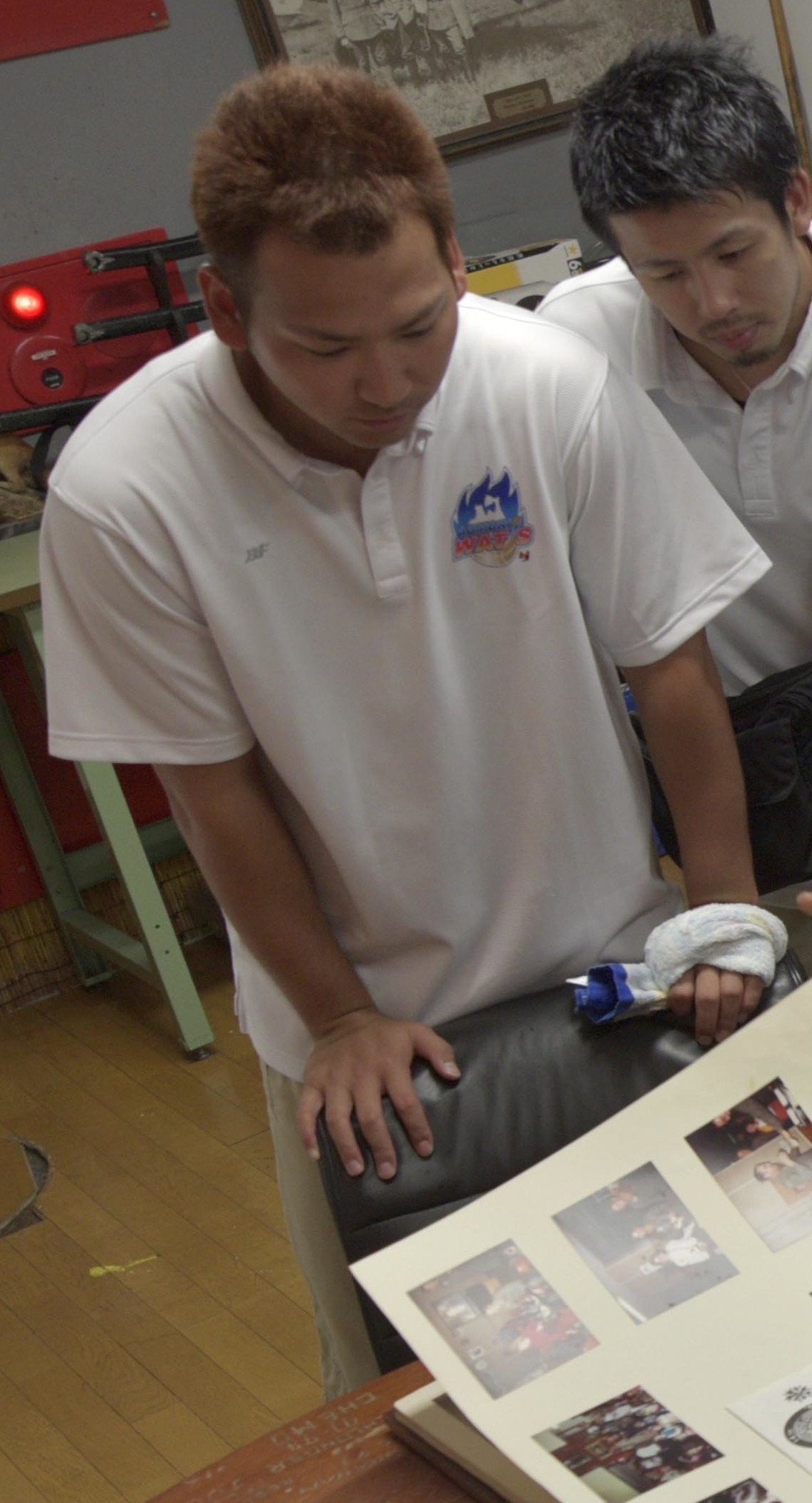
