= Nishinomiya City Central Gymnasium =

Sporting venue in Japan

Coordinates: 34°44′52.4″N 135°20′41″E

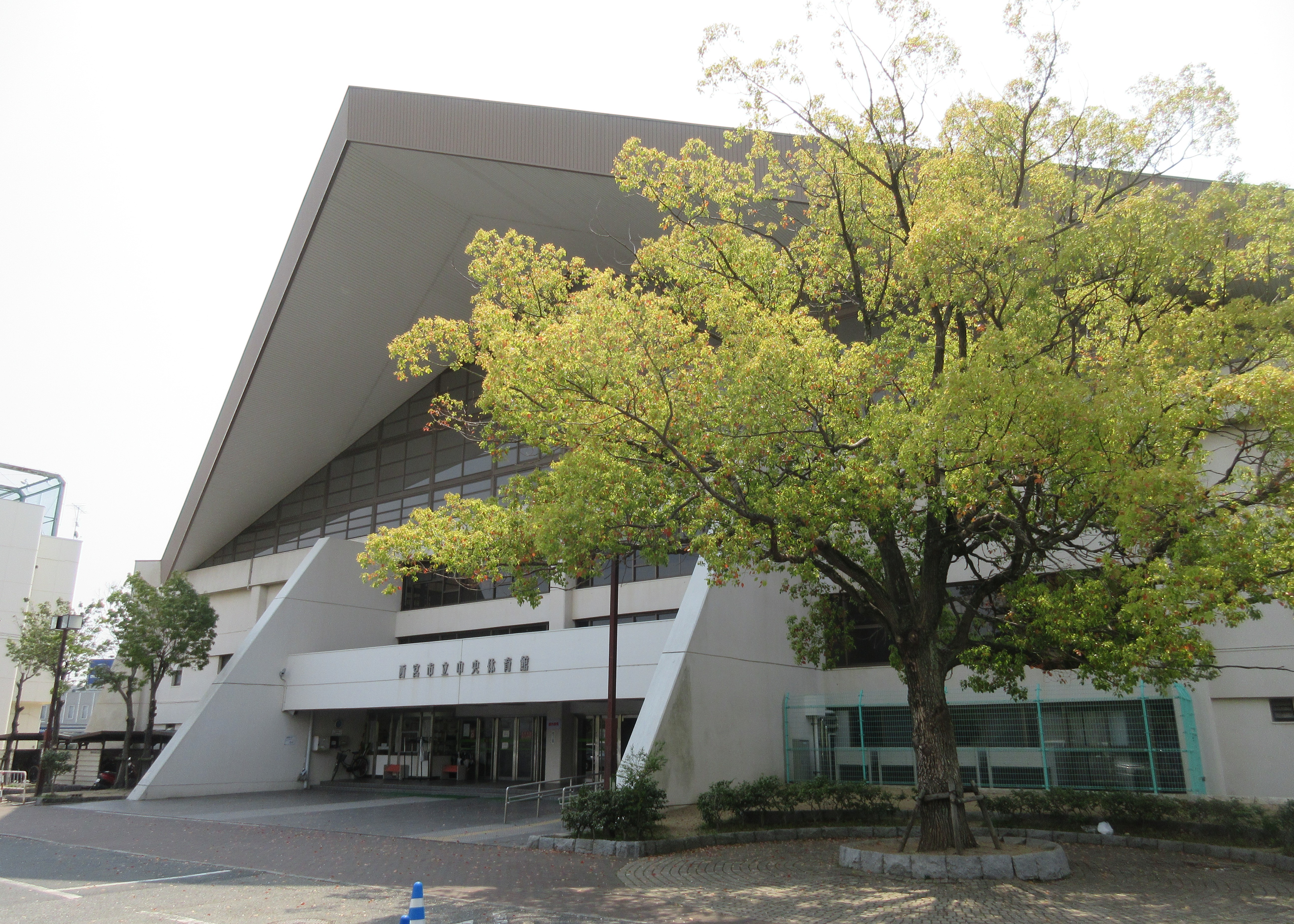
- Interactive map of Nishinomiya City Central Gymnasium
- Full name: Nishinomiya City Central Gymnasium
- Location: Nishinomiya, Hyogo, Japan
- Owner: Nishinomiya city
- Operator: Nishinomiya city
- Capacity: 2,356

Construction
- Opened: 1965
- Cost

Tenant
- Nishinomiya Storks

Website
- http://nsc-sports.jp/shisetu/chuuou

Nishinomiya City Central Gymnasium is an arena in Nishinomiya, Hyogo, Japan. It is the home arena of the Nishinomiya Storks of the B.League, Japan's professional basketball league.

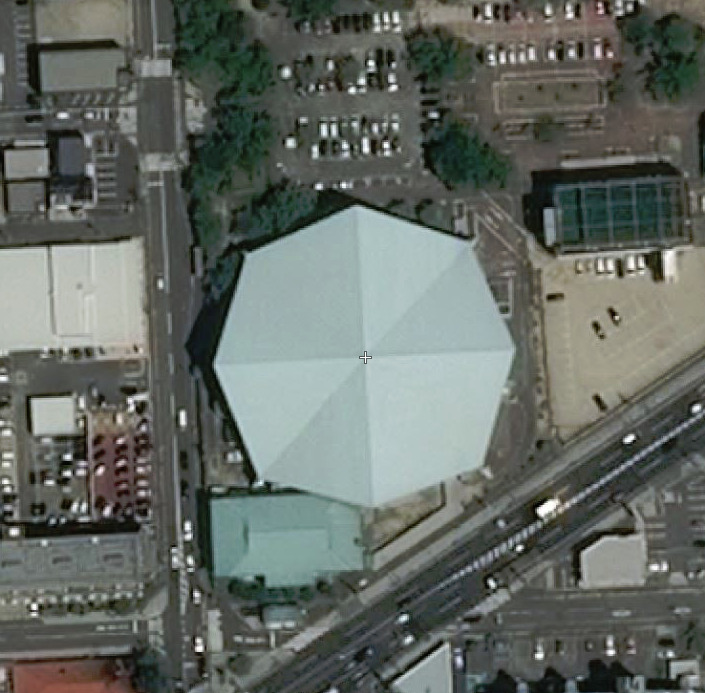
Satellite view
