= Masaki Hayamizu =

Japanese basketball coach

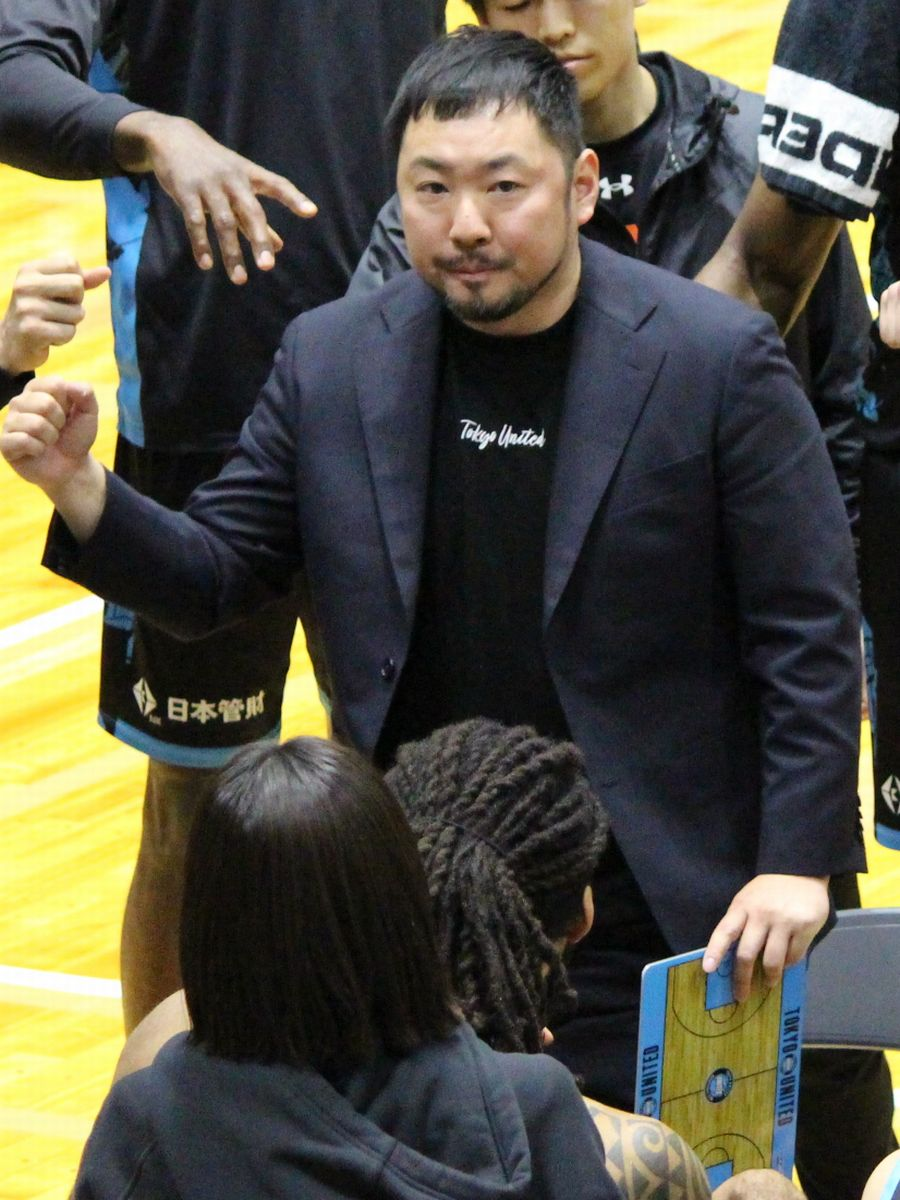

Tokyo United Basketball Club
- Position: Head coach
- League: B.League

Personal information
- Born: August 19, 1984 (age 42) Osaka Prefecture

Career information
- High school: Otsuka (Matsubara, Osaka)
- College: Nippon Sport Science University

Career history

Coaching
- 2014-2015: Tsukuba Robots (asst)
- 2015-2016: Tokyo Hachioji Trains
- 2016-2017: Tokyo Excellence
- 2017-2021: Tokyo Excellence (asst)
- 2021-2022: Tokyo Hachioji Bee Trains
- 2022-: Tokyo United Basketball Club

Masaki Hayamizu (早水 将希, Hayamizu Masaki) is the assistant coach of the Tokyo Excellence in the Japanese B.League.

== Head coaching record ==
Legend
Regular season	G	Games coached	W	Games won	L	Games lost	W–L %	Win–loss %
Playoffs	PG	Playoff games	PW	Playoff wins	PL	Playoff losses	PW–L %	Playoff win–loss %

Team	Year	G	W	L	W–L%	Finish	PG	PW	PL	PW–L%	Result
Tokyo Hachioji Trains	2015-16	36	17	19	.472	6th in NBDL	-	-	-	–	-
Tokyo Excellence	2016-17	60	22	38	.367	4th in B2 Central	-	-	-	–	Relegated to B3
