= Morioka Takaya Arena =

Sports arena in Morioka, Iwate, Japan

Coordinates: 39°41′27.1″N 141°7′13.4″E

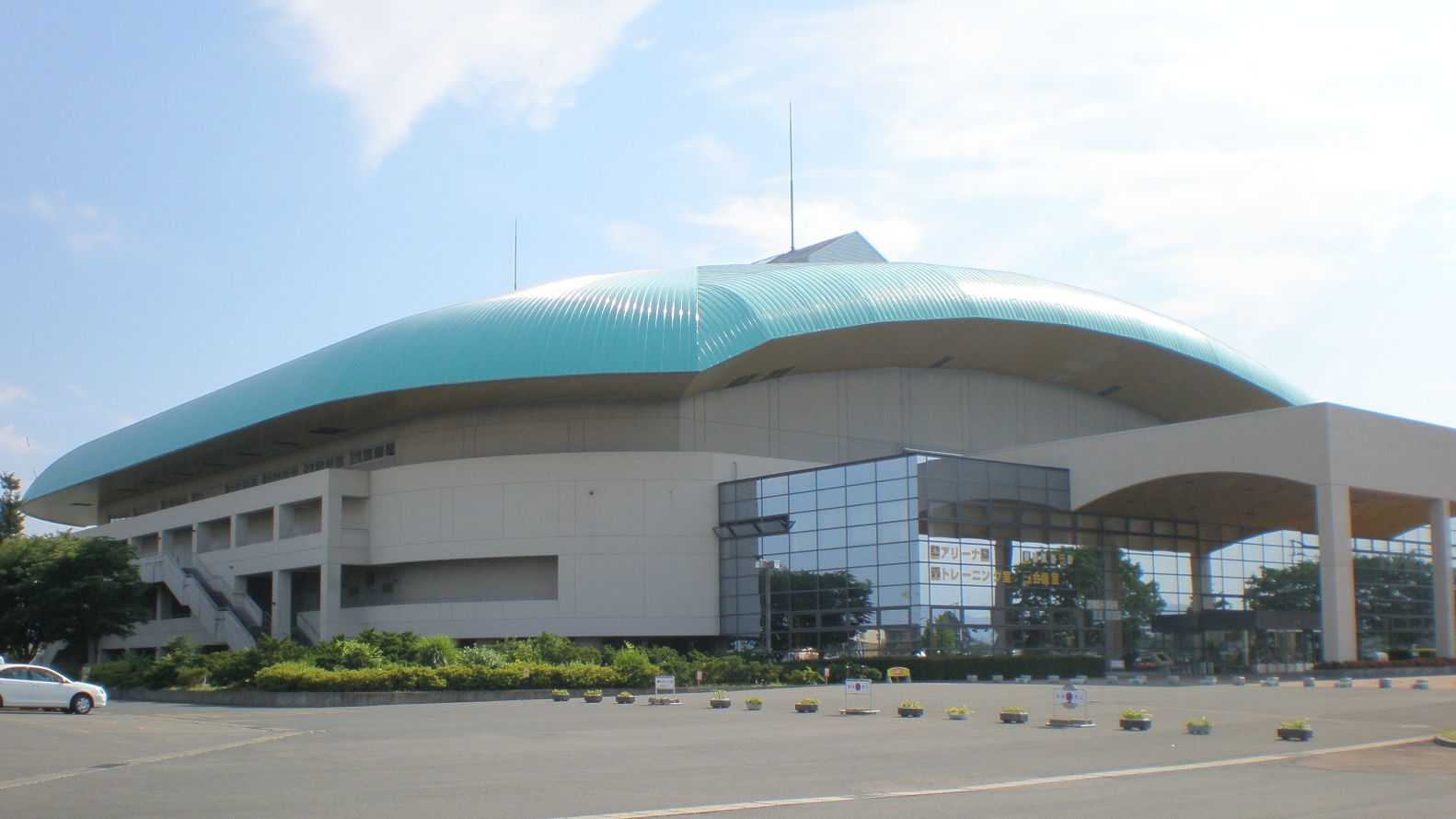
- Morioka Ice Arena in 2012

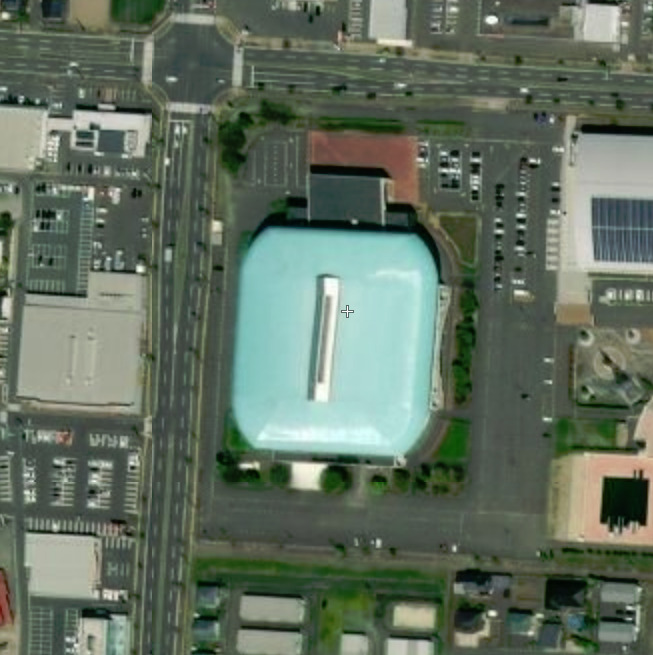
- Satellite view
- Interactive map of Morioka Takaya Arena
- Full name: Morioka City General Arena
- Former names: Morioka Ice Arena
- Location: Morioka, Iwate, Japan
- Owner: Morioka city
- Operator: Morioka city
- Capacity: 5,058
- Field size: 1,800 m^{2}

Construction
- Opened: 1989
- Renovated: 2018
- Cost

Tenant
- Iwate Big Bulls

Website
- http://www.morioka-taikyo.or.jp/shisetsu/mitsugi%20arena.html#arena

Morioka Takaya Arena is an arena in Morioka, Iwate, Japan. It is the home arena of the Iwate Big Bulls of the B.League, Japan's professional basketball league.
