= Ryuji Aoki =

Japanese basketball player (born 1998)

Ryuji Aoki 青木 龍史
No. 1 – Osaka Evessa
- Position: Point guard
- League: B.League

Personal information
- Born: March 19, 1998 (age 28) Aichi Prefecture, Japan
- Listed height: 183 cm (6 ft 0 in)
- Listed weight: 80 kg (176 lb)

Career information
- High school: Stevenson (Lincolnshire, Illinois)
- College: Rose-Hulman (2016–2019)
- Playing career: 2019–present

Career history
- 2019–2020: Shinshu Brave Warriors
- 2020–2021: Iwate Big Bulls
- 2021–present: Osaka Evessa

Ryuji Aoki (青木 龍史, あおきりゅうじ, Aoki Ryōji; born March 19, 1998) is a Japanese professional basketball player for Osaka Evessa of the B.League. He played college basketball for the Rose-Hulman Fightin' Engineers.

== Early life ==
Aoki was born in Aichi Prefecture, Japan. When he was in second grade, his family moved from Tokyo to the United States because his father, Moto, started a job for a pharmaceutical company. At the time, he could not speak English other than ‘yes,’ ‘no,’ ‘hello’ and ‘thank you.’ The first home of Aoki's family was in Buffalo Grove, Illinois and it had a basketball hoop in the driveway. Aoki shared that having kids over at his house every day to play basketball helped him in making friends and in improving his basketball and English-speaking skills. His family then moved to Long Grove, Illinois, where he grew up.

== High school career ==
Aoki attended Stevenson High School in Lincolnshire, Illinois and played for its varsity basketball team. In his junior year, he played alongside, Jalen Brunson, Connor Cashaw and Justin Smith, and won the 2015 Class 4A state championship. As a senior, he averaged 12.3 points, 1.9 rebounds, 1.4 assists and 1.0 steals per game, helping the Patriots finish the season with a 24–7 record.

== College career ==
Aoki attended Rose-Hulman Institute of Technology and played for the Fightin' Engineers. He made his collegiate debut on November 19, 2016, posting eight points, one assist and one steal against Birmingham–Southern College. On January 7, 2017, he scored a career-high 20 points in a loss to Manchester University. As a freshman, he averaged 7.9 points, 1.7 rebounds and 1.3 assists in 15.8 minutes per game.

On January 6, 2018, Aoki tallied a season-high 21 points in a win over Earlham College. As a sophomore, Aoki played in 27 games, including three starts, averaging 10.0 points, 1.4 rebounds and 0.9 assists in 15.8 minutes per game.

On January 9, 2019, Aoki registered a season-high 25 points in a victory against Franklin College. As a senior, he started in all 18 games that he appeared in, posting an average of 12.2 points, 2.8 rebounds and 2.2 assists in 26.9 minutes per game.

At the conclusion of Aoki's time in Rose-Hulman, he ranks near the top of a number of key categories in the program history, including sixth in all-time 3-point field goal percentage with 40.3 and seventeenth for 3-pointers made with 95. He made history as Heartland Collegiate Athletic Conference school's all-time leader in free throw accuracy with 138-of-148 or 93.2 percent. In his three years of college basketball, Aoki scored 641 points, grabbed 120 rebounds and dished out 89 assists, while helping the Fightin' Engineers go 48–31 overall.

== Professional career ==
=== Shinshu Brave Warriors (2019–2020) ===
On July 24, 2019, Aoki signed with the Shinshu Brave Warriors of the B.League as a “Special Designated Player.” He made his professional debut on September 28, against the Koshigaya Alphas. In his rookie season, Aoki averaged 0.7 points, 0.3 rebounds, 0.1 assists and 0.1 steals in 2.4 minutes over 18 games played.

=== Iwate Big Bulls (2020–2021) ===
On June 17, 2020, Aoki signed with the Iwate Big Bulls. On March 21, 2021, he logged a career-high 46 points with zero turnovers on 14-of-20 shooting from the field and 12-of-18 from three, against the Veltex Shizuoka, setting a B.League record for the most points scored in a game by a player, previously held by Kosuke Kanamaru of Seahorses Mikawa with 45 points. Aoki appeared in 31 games, including 24 starts, averaging 12.0 points, 2.5 rebounds, 1.2 assists and 0.5 steals in 21.1 minutes per game, while shooting 43.2 percent from the field and 41.6 percent from three.

=== Osaka Evessa (2021–present) ===
On July 7, 2021, Aoki signed with the Osaka Evessa.

== Personal life ==
Aoki was an academic all-conference selection at Stevenson High School, where he graduated with a 4.45 grade-point average (GPA) in 2016. He was also a part of the school's marching band.

Aoki earned a biomedical engineering degree from Rose-Hulman Institute of Technology in three years. He graduated with a 3.91 GPA in 2019. Out of the 6,000 student-athletes in NCAA Division III basketball, he was named to the 15-man 2019 Google Cloud Academic All-American. Aoki was a third-team selection and is the sixth player in program history to receive the honor.

Aoki cited high school teammate and NBA player Jalen Brunson as his role model and inspiration, who told him once that “magic is in the work.”
