= Biwajima Sports Center =

Arena in Nagoya, Aichi, Japan

Coordinates: 35°11′19.85″N 136°52′30.1″E

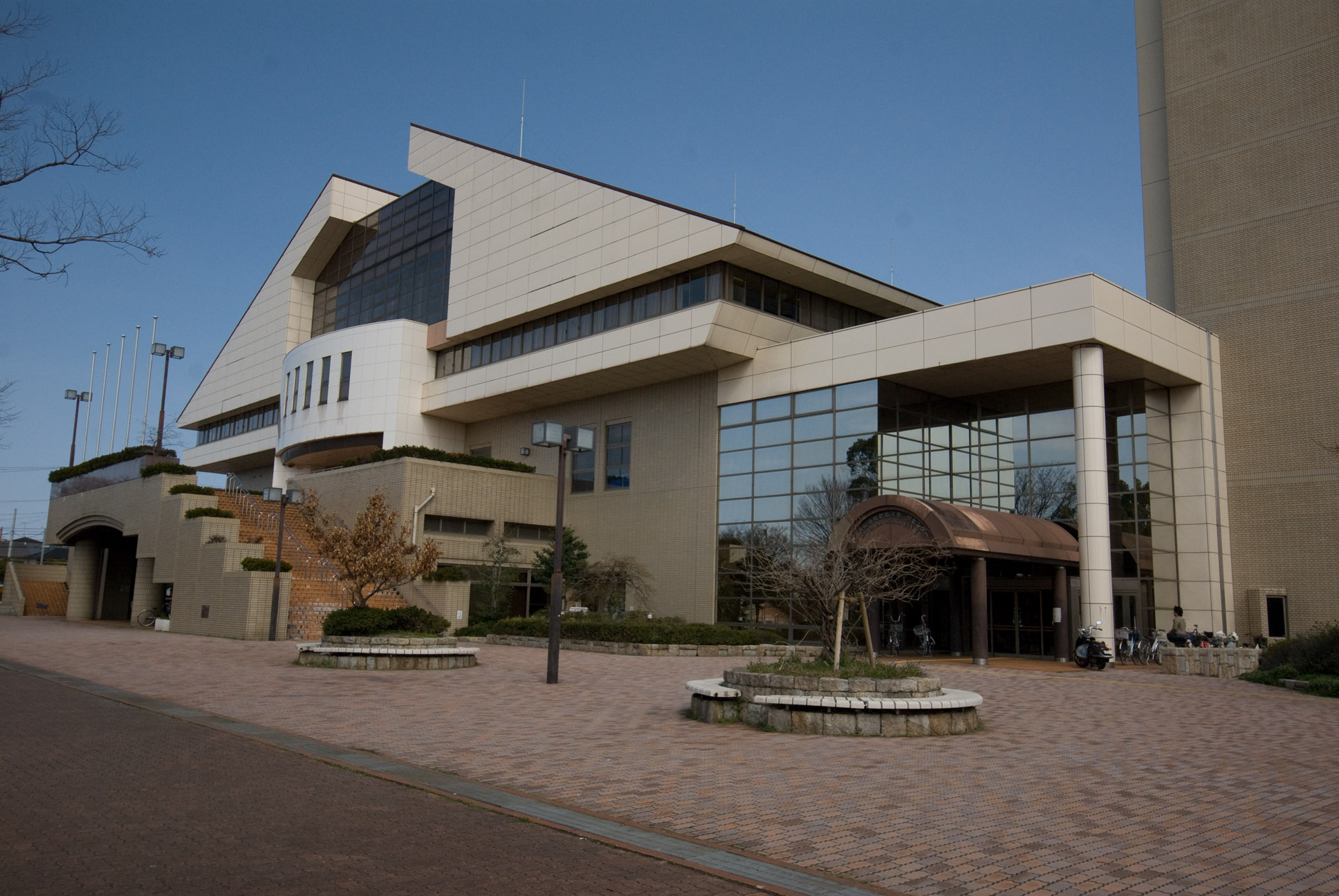
- Interactive map of Biwajima Sports Center
- Full name: Biwajima Sports Center
- Location: Nishi-ku, Nagoya, Japan
- Owner: Nagoya city
- Operator: Nagoya city
- Parking: 100 spaces + Yoshizuya parking

Construction
- Opened: 1987
- Cost

Tenant
- Toyotsu Fighting Eagles Nagoya

Website
- http://www.nespa.or.jp/shisetsu/biwajima_sc/

Biwajima Sports Center is an arena in Nagoya, Aichi, Japan. It is the home arena of the Toyotsu Fighting Eagles Nagoya of the B.League, Japan's professional basketball league.

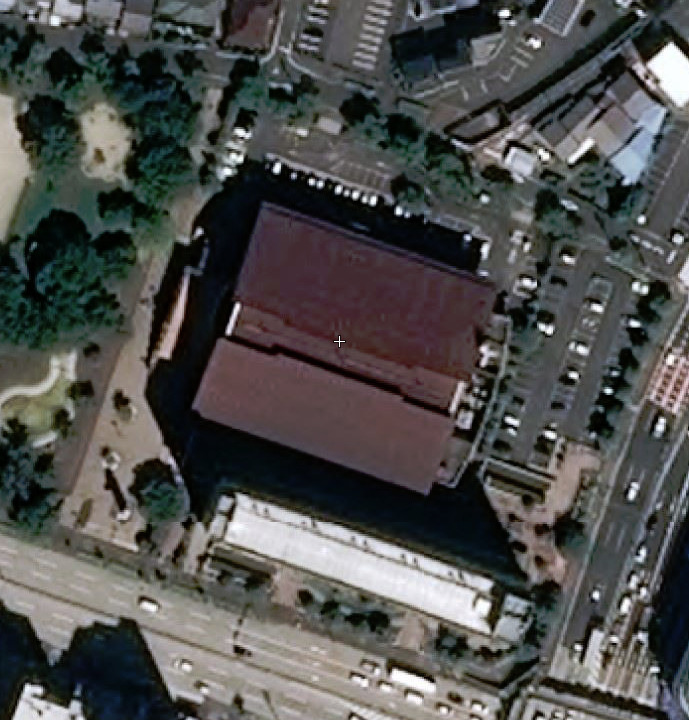
Satellite view
