= Yuto Otsuka (basketball, born 1990) =

Japanese basketball player

Yuto Otsuka 大塚勇人
No. 6 – Rizing Zephyr Fukuoka
- Position: Point Guard
- League: B.League

Personal information
- Born: April 3, 1990 (age 36) Niiza, Saitama, Japan
- Listed height: 5 ft 8 in (1.73 m)
- Listed weight: 152 lb (69 kg)

Career information
- High school: Fukuoka University Ohori (Fukuoka, Fukuoka)
- College: Waseda University
- Playing career: 2013–present

Career history
- 2013–2017: Toyotsu Fighting Eagles Nagoya
- 2017-2018: Nishinomiya Storks
- 2018: Akita Northern Happinets
- 2018-2019: Nishinomiya Storks
- 2019-2020: Aomori Wat's
- 2020-2021: Bambitious Nara
- 2021-present: Rizing Zephyr Fukuoka

Career highlights
- NBDL MVP (2015-16); 2x NBDL Best Five (2014-16); NBDL Assist leader (2014-15); Japanese Junior High School Champion (2008)

Yuto Otsuka (大塚 勇人, Ōtsuka Yūto; born April 3, 1990) is a Japanese professional basketball player who plays for the Rizing Zephyr Fukuoka of the B.League in Japan.

== Career statistics ==
Legend
GP	Games played	GS	Games started	MPG	Minutes per game
FG%	Field goal percentage	3P%	3-point field goal percentage	FT%	Free throw percentage
RPG	Rebounds per game	APG	Assists per game	SPG	Steals per game
BPG	Blocks per game	PPG	Points per game	**Bold**	Career high

=== Regular season ===
Year	Team	GP	GS	MPG	FG%	3P%	FT%	RPG	APG	SPG	BPG	PPG
2013-14	Toyotsu	30	4	20.3	.465	.404	.774	2.4	3.9	1.6	0.0	5.9
2014-15	Toyotsu	30	18	20.6	.411	.375	.577	2.4	3.9	1.7	0.1	6.5
2015-16	Toyotsu	36	36	25.6	.401	.342	.671	3.3	4.9	1.8	0.1	8.4
2016–17	FE Nagoya	48	40	27.1	.418	.283	.734	3.1	4.5	1.6	0.1	7.7
2017–18	Nishinomiya/Akita	43	16	13.9	.401	.383	.757	1.2	2.6	0.8	0.0	3.7
2018-19	Nishinomiya	41	0	13.46	.437	.302	.849	1.3	1.8	1.10	0.02	4.8
2019-20	Aomori	46	4	16.1	.431	.345	.623	1.7	3.1	1.1	0.0	6.5

=== Playoffs ===
Year	Team	GP	GS	MPG	FG%	3P%	FT%	RPG	APG	SPG	BPG	PPG
2017-18	Akita	5	0	8.50	.318	.250	.400	1.6	2.0	0.4	0	3.6

=== Early cup games ===
Year	Team	GP	GS	MPG	FG%	3P%	FT%	RPG	APG	SPG	BPG	PPG
2017	Nishinomiya	3	1	15.49	.250	.000	.750	1.7	1.0	1.0	0	3.0
2018	Nishinomiya	1	0	6.29	.333	.000	.000	2.0	0	0	0	2.0
2019	Aomori	2	1	20.59	.556	1.000	.667	1.0	4.0	2.0	0	8.0
