= Dan Weiss (basketball) =

American-born Japanese basketball player and coach

Dynamic Alternatives International
- Position: Head coach

Personal information
- Born: February 28, 1966 (age 60) San Jose, California
- Listed height: 206 cm (6 ft 9 in)
- Listed weight: 100 kg (220 lb)

Career information
- College: Santa Clara (1984–1988); Hitotsubashi University

Career history

Playing
- ?: Galatasaray S.K. (men's basketball)
- 1989–?: Toyota Tsusho
- ?: Toyota Pacers
- 2001–2002: Bosch Blue Winds
- ?: Excellence

Coaching
- 2009–2013: Tokyo Excellence
- 2014–present: Dynamic Alternatives International

Career highlights

Daniel A Weiss (ワイス団, Waisu Dan; born 28 February 1966) is a US-born former Japanese professional basketball player and the former Head coach of the Tokyo Excellence.

== Head coaching record ==
Legend
Regular season	G	Games coached	W	Games won	L	Games lost	W–L %	Win–loss %
Playoffs	PG	Playoff games	PW	Playoff wins	PL	Playoff losses	PW–L %	Playoff win–loss %

Team	Year	G	W	L	W–L%	Finish	PG	PW	PL	PW–L%	Result
