= Takaki Ishida =

Japanese basketball coach

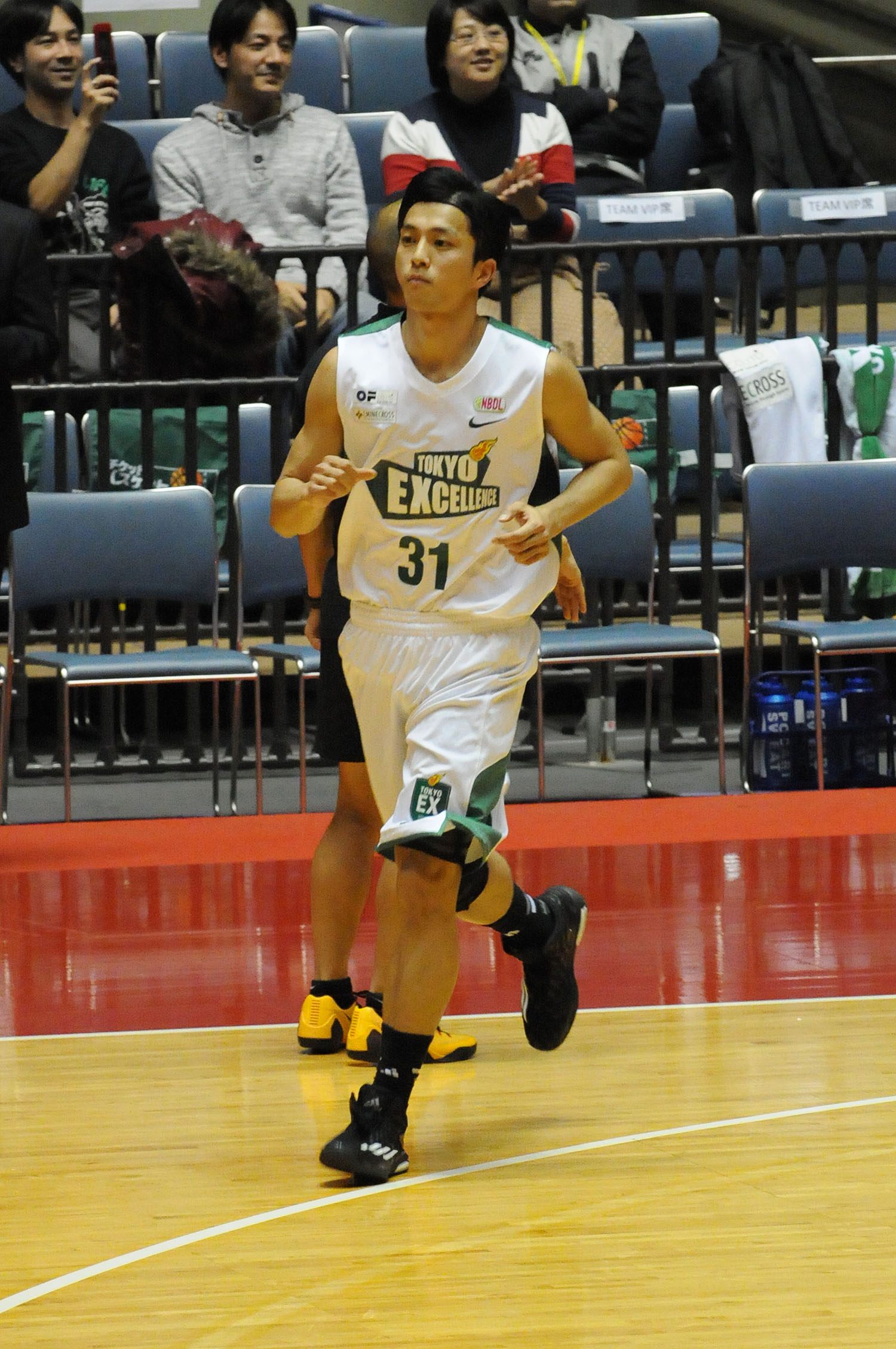

Yokohama Excellence
- Position: Head coach
- League: B.League

Personal information
- Born: September 25, 1982 (age 44) Mito, Ibaraki
- Listed height: 187 cm (6 ft 2 in)
- Listed weight: 82 kg (181 lb)

Career information
- High school: Hitachi Daiichi (Hitachi, Ibaraki)
- College: Keio University
- Playing career: 2005–2017

Career history

Playing
- 2005-2009: Toyota Alvark
- 2011-2013: Chiba Jets
- 2013-2017: Yokohama Excellence

Coaching
- 2017-: Yokohama Excellence

Takaki Ishida (石田剛規, Ishida Takaki) is a Japanese basketball coach who is the head coach for the Yokohama Excellence of the B.League. He played college basketball for Keio University. He was selected by the Chiba Jets with the 4th overall pick in the 2011 bj League draft.

== Career ==
Ishida joined Alvark Tokyo in 2005.

In 2009, he left the team and retired from his playing career. That same year, he transitioned into acting with his appearance in the July season of the Monday 9 drama, Buzzer Beat ~Cliffhanger Heroes~. He later mentioned on a TV program that he “was working as an actor.”

In 2010, he joined the club team “Excellence” and aimed to make a competitive comeback.

In 2011, he was selected 4th overall in the bj-league draft by the Chiba Jets.

Ishida was also selected for the 2012 bj-league All-Star Game in Saitama through the Facebook booster voting slot. For Ishida, this was effectively his second All-Star appearance, following his guest participation in the three-point contest at the 2010 bj-league All-Star Game held at Miyagi Grandy 21 Sekisui Heim Arena, which was tied to his role in the drama *Buzzer Beat*.

In the 2013 off-season, he transferred to Yokohama Excellence in the NBDL.

In the 2017 off-season, he retired from playing and was appointed head coach.

== Head coaching record ==
Legend
Regular season	G	Games coached	W	Games won	L	Games lost	W–L %	Win–loss %
Playoffs	PG	Playoff games	PW	Playoff wins	PL	Playoff losses	PW–L %	Playoff win–loss %

Team	Year	G	W	L	W–L%	Finish	PG	PW	PL	PW–L%	Result
Tokyo Excellence	2017-18	42	28	14	.667	3rd in B3	20	12	8	.600	3rd in Final stage
