= Shunsuke Todo =

Basketball coach

Shusuke Todo
Kobe Storks
- Position: Head coach
- League: B.League

Personal information
- Born: June 8, 1977 (age 49) Sapporo, Hokkaido

Career information
- High school: Moiwa (Sapporo, Hokkaido)
- College: Rowan University
- Coaching career: 2004–present

Career history

Coaching
- 2004-2005: Nagoya Gakuin HS (asst)
- 2005-2009: Hitachi SunRockers (asst)
- 2010-2011: Japan (asst)
- 2012-2013: Denso Iris (asst)
- 2013-2015: Osaka Evessa
- 2015-2017: Toyota Antelopes (asst)
- 2017-2019: Earthfriends Tokyo Z (associate)
- 2019-2021: Earthfriends Tokyo Z
- 2023-2024: Gunma Crane Thunders (asst)
- 2024-2025: Kobe Storks (asst)
- 2025-: Kobe Storks

Shunsuke Todo (東頭俊典, Tōdō Shunsuke) is the head coach of the Kobe Storks in the Japanese B.League.

== Head coaching record ==
Legend
Regular season	G	Games coached	W	Games won	L	Games lost	W–L %	Win–loss %
Playoffs	PG	Playoff games	PW	Playoff wins	PL	Playoff losses	PW–L %	Playoff win–loss %

Team	Year	G	W	L	W–L%	Finish	PG	PW	PL	PW–L%	Result
Osaka Evessa	2013-14	52	24	28	.462	6th in Bj Western	3	1	2	.333	Lost in 1st round
Osaka Evessa	2014-15	52	28	24	.538	5th in Bj Western	2	0	2	.000	Lost in 1st round
