= Taizo Kawabe =

Japanese basketball player and coach

Toyotsu Fighting Eagles Nagoya
- Position: Head coach
- League: B.League

Personal information
- Born: May 13, 1982 (age 44) Chūō-ku, Osaka
- Listed height: 190 cm (6 ft 3 in)
- Listed weight: 86 kg (190 lb)

Career information
- High school: Konan (Ashiya, Hyogo)
- College: Konan University
- Playing career: 2005–2014

Career history

Playing
- 2005-09: Mitsubishi Electric
- 2009-12: Kyoto Hannaryz
- 2012-13: Osaka Evessa
- 2013-14: Shimane Susanoo Magic

Coaching
- 2017-19: Toyotsu Fighting Eagles Nagoya (asst)
- 2019-present: Toyotsu Fighting Eagles Nagoya

Career highlights
- Kansai College Basketball League Scoring Leader

Taizo Kawabe (川辺泰三, Kawabe Taizou) is the head coach of the Toyotsu Fighting Eagles Nagoya in the Japanese B.League. He played college basketball for Konan University. Kawabe was drafted second overall by the Kyoto Hannaryz in the 2009 bj league draft.

== Career statistics ==
Legend
GP	Games played	GS	Games started	MPG	Minutes per game
FG%	Field goal percentage	3P%	3-point field goal percentage	FT%	Free throw percentage
RPG	Rebounds per game	APG	Assists per game	SPG	Steals per game
BPG	Blocks per game	PPG	Points per game	**Bold**	Career high

=== Regular season ===
Year	Team	GP	GS	MPG	FG%	3P%	FT%	RPG	APG	SPG	BPG	PPG
2007-14	Nagoya/Kyoto/Osaka/Shimane	259		17.2	.408	.347	.756	1.6	1.0	0.4	0.0	5.7

== Head coaching record ==
Legend
Regular season	G	Games coached	W	Games won	L	Games lost	W–L %	Win–loss %
Playoffs	PG	Playoff games	PW	Playoff wins	PL	Playoff losses	PW–L %	Playoff win–loss %

Team	Year	G	W	L	W–L%	Finish	PG	PW	PL	PW–L%	Result
FE Nagoya	2019-20	-	-	-	–	in B2 Central	-	-	-	–	-
