= Chubu Gakuin University =

Private university in Seki, Japan

Coordinates: 35°27′30.9″N 136°53′53.1″E

- 中部学院大学
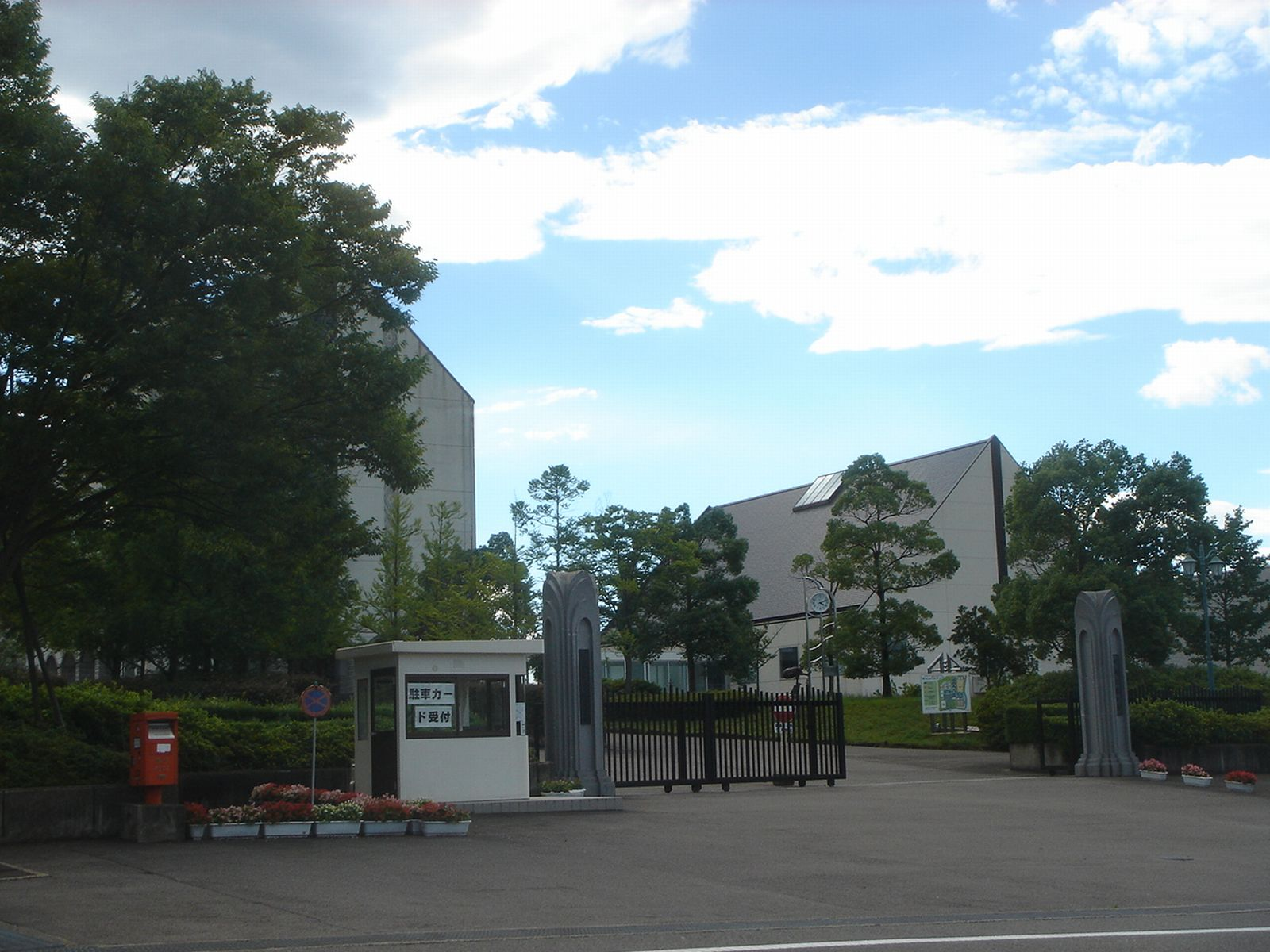
- Chubu Gakuin University in 2007
- Motto: The fear of the Lord is the beginning of knowledge --- Proverbs 1.7.
- Type: Private
- Location: Seki, Gifu, Japan
- Website: http://www.chubu-gu.ac.jp

Chubu Gakuin University (中部学院大学, Chūbu gakuin daigaku) is a private university at Seki, Gifu, Japan. The predecessor of the school was founded in 1918.
