= Takarazuka City General Gymnasium =

Sports arena in Japan

Coordinates: 34°48′8.6″N 135°21′46.3″E

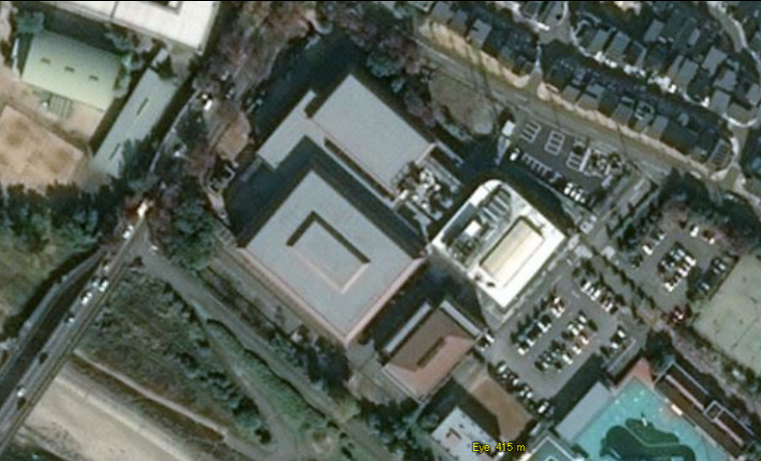
- Interactive map of Takarazuka City General Gymnasium
- Full name: Takarazuka Municipal Sports Facilities General Gymnasium
- Location: Takarazuka, Hyogo, Japan
- Owner: Takarazuka city
- Operator: Takarazuka city

Construction
- Cost

Website
- https://tspf.hyogo.jp/shisetu/sougou/

Takarazuka City General Gymnasium is an arena in Takarazuka, Hyogo, Japan.
