= Ryuji Watanabe =

Ryuji Watanabe 渡邊 竜二
Toyotsu Fighting Eagles Nagoya
- Position: General manager
- League: B.League

Personal information
- Born: April 28, 1971 (age 55) Joshin, Nishi-ku, Nagoya, Aichi

Career information
- High school: Aichi Institute of Technology Meiden (Nagoya, Aichi)
- College: Nihon University

Career history

Playing
- 1993-2002: Toyotsu Fighting Eagles Nagoya

Coaching
- 2002-2019: Toyotsu Fighting Eagles Nagoya

Career highlights
- Japanese High School Champions

Ryuji Watanabe (渡邊 竜二, Watanabe Ryuji) is the general manager of the Toyotsu Fighting Eagles Nagoya in the Japanese B.League.

== Head coaching record ==
Legend
Regular season	G	Games coached	W	Games won	L	Games lost	W–L %	Win–loss %
Playoffs	PG	Playoff games	PW	Playoff wins	PL	Playoff losses	PW–L %	Playoff win–loss %

Team	Year	G	W	L	W–L%	Finish	PG	PW	PL	PW–L%	Result
Toyotsu	2007-08	16	14	2	.875	2nd	1	0	1	.000	4th place
Toyotsu	2008-09	14	14	0	1.000	1st	2	2	0	1.000	JBL2 Champions
Toyotsu	2009-10	21	21	0	1.000	1st	2	2	0	1.000	JBL2 Champions
Toyotsu	2010-11	22	22	0	1.000	1st	-	-	-	–	-
Toyotsu	2011-12	27	24	3	.889	1st	2	2	0	1.000	JBL2 Champions
Toyotsu	2012-13	32	22	10	.688	3rd	-	-	-	–	5th
Toyotsu	2013-14	32	30	2	.938	1st	2	1	1	.500	Runners-up in NBDL
Toyotsu	2014-15	32	30	2	.938	1st	2	1	1	.500	3rd place
Toyotsu	2015-16	36	32	4	.889	1st	2	1	1	.500	Runners-up in NBDL
FE Nagoya	2016-17	60	42	18	.700	2nd in B2 Central	-	-	-	–	-
FE Nagoya	2017-18	60	39	21	.650	1st in B2 Central	4	0	4	.000	4th in B2
FE Nagoya	2018-19	60	41	19	.683	2nd in B2 Central	-	-	-	–	5th in B2
