= Komagatani Sports Park Gymnasium =

Arena in Sanda, Hyogo, Japan

Coordinates: 34°54′40.6″N 135°10′48.8″E

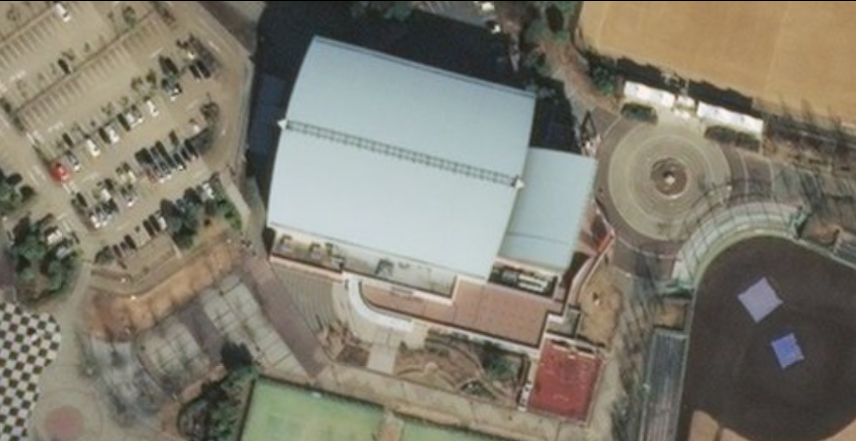
- Interactive map of Komagatani Sports Park Gymnasium
- Full name: Sanda City Komagatani Sports Park Gymnasium
- Location: Sanda, Hyogo, Japan
- Owner: Sanda city
- Operator: Sanda city

Construction
- Cost

Website
- http://www.sanda-sports.jp/komagatani/

Komagatani Sports Park Gymnasium is an arena in Sanda, Hyogo, Japan.
