= Akitomo Takeno =

Japanese basketball player and coach

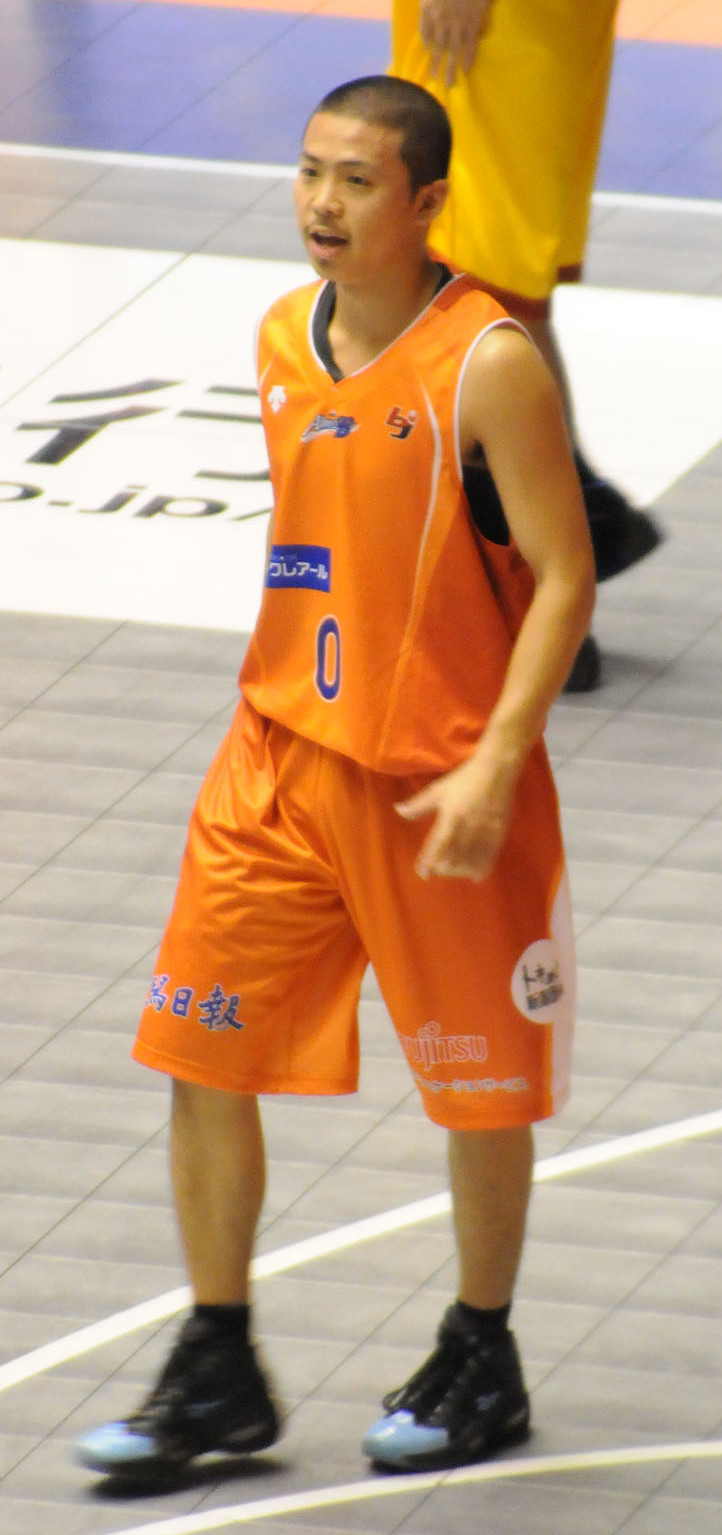
- Takeno at Akita Prefectural Gymnasium

Osaka Evessa
- Position: Assistant coach
- League: B.League

Personal information
- Born: November 23, 1985 (age 40) Minami-ku, Fukuoka, Japan
- Listed height: 5 ft 8 in (1.73 m)
- Listed weight: 143 lb (65 kg)

Career information
- High school: Fukuoka University Ohori (Fukuoka, Japan)
- College: Daito Bunka University
- Playing career: 2007–2017
- Coaching career: 2017–present

Career history

Playing
- 2007–2008: Rizing Fukuoka
- 2008–2010: Niigata Albirex BB
- 2010–2014: Rizing Fukuoka
- 2014–2016: Akita Northern Happinets
- 2016–2017: Nishinomiya Storks

Coaching
- 2017–2019: Nishinomiya Storks (asst.)
- 2019–present: Osaka Evessa (asst.)

Career highlights
- 2× bj league 3 Point Field Goal Percentage Leader (2008, 2010); 2× bj league All-star (2009, 2013)

Akitomo Takeno (竹野 明倫, Takeno Akitomo; born November 23, 1985), nicknamed AT, is a current professional basketball assistant coach for Osaka Evessa in Japan. He was selected by the Niigata Albirex BB with the fifth overall pick in the 2008 bj League draft. He shortened his career due to a torn ACL in his left knee in 2015.

== Career statistics ==
Legend
GP	Games played	GS	Games started	MPG	Minutes per game
FG%	Field goal percentage	3P%	3-point field goal percentage	FT%	Free throw percentage
RPG	Rebounds per game	APG	Assists per game	SPG	Steals per game
BPG	Blocks per game	PPG	Points per game	**Bold**	Career high

=== Regular season ===
*	Led the league

Year	Team	GP	GS	MPG	FG%	3P%	FT%	RPG	APG	SPG	BPG	PPG
2007-08	Fukuoka	20	0	17.7	**44.6**	41.5	81.3	0.4	2.1	0.9	0	8.1
2008-09	Niigata	**52**	20	25.2	39.7	41.3	89.4	1.1	3.2	1	0	**13**
2009-10	Niigata	51	33	23.0	35.2	26.9	85.5	1.3	2.9	0.1	0.1	8.6
2010-11	Fukuoka	50	43	32.0	43.6	**46.0**	81.3	1.7	3.7	**1.2**	0.1	10.2
2011-12	Fukuoka	47	43	**32.1**	38.4	35.5	79.1	1.8	2.9	1	**0.1**	11
2012-13	Fukuoka	49	47	29.2	40.8	31.7	86.9	1.5	3.4	0.9	0.1	9.8
2013-14	Fukuoka	51	**48**	22.4	39.3	35.2	91.2	1.2	2.6	0.9	0.1	7.6
2014-15	Akita	35	35	26.1	44.4	42.0	**93.0**	**2.2**	**4.3**	0.7	0.1	9.7
2015-16	Akita	20	20	19.4	31.9	37.3	72.0	1.6	2.9	0.6	0.0	5.5
2016-17	Nishinomiya	24	19	25.0	38.7	37.0	81.1	2.4	3.1	0.7	0.0	7.9
Career		399		26.1	39.8%	37.2%	85.4%	1.5	3.2	0.9	0.1	9.5

=== Playoffs ===
Year	Team	GP	GS	MPG	FG%	3P%	FT%	RPG	APG	SPG	BPG	PPG
2010-11	Fukuoka	4		37.3	.415	.267	1.000	2.8	4.0	2.8	0.0	12.0
2011-12	Fukuoka	2		27.5	.111	.111	.000	0.0	1.0	1.0	0.0	2.5
