= Iwate Big Bulls =

- Division: Second
- Leagues: B.League
- Founded: 2010
- History: bj league (2011–2016); B.League (2016–present)
- Arena: Morioka Takaya Arena
- Capacity: 5,058
- Location: Morioka, Iwate
- Main sponsor: Kaneman Pachinko
- President: (Japan) Satoshi Mizuno
- General manager: Shigeru Shinohara
- Head coach: Yukinori Suzuki
- Ownership: Tatsuzawa Gakkan
- Website: bigbulls.jp
Home	Away

The Iwate Big Bulls (岩手ビッグブルズ, Iwate Bigguburuzu) are a Japanese professional basketball team based in Morioka, Iwate Prefecture. The team competes in the B.League One, the second division of the B.League, as a member of the Northern Conference.

The team's name is a reference to Iwate being the largest prefecture in Honshu, and cattle being a well-known symbol of the region.

== Roster ==
Iwate Big Bulls roster
Players
Coaches

Pos.	No.	Nat.	Name	Ht.	Age
PG	0	(Japan)	Ayumu Osawa
PG	2	(Japan)	Harumichi Ishikawa
PG	3	(Japan)	Ria Otsubo
PG	6	(South Korea)	Heyong-jun Jeon
PG	8	(Japan)	Masato Tsukino
SF	10	(Japan)	Takumi Nihira
SG	13	(Japan)	Shuhei Komatsu
PF	14	(Japan)	Kakeru Akimoto
SF	15	(Japan)	Jun Taniguchi
SF	22	(Japan)	Keijiro Monma
PF	25	(Benin)	Muusa Dama
PG	30	(Japan)	Toshiki Yokogawa (C)
SG	31	(Japan)	Keisuke Takabatake
SF	32	(Japan)	Hiroki Usui
C	–	(Puerto Rico)	Arnaldo Toro	2.03 m (6 ft 8 in)	28 – 28 October 1997

Head coach

- Yukinori Suzuki

Assistant coach(es)

- Yuma Yoshida
- Yuki Suzuki

Legend

- (C) Team captain
- Injured

- Roster
Updated: 1 January 2026

== Notable players ==
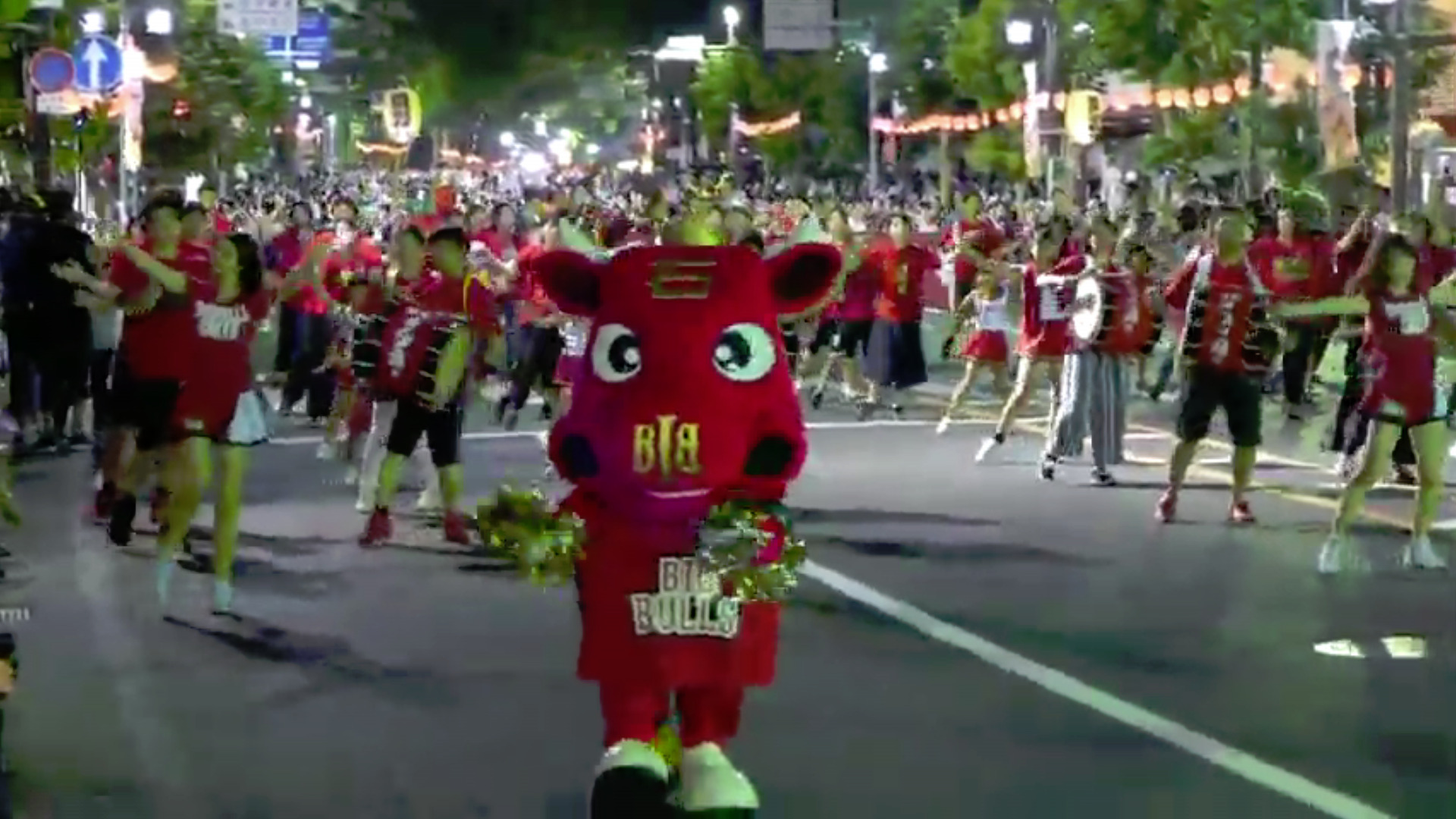
Bulls at Sansa Festival

- Wayne Arnold
- Lawrence Blackledge
- Jamal Boykin
- Brian Carlwell
- Tatsunori Fujie
- Alandise Harris
- Shota Onodera
- Gyno Pomare
- Patrick Sanders
- Makoto Sawaguchi
- Samuel Jr. Sawaji
- Dillion Sneed
- Noriyuki Sugasawa
- Hirohisa Takada
- Kenichi Takahashi
- Jahmar Thorpe

== Coaches ==
- Vlaikidis Vlasios (2011–12)
- Shinji Tomiyama
- Dai Oketani
- Geoffrey Katsuhisa
- Yasunori Ueda
- Donte Hill
- Osamu Okada (es)
- Yuma Yoshida
- Koji Nagata

== Arenas ==
- Morioka Takaya Arena
- Iwate Prefectural Gymnasium
- Kitakami General Gymnasium
- Sea Arena
- Dream Arena Takata
- U Dome
- Hanamaki City General Gymnasium
- Z Arena
- Kamaishi Citizens Gymnasium
- Kuji Citizens Gymnasium
- Takizawa General Park Gymnasium
- Ninohe City General Sports Center
- Kuzumaki Town Social Gymnasium
