= Fighting Eagles Nagoya =

Japanese professional basketball team

- Conference: Western
- Division: First
- Leagues: B.League
- Founded: 1957
- History: Toyota Tsusho Fighting Eagles; Toyotsu Fighting Eagles Nagoya
- Arena: Biwajima Sports Center
- Location: Nagoya, Aichi
- Main sponsor: NTP Group
- Team manager: Ryuji Watanabe
- Head coach: Taizo Kawabe
- Ownership: Toyota Tsusho
- Championships: 1
- Website: fightingeagles.jp
Home	Away

The Fighting Eagles Nagoya (ファイティングイーグルス名古屋, Faitinguīgurusu Nagoya) are a Japanese professional basketball team based in Nagoya. The Fighting Eagles compete in the B.League One, the second division of the B.League, as a member of the Western Conference.

== Roster ==
Fighting Eagles Nagoya roster
Players
Coaches

Pos.	No.	Nat.	Name
F	0	(United States)	Jamorko Pickett	2.06 m (6 ft 9 in)	28 – 24 December 1997
G	1	(United States)	Mark Burton	1.82 m (6 ft 0 in)	28 – 30 January 1998
PG	3	(Japan)	Narito Namizato	1.72 m (5 ft 8 in)	37 – 7 August 1989
SG	6	(Japan)	Tyrell Taku-Youngblood	1.84 m (6 ft 0 in)	25 – 6 April 2001
F	7	(Japan)	Kazuki Miyamoto	1.96 m (6 ft 5 in)	27 – 17 June 1999
PG	11	(Japan)	Kaito Ishikawa	1.70 m (5 ft 7 in)	35 – 30 November 1990
SF	12	(Japan)	Reiya Nozaki	1.85 m (6 ft 1 in)	31 – 8 September 1995
G	13	(Japan)	Hiromu Nakamura	1.77 m (5 ft 10 in)	28 – 29 November 1997
G/F	16	(Japan)	Ryuji Mitsuo	1.92 m (6 ft 4 in)	25 – 26 February 2001
SG	18	(Japan)	Takuya Soma	1.82 m (6 ft 0 in)	35 – 5 July 1991
PG	21	(Japan)	Takaya Sasayama	1.80 m (5 ft 11 in)	33 – 15 February 1993
F	22	(United States)	Jeremy Jones	2.01 m (6 ft 7 in)	30 – 11 June 1996
G/F	25	(Japan)	Daichi Kuzuhara	1.89 m (6 ft 2 in)	30 – 5 February 1996

Head coach

Taizo Kawabe

Legend

- (C) Team captain
- Injured

- Roster

== Notable players ==
- Solomon Alabi
- Paul Butorac
- Rodney Carney
- Andrew Feeley
- Jerald Honeycutt
- Herbert Hill
- Yuto Otsuka
- John Pierce
- Lamar Rice
- Garrett Stutz
- Scott VanderMeer
- Dan Weiss

== Arenas ==
- Biwajima Sports Center
- Nagoya City Chikusa Sports Center
- Nagoya City Nakamura Sports Center

== Gallery ==
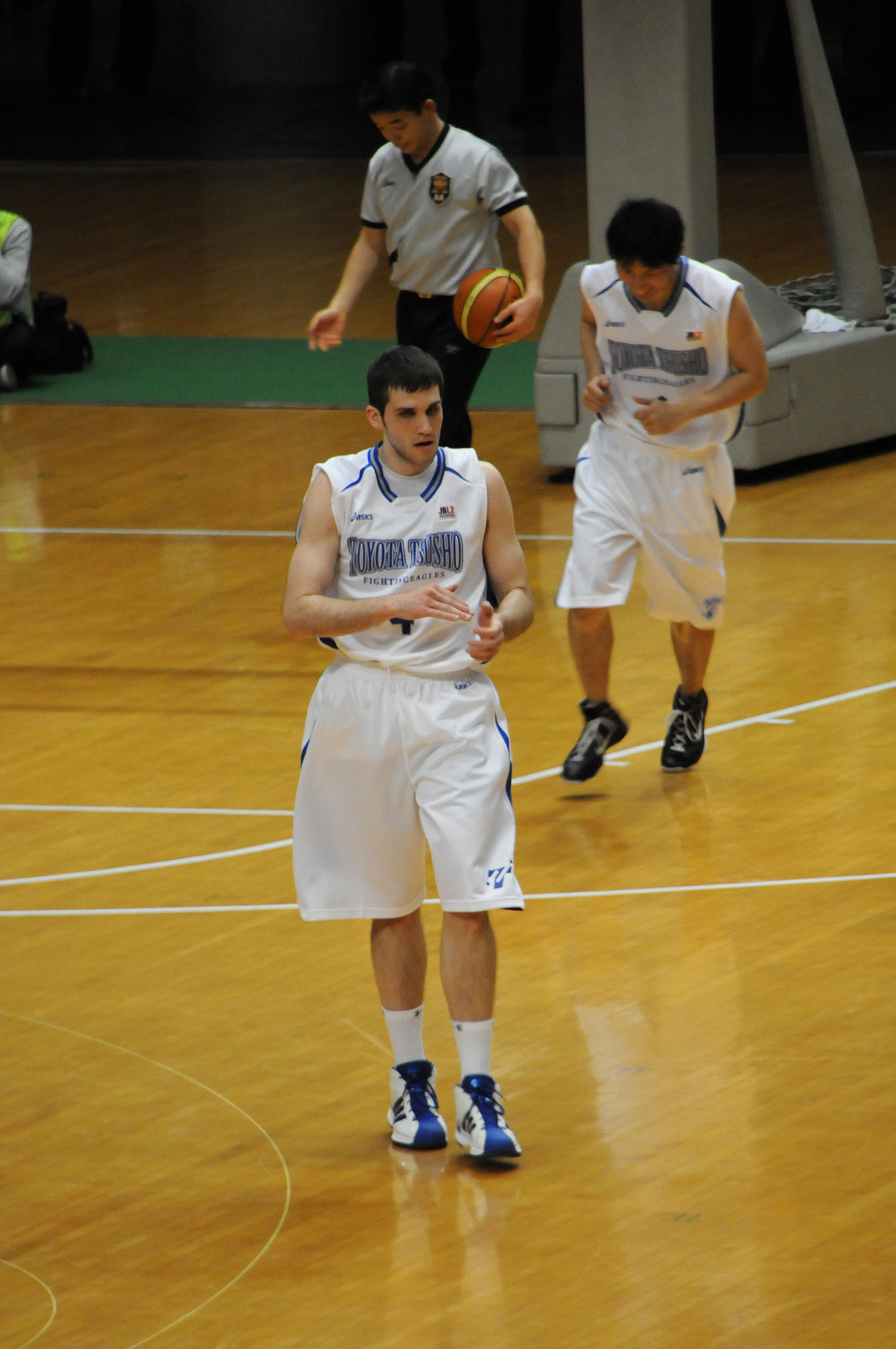
Michael Housman

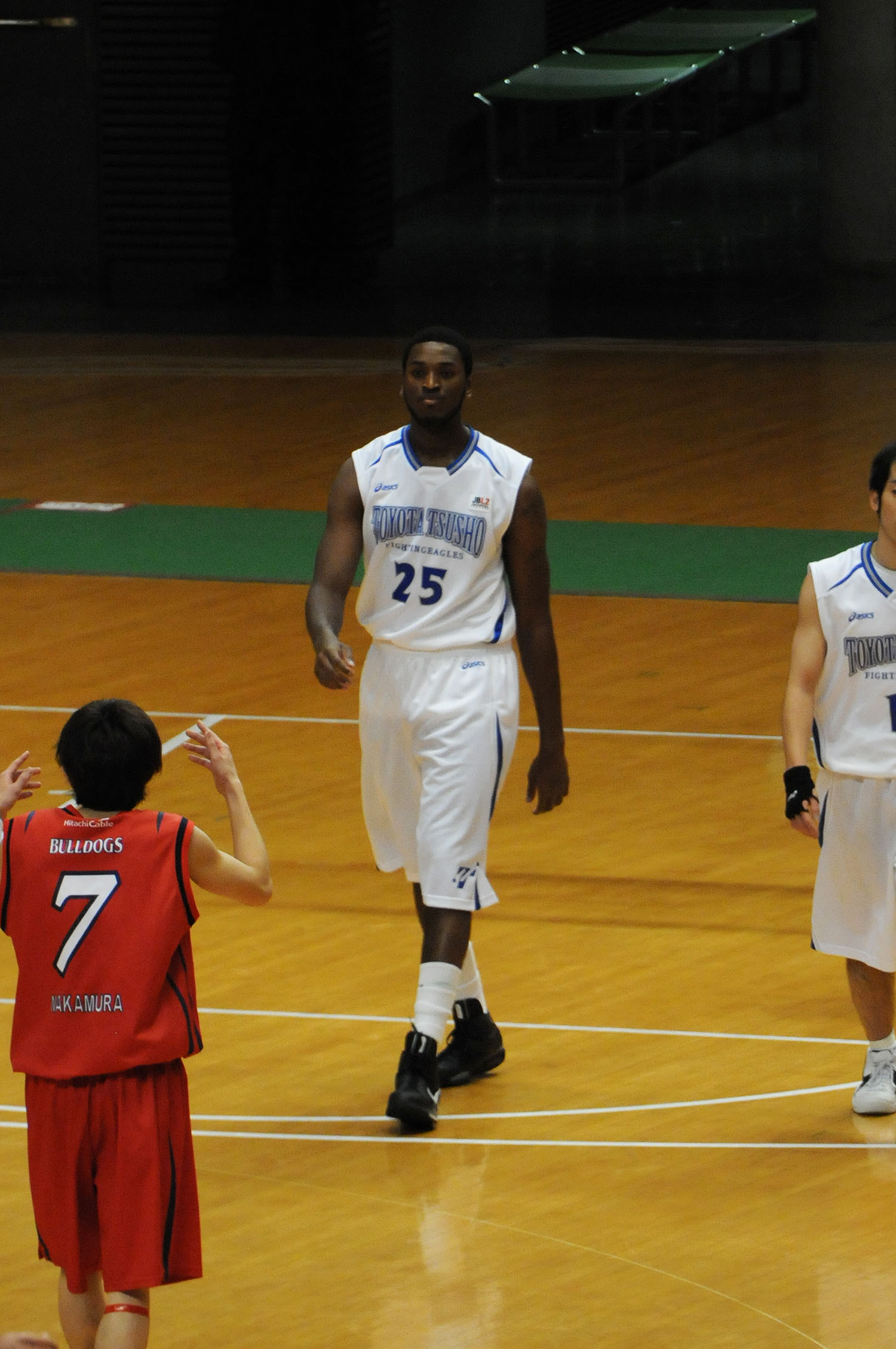
Courtney Williams

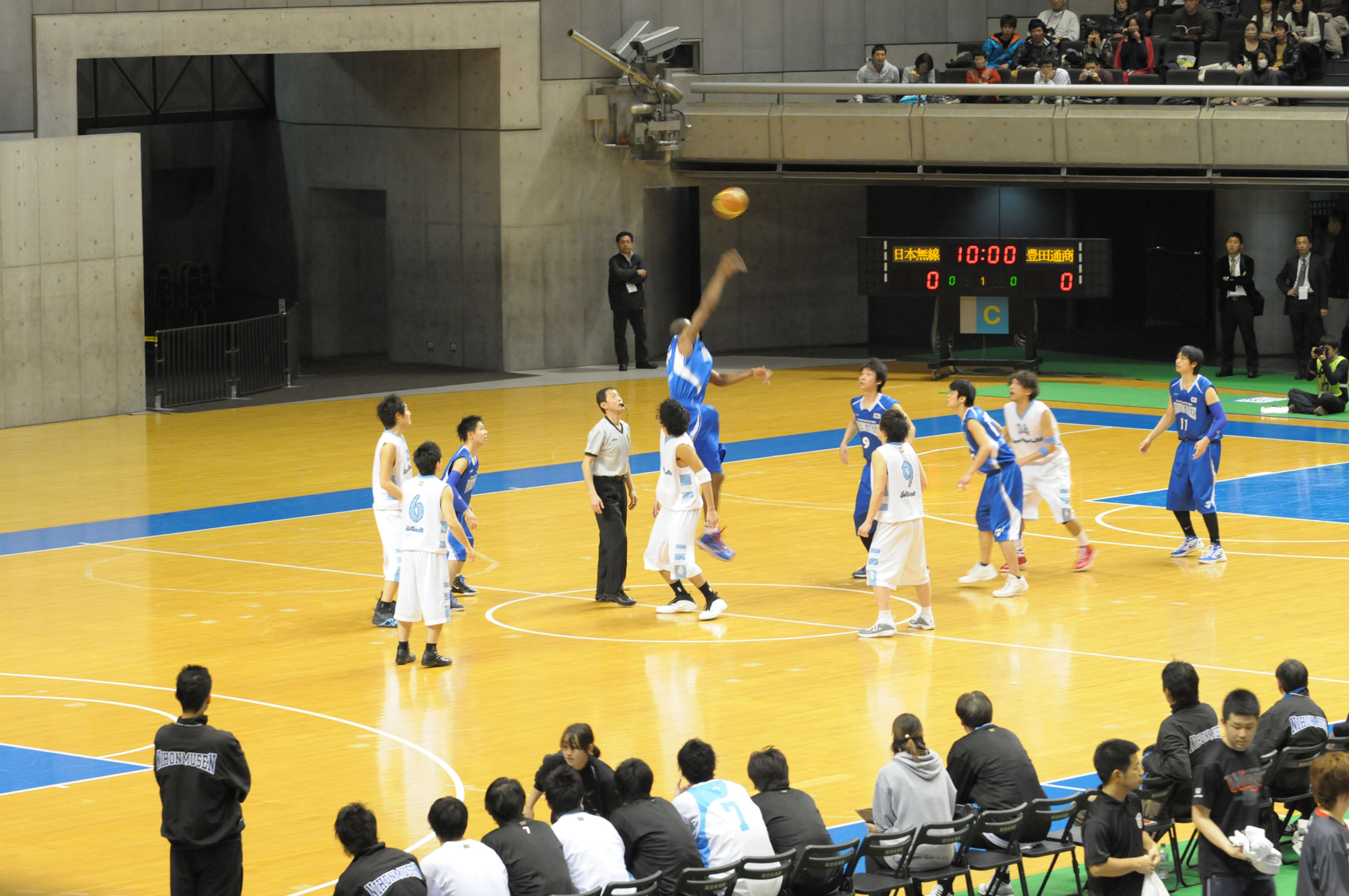

== Practice facilities ==
- Toyota Tsusho Midori Gymnasium
