= Ehime Orange Vikings =

- Conference: West
- Division: Second
- Leagues: B.League
- Founded: 2005
- History: Oita Heat Devils (2005–2015); Oita Ehime Heat Devils (2015–2016); Ehime Orange Vikings (2016–present)
- Arena: Matsuyama General Community Center Gymnasium
- Location: Matsuyama, Ehime
- Head coach: Kazuhiro Shoji
- Website: orangevikings.jp.
Home	Away

The Ehime Orange Vikings (愛媛オレンジバイキングス, Ehime Orenji Baikingusu) are a Japanese professional basketball team based in Matsuyama, Ehime Prefecture. The team competes in the B.League One, the second division of the B.League, as a member of the Southern Conference.

The team was founded in 2005 as the Oita HeatDevils, one of the founding members of the bj league. The team was based in Ōita city, Ōita Prefecture until 2015, at which time the club relocated to Matsuyama for the 2015-16 season of the bj league and changed its name to the Oita Ehime HeatDevils.

== History ==
=== Early years: 2005–11 ===
The team was founded as the Oita HeatDevils in 2005 and were one of six founding members of the bj league, a professional league set up in competition to the Japan Basketball League operated by the Japan Basketball Association. Their first league game was on 5 October 2005, which they won 100–95 against Osaka Evessa. After losing to Osaka in their second match the following day, Oita hosted their first home game a week later against the Sendai 89ers at the Beppu Beacon Plaza. They lost both matches in the series though, and their losing streak increased to six until they won the second game of a return series in Sendai on 3 December. After that they won just two of their next twelve matches for a 4–16 win–loss record at the mid-point of the season. Oita improved in the second half of the season and managed a six-game winning streak at one stage. They finished in fifth place with a 15–25 win–loss record, three games behind fourth-placed Sendai. They played the majority of their home matches at Beppu Arena.

In the 2006–07 season, when the bj league expanded to eight teams, Oita compiled a 22–18 win–loss record, their only winning season to date, and finished in fourth place, thereby qualifying for their first finals appearance. They lost their semi-final against the top-placed and eventual champions Osaka Evessa 69–63, before recovering the next day to defeat Niigata Albirex BB 92–70 in the playoff for third. To increase their popularity in the wider region, the team played half of their home games in Beppu and two matches each in Hita, Oita and Usa cities in Oita Prefecture as well as Buzen and Fukuoka cities in Fukuoka Prefecture.

The following season the league expanded to ten teams and divided into eastern and western conferences, with the top three teams in each conference advancing to the playoffs. In the Western Conference, the HeatDevils finished in fourth place (19–25), one game behind the expansion Rizing Fukuoka (20–24). Oita finished the season disastrously, losing their final five games while Fukuoka won seven of their last eight to climb into third place. Coach Dai Oketani left the club at the end of the season.

The 2008–09 season under replacement coach Tadaharu Ogawa saw Oita fall to just eight wins, the worst record in the expanded 12-team, 52-game league. The following year the team hired former NBA player Brian Rowsom to coach the club. He led the team to a 25–27 record, finishing 5th in the Western Conference, four games outside of the playoffs behind the Shiga Lakestars. In the middle of April Oita was just one game behind Shiga, but a poor finish to the season once again hurt the team, losing four of their final six matches while Shiga won five over the same period.

The 2010–11 season saw the league expand to 16 teams and the playoff system was expanded to include the top six teams of each conference. However, the season was ultimately affected by the March 2011 Tohoku earthquake, which led to three Eastern Conference teams withdrawing from play before the season ended. In the Western Conference, which had expanded to nine teams with the introduction of the Shimane Susanoo Magic and Miyazaki Shining Suns, the HeatDevils were in contention for a playoff spot at the time of the earthquake, their 16–22 record placing them just one game behind sixth-placed Shimane. However, three of the team's four American players (Taj Finger, Rolando Howell and Cyrus Tate) broke their contracts and left the country in the week after the earthquake and the team subsequently fired coach L. J. Hepp for failing to convince the players to remain in Japan. Assistant coach Tony Hanson (tl) took over coaching responsibilities following the departures and the team lost their remaining ten matches, finishing the season seven games behind Shimane.

=== Suzuki years: 2011–15 ===
The team's star player Yukinori Suzuki, who had been with the club since its inception and appeared in three All-Star matches, retired at the end of the 2010–2011 at the age of 34 in order to take over as the club's head coach. Oita started the 2011–2012 season poorly, winning just five of their 24 games before the All-Star break. But they finished the season strongly, winning 14 of their last 17 games, including a 7-game streak in March and the final 5 games of the season, finishing 7th in the 10-team conference with a 23–29 record.

Oita started the 2012–13 season strongly, winning eight of their first ten games to sit second in the Western Conference standings. However during this time Tomohiro Hashimoto, the president of Oita Heat, the company that owned the team, reported to the league that negotiations with a planned season sponsor had not gone well. On 22 November Hashimoto requested a 25 million yen bailout from the league's assistance fund and the league, anticipating the company's demise, established an incorporated association named Temporary Game Operation (TGO). A week later the league determined that Hashimoto's request was without the agreement of the company's shareholders and refused the request. On 3 December Oita Heat requested withdrawal from the league and control of the team was transferred to TGO.

On the court the team's financial difficulties became obvious, with their foreign players departing due to unpaid salaries and the team managing to win just one of their next 16 games, falling to 8th place with a 9–17 record at the All-Star break. In the second half of the season TGO secured the services of new foreign players and the team managed a 12–14 record to finish in 8th place. In May 2013 ownership of the team was transferred to the Basukede (バスケで) corporation.

Under new corporate ownership for 2013–14, the team was unable to secure a main sponsor prior to the start of the season. The team planned to host a two-game series against the expansion team Bambitious Nara on 25 and 26 October at Ōita Bank Dome, a 40,000-capacity stadium with a retractable roof. This match was to be the first game in Japanese basketball history played in an outdoor stadium. However, the approach of Typhoon Francisco gave the Nara coach concern about the safety of the playing conditions. The two coaches and stadium officials ultimately decided to go ahead with the match and started one hour later than the scheduled time. Meanwhile, league commissioner Toshimitsu Kawachi decided that the game should be cancelled on account of the weather. Remarkably, due to poor communication channels this decision was not relayed to the teams until after the match was finished. The HeatDevils won the "phantom" contest 79–57, only to learn afterwards that the result would not be recorded as an official victory. The second match the following day was also cancelled, with the HeatDevils hosting a fan appreciation event instead. Despite the various setbacks, Oita started the season strongly and were tied for second place in the Western Conference after 16 games. As the season wore on, the team started to suffer several losing streaks, and slid down the standings to finish in eighth position with a 20–32 record, four games outside the top six.

For the 2014–15 the league's playoff bracket was further expanded so that the top 8 teams of each conference qualified for the finals. On 16 April 2015, with the HeatDevils in 7th place and guaranteed their first playoff appearance in eight years, the league announced the withdrawal of Oita's operating company Basukede from the league due to their worsening financial position, after reporting losses of 120 million yen over their two years of ownership. On 20 April Basukede concluded an agreement for transfer of ownership of the club to KBC Total Services, a subsidiary of Kawahara Gakuen (河原学園), an educational corporation based in Matsuyama, Ehime. KBC indicated their intention to base the team in both Oita and Ehime prefectures in the following season, but be based in Matsuyama from October 2016.

Oita lost three of their final four regular season games following the announcements, but remained in 7th place despite recording an 18–34 record. They met the reigning champion Ryukyu Golden Kings in the first round of the playoffs and recorded a surprising 74–67 win in Game 1 of the three-game series after trailing 21–9 at quarter time. Ryukyu recovered the next day to win Game 2 92–68, as well as the 10-minute tiebreaker match 23–18 that was played immediately after Game 2. Suzuki left the club at the end of the season, having recorded an 82–126 (39.4%) win–loss record during his four years as coach of the team.

=== Oita Ehime HeatDevils (2015–16) ===
In June 2015, KBC Total Services announced the team was to be known as the Oita Ehime HeatDevils for the 2015–16 season. In the same press release, the team announced their intention to seek public proposals for a new name for the team for the 2016–17 season. The following month an official request for public suggestions was posted to the club's website. In August 2015 it was announced that the HeatDevils will compete in the second division of the B.League, the new league to be created from the bj league and NBL merger. During the 2015–16 season, the team played ten of their 26 home games in Ehime Prefecture, spreading their home games across 8 different stadiums throughout Oita and Ehime Prefectures.

The team hired Tomoyuki Umeda to replace Suzuki as head coach but fired him in the middle of January after they struggled to a 6–18 record and sat in second-last place in the Western Conference. The team hired Shinshu Brave Warriors assistant coach Ryuji Kawai as Umeda's replacement. The team fared better in the second half of the season, posting 10–14 record under Kawai to remain within playoff contention, until consecutive losses to Osaka on April 16 and 17 made it impossible for the team to sneak into eighth spot. In what was to be a fitting end to the team's Oita era, they were scheduled to play their final two games of the season at Beppu Arena on 23 and 24 April 2016 against the Kanazawa Samuraiz, who hired Suzuki as coach during the off-season. However, due to concerns about the possibility of aftershocks following the earthquakes that hit Kumamoto and Oita Prefectures one week earlier, the league announced on 21 April that the matches would be cancelled on account of the safety of patrons. The HeatDevils finished their final season in the bj league in 10th place in the Western Conference, three games outside of the top eight.

=== Ehime Orange Vikings (2016–17) ===
To coincide with the commencement of the B.League in September 2016, the HeatDevils relocated its head office to Matsuyama and announced they would compete in the new league as the Ehime Orange Vikings. The team retained Kawai as head coach and started the season with a 10-man roster that included American imports Joshua Crawford and Craig Williams Jr. and Tatsuhiko Toshino as team captain. After losing their first four games of the season, the team added two small forwards to their roster, Frenchman Rémi Barry as their third import player and Shugaku Izumi.

== Record by season ==
League	Season	Regular Season						Playoffs	Head coach	Ref
League	Season	GP	W	L	%	GB	Finish	Playoffs	Head coach	Ref
bj-league	2005–06	40	15	25	.375	16.0	5th	–	Jawann Oldham; Dai Oketani(acting)	
bj-league	2006–07	40	22	18	.550	7.0	4th	Third	Dai Oketani	
bj-league	2007–08	40	19	25	.432	12.0	West 4th	–	Dai Oketani	
bj-league	2008–09	52	8	44	.154	33.0	West 6th	–	Tadaharu Ogawa	
bj-league	2009–10	52	25	27	.481	9.0	West 5th	–	Brian Rowsom	
bj-league	2010–11	48	16	32	.333	16.0	West 7th	–	L. J. Hepp; Tony Hanson (tl) (acting)	
bj-league	2011–12	52	23	29	.442	33.0	West 7th	–	Yukinori Suzuki	
bj-league	2012–13	52	21	31	.404	21.0	West 8th	–	Yukinori Suzuki	
bj-league	2013–14	52	20	32	.385	23.0	West 8th	–	Yukinori Suzuki	
bj-league	2014–15	52	18	34	.346	26.0	West 6th	Eliminated first round	Yukinori Suzuki	
bj-league	2015–16	50	16	34	.320	24	West 10th	–	Tomoyuki Umeda; Ryuji Kawai (from Jan.16)	
B2	2016–17	60	29	31	.483	22	West 4th	–	Ryuji Kawai	
B2	2017–18	60	33	27	.550	21	West 4th	–	Richard Glesmann	
B2	2018–19	60	20	40	.333	28	West 5th	–	Richard Glesmann	
B2	2019–20	47	24	23	.511	16	West 3rd	–	Richard Glesmann	
B2	2020–21	55	17	38	.309	21.5	West 8th	–	Kazuhiro Shoji	
B2	2021–22	47	22	25	.468	11.5	West 5th	–	Takeo Mabashi	
B2	2022–23	60	26	34	.433	19	West 4th	–	Kazuhiro Shoji	
B2	2023–24	60	22	38	.367	22	West 7th	–	Takayuki Yasuda	
B2	2024–25	60	5	55	.083	37	West 7th	–	Takayuki Yasuda	

== Individual records ==
2005–06 season

- Most steals per game: Jack Hartman (2.0 steals per game)
- Best 3-point shot percentage: Yukinori Suzuki (43.7%)
- League Best Five: Yukinori Suzuki

2006–07 season

- League Best Five: Andy Ellis

2007–08 season

- Most points per game: Andy Ellis (25.1 points per game)
- Best 3-point shot percentage: Yukinori Suzuki (50.4%)
- League Best Five: Andy Ellis

== Roster ==
Ehime Orange Vikings roster
Players
Coaches

Pos.	No.	Nat.	Name
PG	0	(Japan)	Yugo Okuda
G/F	1	(Japan)	Eiji Hayashi
PG	2	(Japan)	Takumi Furuno
PF	3	(United States)	Michael Parker
SG	6	(Japan)	Ryoki Taira
SG	13	(Japan)	Yoshihiko Toshino (C)
C	16	(Netherlands)	Matt Haarms
SG	17	(Japan)	Riki Takeuchi
SG	20	(Japan)	Yamato Harada
PG	21	(Japan)	Ryota Ito
PF	44	(United States)	Shaquille Hines
C	50	(United States)	Mitchell Watt
SG	65	(Japan)	Shogo Tamaki

Head coach

Manuel Pena Garces

Assistant coach(es)

Guillermo Sanchez Daza

Legend

- (C) Team captain
- Injured

- Roster
Updated: 21 November 2025

== Notable players ==
- Chris Ayer
- Rémi Barry
- Geo Chiu
- T. J. Cummings
- Taj Finger
- Rolando Howell
- Damian Johnson
- Matt Lottich
- Demetri McCamey
- Ryosuke Mizumachi
- Yoshifumi Nakajima
- Todd O'Brien
- Tatsuhiko Toshino
- Wendell White
- Ricky Woods

== Coaches ==
- Jawann Oldham
- Dai Oketani
- Brian Rowsom
- L. J. Hepp
- Tony Hanson
- Yukinori Suzuki
- Tomoyuki Umeda
- Ryuji Kawai
- Richard Glesmann
- Kazuhiro Shoji

== Arenas ==
- Matsuyama City General Community Center
- Ehime Prefectural Sports Complex
- Iyo Citizens Gymnasium
- Ikata Sports Center
