= 2021–22 B.League season =

- League: B.League
- Season: 2021–22
- Duration: September 30, 2021 – May 29, 2022
- TV partner(s): Basket LIVE, Amazon Prime Video, Hulu, NHK, SKY PerfecTV!, others

B1 Regular season
- Season MVP: Yuma Fujii
- Promoted: (B1) Fighting Eagles Nagoya, Sendai 89ERS (B2) Nagasaki Velca, Altiri Chiba
- Relegated: (B2) None (B3) None

B1 Finals
- Champions: Utsunomiya Brex
- Runners-up: Ryukyu Golden Kings
- Finals MVP: Makoto Hiejima

Statistical leaders
- Points: Shawn Long
- Rebounds: Sebas Saiz
- Assists: Yuki Togashi

The 2021–22 B.League season was the sixth season of the Japanese B.League.

== B1 ==
=== Regular season ===
East District

#	B1	W	L	PCT	GB	GP
1	Chiba Jets	35	10	.778	—	45
2	Kawasaki Brave Thunders	42	13	.764	0	55
3	Alvark Tokyo	39	14	.736	0	53
4	Utsunomiya Brex	40	16	.714	0.5	56
5	Akita Northern Happinets	31	23	.574	8.5	54
6	Sun Rockers Shibuya	33	26	.559	9	59
7	Gunma Crane Thunders	25	30	.455	15	59
8	Yokohama B-Corsairs	22	35	.386	19	57
9	Levanga Hokkaido	21	35	.375	19.5	56
10	Ibaraki Robots	16	38	.296	23.5	54
11	Niigata Albirex BB	7	45	.135	31.5	52

West District

#	B1	W	L	PCT	GB	GP
1	Ryukyu Golden Kings	49	7	.875	—	56
2	Shimane Susanoo Magic	40	15	.727	8.5	55
3	Nagoya Diamond Dolphins	34	15	.694	11.5	49
4	Seahorses Mikawa	30	23	.566	17.5	53
5	Shinshu Brave Warriors	28	26	.519	20	54
6	Hiroshima Dragonflies	29	28	.509	20.5	57
7	Toyama Grouses	24	35	.407	26.5	59
8	Osaka Evessa	21	36	.368	28.5	57
9	Kyoto Hannaryz	14	43	.246	35.5	57
10	Shiga Lakestars	14	43	.246	35.5	57
11	San-en NeoPhoenix	10	48	.172	40	58

== B1 Individual statistic leaders ==
Category	Player	Team	Statistic
Points per game	(United States) Shawn Long	Levanga Hokkaido	25.0
Rebounds per game	(Spain) Sebas Saiz	Alvark Tokyo	12.4
Assists per game	(Japan) Yuki Togashi	Chiba Jets	6.4
Steals per game	(Spain) Pablo Aguilar	Kawasaki Brave Thunders	1.6
Blocks per game	(United States) Alex Davis	Akita Northern Happinets	1.5
FT%	(Japan) Ryoma Hashimoto	Levanga Hokkaido	92.0%
3FG%	(Japan) Yusuke Karino	Nagoya Diamond Dolphins	52.9%

== B2 ==
2021–22 B.League season

B2 Regular season
- Season MVP: Terrance Woodbury

B2 Finals
- Champions: Fighting Eagles Nagoya
- Runners-up: Sendai 89ers
- Finals MVP: Scootie Randall

Statistical leaders
- Points: L. J. Peak
- Rebounds: Isaac Butts
- Assists: Tatsuhiko Toshino

=== Regular season ===
East District

#	B2	W	L	PCT	GB	GP
1	Fighting Eagles Nagoya	42	8	.840	-	50
2	Sendai 89ers	38	15	.717	5.5	53
3	Fukushima Firebonds	34	18	.654	9	52
4	Koshigaya Alphas	25	23	.521	16	48
5	Yamagata Wyverns	19	33	.365	24	52
6	Earthfriends Tokyo Z	10	43	.189	33.5	53
7	Aomori Wat's	5	47	.096	38	52

West District

#	B2	W	L	PCT	GB	GP
1	Kagawa Five Arrows	36	16	.692	-	52
2	Kumamoto Volters	36	18	.667	1	54
3	Nishinomiya Storks	36	19	.655	1.5	55
4	Saga Ballooners	29	21	.580	6	50
5	Ehime Orange Vikings	22	25	.468	11.5	47
6	Rizing Zephyr Fukuoka	20	30	.400	15	50
7	Bambitious Nara	9	45	.167	28	54

== B2 Individual statistic leaders ==
Category	Player	Team	Statistic
Points per game	(United States) L. J. Peak	Kumamoto Volters	23.7
Rebounds per game	(United States) Isaac Butts	Koshigaya Alphas	14.0
Assists per game	(Japan) Tatsuhiko Toshino	Ehime Orange Vikings	6.2
Steals per game	(United Kingdom) Myles Hesson	Saga Ballooners	2.2
Blocks per game	(United Kingdom) Ben Lawson	Kumamoto Volters	1.8
FT%	(Japan) Noriaki Dohara	Nishinomiya Storks	85.5%
3FG%	(Japan) Seiji Kono	Yamagata Wyverns	43.7%
