= Takeshi Hotta =

Japanese basketball player and coach

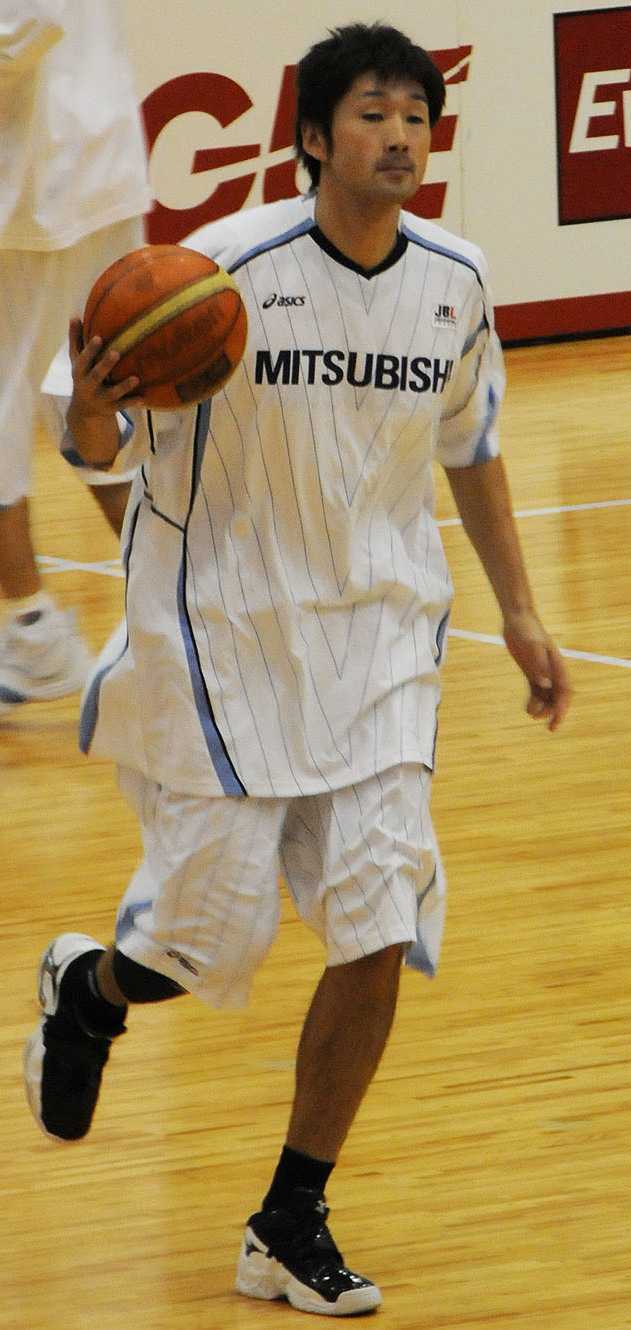
- Hotta in 2009

Aomori Wat's
- Position: Head coach
- League: B.League

Personal information
- Born: February 13, 1978 (age 48) Kohoku-ku, Yokohama
- Listed height: 6 ft 5 in (1.96 m)
- Listed weight: 187 lb (85 kg)

Career information
- High school: Shonan Institute of Technology (Fujisawa, Kanagawa)
- College: Nippon Sport Science University
- Coaching career: 2016–present

Career history

Playing
- 2000-2005: Niigata Albirex BB
- 2005: Fukuoka Red Falcons
- 2005-2009: Hamamatsu Higashimikawa Phoenix
- 2009-2014: Mitsubishi Electric
- 2011-2014: Yokohama B-Corsairs
- 2016-2017: Niigata Albirex BB

Coaching
- 2016-2017: Niigata Albirex BB (asst)
- 2017-2019: Kanazawa Samuraiz
- 2019-2021: Hiroshima Dragonflies
- 2021-present: Aomori Wat's

Career highlights
- bj league champion (2013)

Takeshi Hotta (堀田剛司, Hotta Takeshi) is the Head coach of the Aomori Wat's in the Japanese B.League.

== Head coaching record ==
Legend
Regular season	G	Games coached	W	Games won	L	Games lost	W–L %	Win–loss %
Playoffs	PG	Playoff games	PW	Playoff wins	PL	Playoff losses	PW–L %	Playoff win–loss %

Team	Year	G	W	L	W–L%	Finish	PG	PW	PL	PW–L%	Result
Kanazawa Samuraiz	2017-18	60	28	32	.467	4th in B2 Central	-	-	-	–	-
Kanazawa Samuraiz	2018-19	60	21	39	.350	5th in B2 Central	-	-	-	–	-
