= Yukinori Suzuki =

Japanese basketball player (born 1977)

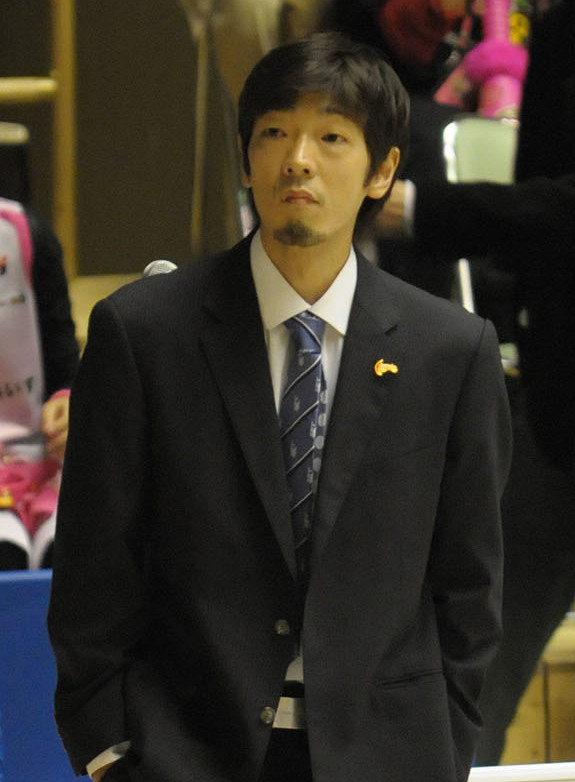
- Suzuki in 2011

Iwate Big Bulls
- Position: Head coach
- League: B.League

Personal information
- Born: May 27, 1977 (age 49) Totsuka-ku, Yokohama
- Listed height: 5 ft 11 in (1.80 m)
- Listed weight: 155 lb (70 kg)

Career information
- High school: Shonan Institute of Technology (Fujisawa, Kanagawa)
- College: Nippon Sport Science University
- Coaching career: 2011–present

Career history

Playing
- 2001–2005: Niigata Albirex
- 2005–2011: Oita Heat Devils

Coaching
- 2011–2015: Oita Heat Devils
- 2015–2017: Kanazawa Samuraiz
- 2017–2020: Shimane Susanoo Magic
- 2022–present: Iwate Big Bulls

Career highlights
- 2× bj league leader in 3-pt shooting percentage (2005–2006, 2006–2007); bj league Best 5 of the season (2005–2006)

Yukinori Suzuki (鈴木裕紀, Suzuki Yukinori) is a Japanese professional basketball coach and former player, currently serving as the head coach for the Iwate Big Bulls of the B.League. Prior to Iwate, he coached the Shimane Susanoo Magic. Suzuki played college basketball for Nippon Sport Science University. He was selected by the Oita Heat Devils with the 10th pick in the 2005 bj league draft.

== Power harassment ==
B.League suspended Suzuki for two months on January 21, 2020. For his power harassment to an assistant and a player, he is not allowed to coach.

== Career statistics ==
Legend
GP	Games played	GS	Games started	MPG	Minutes per game
FG%	Field goal percentage	3P%	3-point field goal percentage	FT%	Free throw percentage
RPG	Rebounds per game	APG	Assists per game	SPG	Steals per game
BPG	Blocks per game	PPG	Points per game	**Bold**	Career high

=== Regular season ===
Year	Team	GP	GS	MPG	FG%	3P%	FT%	RPG	APG	SPG	BPG	PPG
2005-06	Oita	39		31.46	**.427**	.437	**.820**	**2.41**	**4.10**	0.51	0.00	8.00
2006-07	Oita	34		**33.03**	.400	.337	.780	1.74	3.53	0.62	0.00	9.41
2007-08	Oita	35		30.80	.425	**.504**	.776	1.69	3.20	0.49	0.00	**9.69**
2008-09	Oita	48	38	28.31	.401	.369	.705	2.33	3.52	**0.65**	**0.02**	5.90
2009-10	Oita	**52**		23.06	.431	.344	.778	1.65	1.88	0.52	0.00	5.69
2010-11	Oita	48	19	13.77	.360	.268	.778	0.79	0.81	0.15	0.00	2.46
Career		256										

== Head coaching record ==
Legend
Regular season	G	Games coached	W	Games won	L	Games lost	W–L %	Win–loss %
Playoffs	PG	Playoff games	PW	Playoff wins	PL	Playoff losses	PW–L %	Playoff win–loss %

Team	Year	G	W	L	W–L%	Finish	PG	PW	PL	PW–L%	Result
Oita Heat Devils	2011-12	52	23	29	.442	7th in Western	-	-	-	–	-
Oita Heat Devils	2012-13	52	21	31	.404	8th in Western	-	-	-	–	-
Oita Heat Devils	2013-14	52	20	32	.385	8th in Western	-	-	-	–	-
Oita Heat Devils	2014-15	52	18	34	.346	7th in Western	3	1	2	.333	Lost in 1st round
Kanazawa Samuraiz	2015-16	50	27	23	.540	7th in Western	2	0	2	.000	Lost in 1st round
Kanazawa Samuraiz	2016-17	42	36	6	.857	1st in B3	10	8	2	.800	2nd in Final stage
Shimane Susanoo Magic	2017-18	60	11	49	.183	6th in Western	-	-	-	–	relegated to B2
Shimane Susanoo Magic	2018-19	60	43	17	.717	2nd in B2 Western	4	2	2	.500	promoted to B1
Shimane Susanoo Magic	2019-20	29	10	19	.345	-	-	-	-	–	-

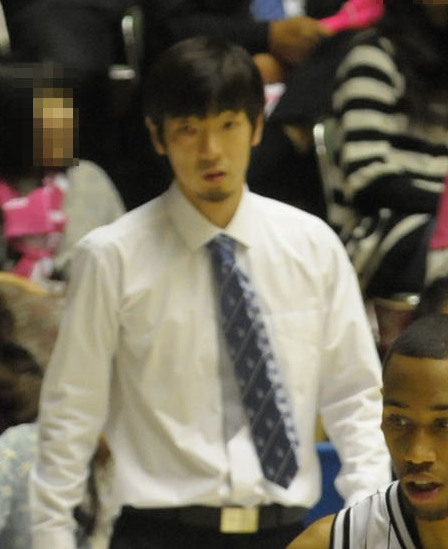
Suzuki at Akita Prefectural Gymnasium
