= Akaho =

Akaho (written: 赤穂, 赤保 and 明穂) is a Japanese surname. Notable people with the surname include:

- Himawari Akaho (赤穂 ひまわり, born 1998), Japanese women's basketball player
- Makoto Akaho (赤穂 真, born 1971), Japanese basketball player
- Sakura Akaho (赤穂 さくら, born 1996), Japanese women's basketball player
