= Dai Oketani =

Japanese basketball coach (born 1977)

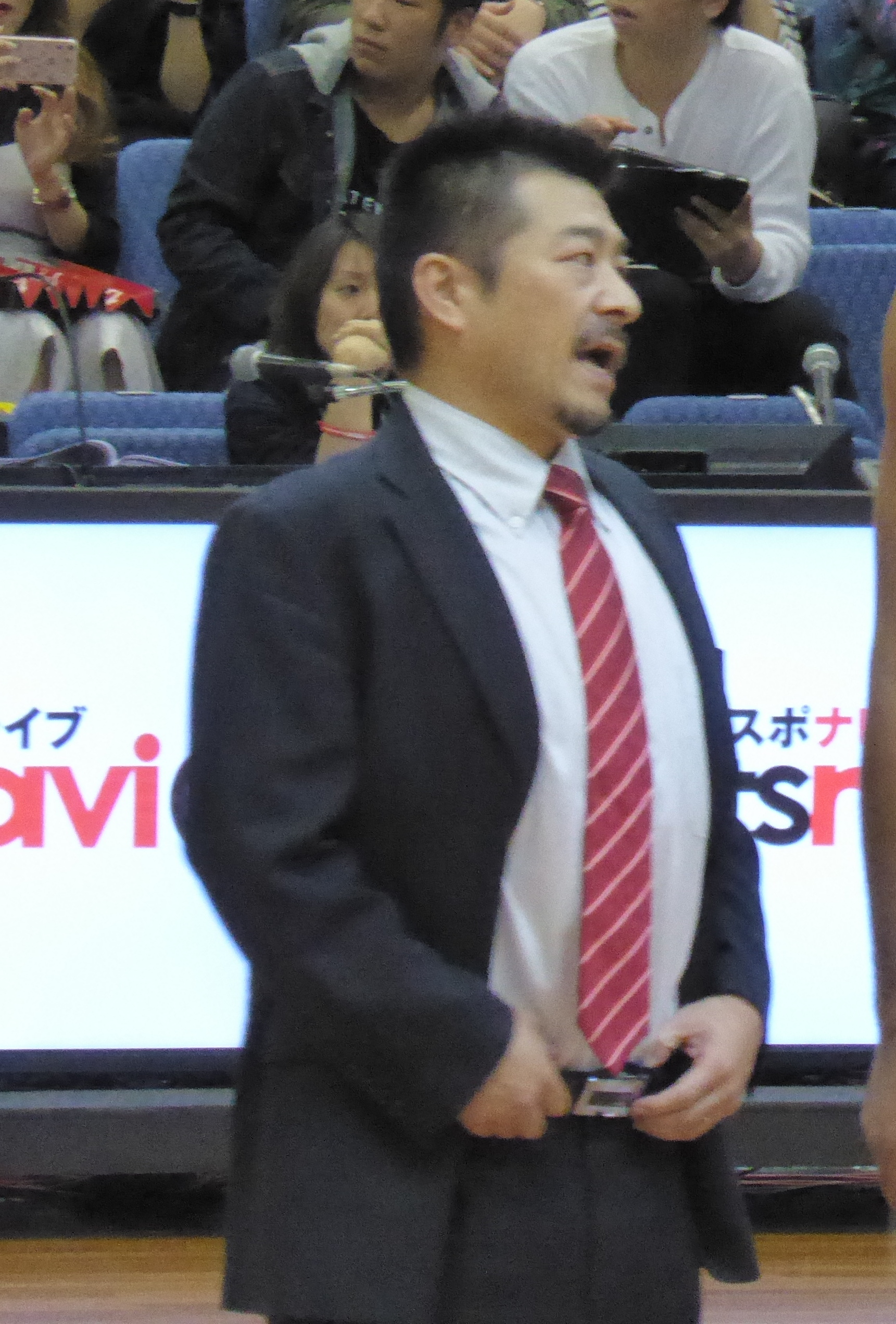
- Oketani with Osaka Evessa in 2016

Kawasaki Brave Thunders
- Position: Head coach
- League: B.League

Personal information
- Born: December 23, 1977 (age 48) Kyoto, Japan
- Listed height: 163 cm (5 ft 4 in)

Career information
- High school: Suzaku (Nakagyō-ku, Kyoto)
- College: Arizona State

Career history

Coaching
- 2005–2006: Oita Heat Devils (asst)
- 2006–2008: Oita Heat Devils
- 2008–2012: Ryukyu Golden Kings
- 2012–2015: Iwate Big Bulls
- 2015–2018: Osaka Evessa
- 2018–2021: Sendai 89ers
- 2021–2026: Ryukyu Golden Kings
- 2026–present: Japan
- 2026–present: Kawasaki Brave Thunders

Career highlights
- B.League Champion (2023); 2x bj League Champion (2009, 2012)

Dai Oketani (桶谷大, Oketani Dai; born December 23, 1977) is a Japanese professional basketball coach, who currently serves as head coach for the Kawasaki Brave Thunders of the B.League and the Japanese national team.

== Head coaching record ==
Legend
Regular season	G	Games coached	W	Games won	L	Games lost	W–L %	Win–loss %
Playoffs	PG	Playoff games	PW	Playoff wins	PL	Playoff losses	PW–L %	Playoff win–loss %

Team	Year	G	W	L	W–L%	Finish	PG	PW	PL	PW–L%	Result
Oita Heat Devils	2006	24	11	13	.458	5th in bj	-	-	-	–	-
Oita Heat Devils	2006-07	40	22	18	.550	4th in bj	1	0	1	.000	3rd place
Oita Heat Devils	2007-08	44	19	25	.432	4th in Western	-	-	-	–	-
Ryukyu Golden Kings	2008-09	52	41	11	.788	1st in Western	4	4	0	1.000	Champions
Ryukyu Golden Kings	2009-10	52	33	19	.635	2nd in Western	4	3	1	.750	3rd place
Ryukyu Golden Kings	2010-11	50	34	16	.680	1st in Western	4	3	1	.750	Western Champions
Ryukyu Golden Kings	2011-12	52	39	13	.750	1st in Western	4	4	0	1.000	Champions
Iwate Big Bulls	2012-13	52	34	18	.654	4th in Eastern	3	1	2	.333	Lost in first round
Iwate Big Bulls	2013-14	52	40	12	.769	2d in Eastern	2	0	2	.000	Lost in second round
Iwate Big Bulls	2014-15	52	41	11	.788	2d in Eastern	6	4	2	.667	4th place
Osaka Evessa	2015-16	52	35	17	.673	6th in Western	4	2	2	.500	Lost in second round
Osaka Evessa	2016-17	60	28	32	.467	3rd in Western	-	-	-	–	-
Osaka Evessa	2017-18	60	24	36	.400	4th in Western	-	-	-	–	-
Sendai 89ers	2018-19	60	40	20	.667	2nd in B2 Eastern	-	-	-	–	-
Sendai 89ers	2019-20	47	35	12	.745	1st in B2 Eastern	-	-	-	–	-
