= Tatsuhiko Toshino =

Japanese basketball player

Tatsuhiko Toshino 俊野達彦
No. 33 – Yokohama Excellence
- Position: Shooting guard
- League: B.League

Personal information
- Born: January 18, 1988 (age 38) Matsuyama, Ehime, Japan
- Listed height: 6 ft 1 in (1.85 m)
- Listed weight: 176 lb (80 kg)

Career information
- High school: Nitta (Matsuyama, Ehime)
- College: Osaka University of Commerce
- Playing career: 2010–present

Career history
- 2010-2011: Soka Club
- 2011-2012: Chiba X Dreams
- 2012-2014: Gunma Crane Thunders
- 2014-2015: Shinshu Brave Warriors
- 2015-2018: Oita Ehime Heat Devils
- 2018: Akita Northern Happinets
- 2018-2019: Sendai 89ers
- 2019-2022: Ehime Orange Vikings

Career highlights
- bj league MIP (2015-16); bj league All-star Game (2016); B2 League Assist Leader (2022)

Tatsuhiko Toshino (born January 18, 1988) is a Japanese professional basketball player who plays for the Ehime Orange Vikings of the B.League in Japan. He played college basketball for Osaka University of Commerce. He was selected by the Gunma Crane Thunders with the 11th overall pick in the 2012 bj League draft. He is a new captain of the Happinets in 2018. He torn his right knee ACL on February 23, 2019.

== Career statistics ==
Legend
GP	Games played	GS	Games started	MPG	Minutes per game
FG%	Field goal percentage	3P%	3-point field goal percentage	FT%	Free throw percentage
RPG	Rebounds per game	APG	Assists per game	SPG	Steals per game
BPG	Blocks per game	PPG	Points per game	**Bold**	Career high

*	Led the league

=== Regular season ===
Year	Team	GP	GS	MPG	FG%	3P%	FT%	RPG	APG	SPG	BPG	PPG
2012-13	Gunma	49	8	13.1	.290	.207	.655	2.3	0.9	0.6	0.0	4.2
2013-14	Gunma	31	6	7.2	.286	.235	.731	0.9	0.4	0.4	0.0	2.4
2014-15	Shinshu	50	10	11.5	.389	.224	.481	2.4	0.9	0.6	0.1	3.1
2015-16	Oita Ehime	50	50	**33.1**	.362	.308	.698	3.0	4.4	**1.7**	0.2	**14.5**
2016-17	Ehime	52	52	32.5	.374	.280	**.775**	3.6	3.5	1.6	**0.3**	13.5
2017-18	Ehime	**53**	**53**	**33.1***	**.441**	**.350**	.718	**3.8**	**5.2**	1.1	0.2	12.4
2018-19	Akita	10	1	9.6	.220	.100	.000	0.6	1.1	0.2	0.0	1.3
2018-19	Sendai	15	5	15.3	.321	.130	.600	1.7	1.8	0.4	0.2	4.6
2019-20	Ehime	45	45	27.3	.369	.272	.723	2.4	3.2	1.2	0.1	8.9

=== Early cup games ===
Year	Team	GP	GS	MPG	FG%	3P%	FT%	RPG	APG	SPG	BPG	PPG
2018	Akita	2	2	20:58	.250	.000	.600	2.5	3.0	2.0	0	5.5
2019	Ehime	2	2	26:27	.158	.083	.000	4.5	1.5	0.5	0	3.5

=== Preseason games ===
Year	Team	GP	GS	MPG	FG%	3P%	FT%	RPG	APG	SPG	BPG	PPG
2018	Akita	2	0	16.6	.286	.000	.000	1.0	3.0	1.0	0.0	2.0

Source: Changwon1Changwon2

== Personal ==
He is a son of Masahiko Toshino. His brother, Yoshihiko, plays for the Kumamoto Volters of the B.League.
