= Kazuhiro Shoji =

Japanese basketball player and coach

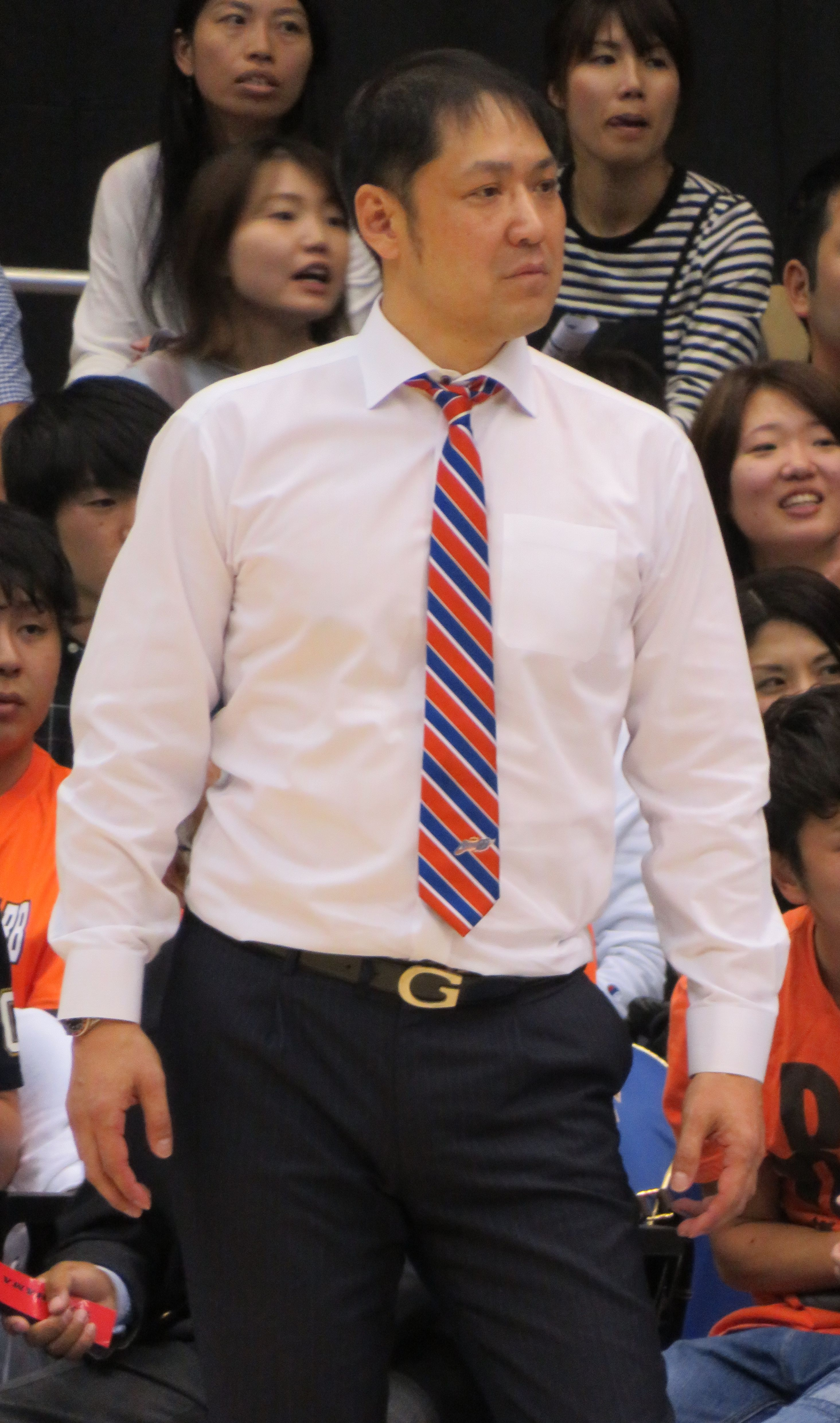
- Shoji at Yokohama International Swimming Pool

Ehime Orange Vikings
- Position: Head coach
- League: B.League

Personal information
- Born: April 26, 1974 (age 52) Sugito, Saitama, Japan
- Listed height: 6 ft 3 in (1.91 m)
- Listed weight: 203 lb (92 kg)

Career information
- High school: Hokuriku (Fukui, Fukui)
- College: Takushoku University
- Playing career: 1997–2013
- Coaching career: 2016–present

Career history

Playing
- 1997-1998: Sumitomo Metal Sparks
- 1998-1999: Toyota Avark
- 1999-2000: Daiwa Securities
- 2000-2005: Niigata Albirex BB
- 2005-2006: Fukuoka Red Falcons
- 2006-2009: Saitama Broncos
- 2009-2010: Takamatsu Five Arrows
- 2010-2013: Akita Northern Happinets

Coaching
- 2016: Takamatsu Five Arrows (asst.)
- 2016-2020: Niigata Albirex BB
- 2020-present: Ehime Orange Vikings

Career highlights
- bj league 3-point scoring leader (2006-07); 2× bj league All-star (2008-09, 2011-12); 5× JBL All-star (1997-98, 2002-06); 2× JBL Best Five (2000-02); JBL Free throw percentage leader (2001-02); JBL Steals leader (2001-02); 2× JBL MVP (2000-02); JBL Rookie of the Year (1997-98)

Kazuhiro Shoji (庄司和広, Shōji Kazuhiro; born April 26, 1974) is a current professional basketball head coach for Ehime Orange Vikings of the Japanese B.League.

== Career statistics ==
Legend
GP	Games played	GS	Games started	MPG	Minutes per game
FG%	Field goal percentage	3P%	3-point field goal percentage	FT%	Free throw percentage
RPG	Rebounds per game	APG	Assists per game	SPG	Steals per game
BPG	Blocks per game	PPG	Points per game	**Bold**	Career high

*	Led league

Year	Team	GP	GS	MPG	FG%	3P%	FT%	RPG	APG	SPG	BPG	PPG
2005-06	Saitama	17	14	27.9	.327	.319	.814	3.9	1.6	1.0	0.0	9.6
2006-07	Saitama	35	33	27.1	.415	.444*	.709	1.8	1.9	0.7	0.1	9.9
2007-08	Saitama	44	38	25.5	.377	.379	.816	2.1	2.1	0.3	0.1	7.8
2008-09	Saitama	52	28	18.9	.428	.408	.747	1.5	1.2	0.3	0.1	5.9
2009-10	Takamatsu	50	20	17.7	.324	.277	.806	1.7	0.4	0.4	0.1	4.0
2010-11	Akita	48	37	23.0	.339	.339	.732	2.4	1.6	0.5	0.1	6.0
2011-12	Akita	52	52	31.3	.413	.383	.730	3.1	1.3	1.1	0.1	7.5
2012-13	Akita	48		22.0	.417	.433	.872	2.0	1.0	0.6	0.1	4.8

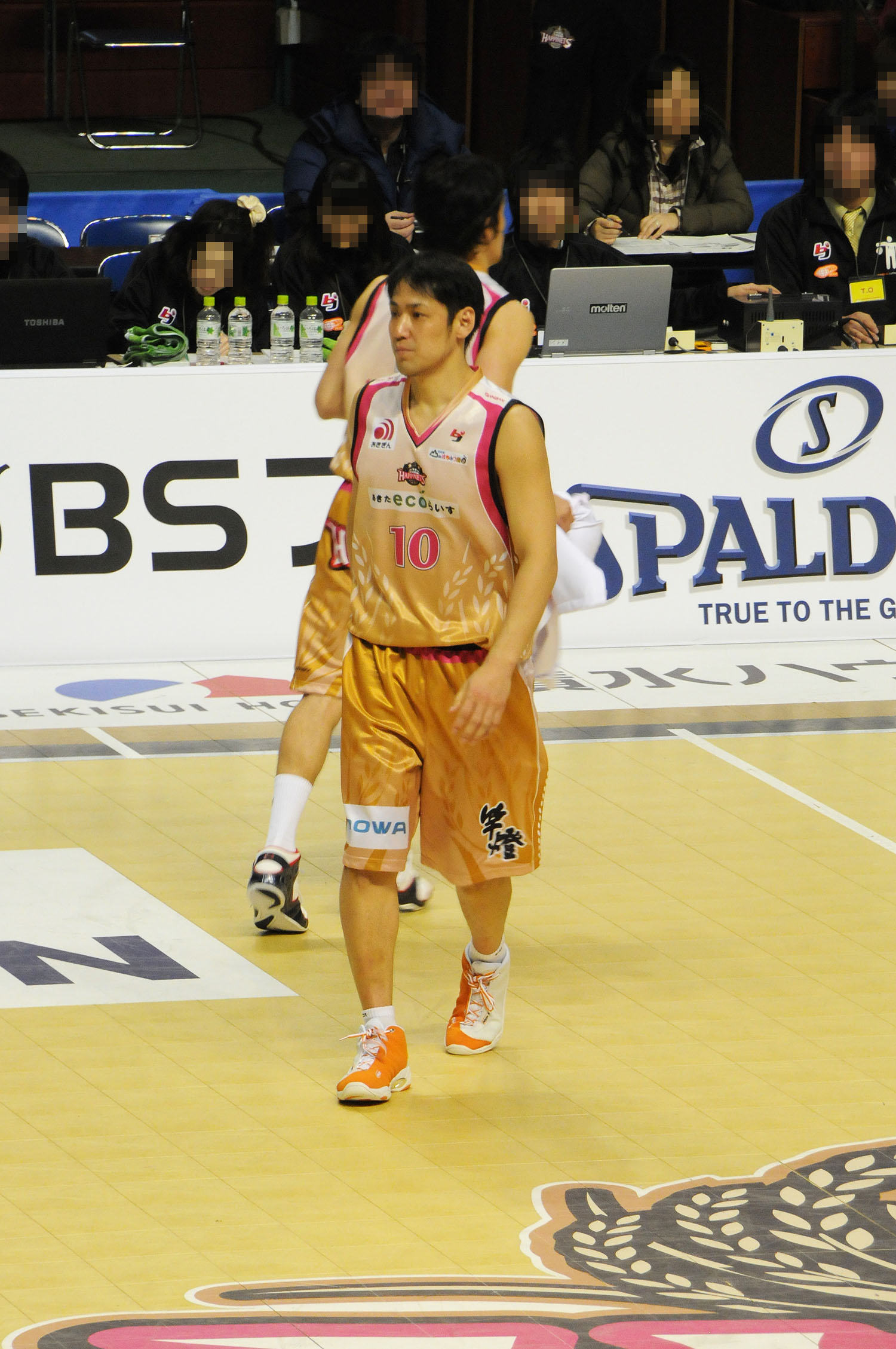
Shoji with Akita

== Head coaching record ==
Legend
Regular season	G	Games coached	W	Games won	L	Games lost	W–L %	Win–loss %
Playoffs	PG	Playoff games	PW	Playoff wins	PL	Playoff losses	PW–L %	Playoff win–loss %

Team	Year	G	W	L	W–L%	Finish	PG	PW	PL	PW–L%	Result
Niigata Albirex BB	2016-17	60	27	33	.450	4th in Central	-	-	-	–	
Niigata Albirex BB	2017-18	60	28	32	.467	3rd in Central	-	-	-	–	
Niigata Albirex BB	2018-19	60	45	15	.750	1st in Central	2	0	2	.000	Lost in 1st round
Niigata Albirex BB	2019-20	41	13	28	.317	4th in Central	-	-	-	–	-
