= Ryosuke Mizumachi =

Japanese basketball player

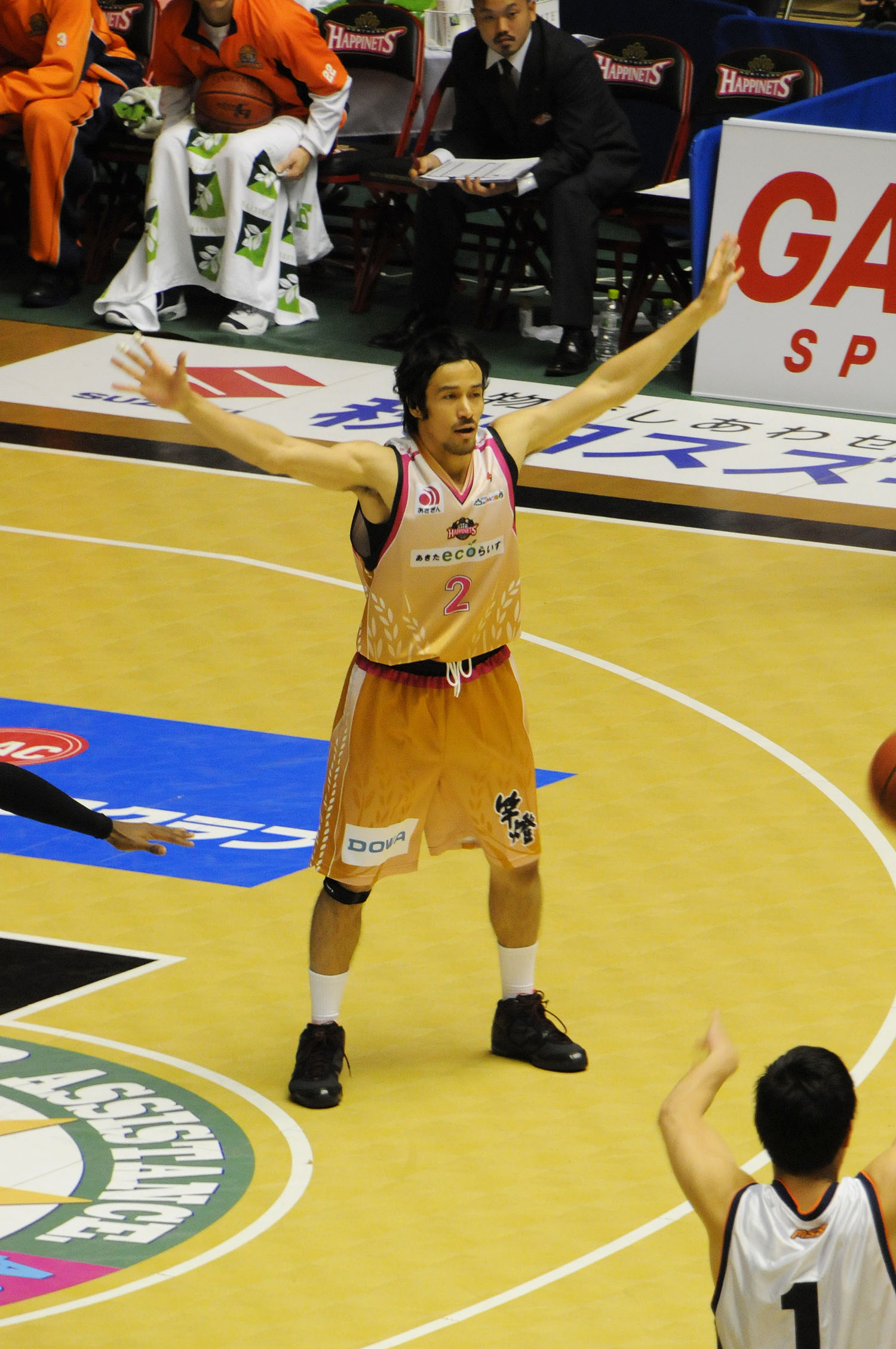
- Mizumachi in 2010

Saga Ballooners
- Position: Academy Development Director
- League: B.League

Personal information
- Born: September 10, 1981 (age 45) Imari, Saga Prefecture, Japan
- Listed height: 6 ft 1 in (1.85 m)
- Listed weight: 183 lb (83 kg)

Career information
- High school: Saganishi (Saga, Japan)
- College: Gakushuin University (2000–2004)
- Playing career: 2004–2018

Career history

Playing
- 2005–2008: Oita Heat Devils
- 2008-2010: Niigata Albirex BB
- 2010-2018: Akita Northern Happinets

Coaching
- 2018-2020: Akita Northern Happinets U15
- 2020-present: Saga Ballooners U15

Ryosuke Mizumachi (水町 亮介, Mizumachi Ryōsuke; born September 10, 1981) is a former Japanese professional basketball player who played for the Akita Northern Happinets of the B.League in Japan.

Mizumachi was born in Imari, Saga Prefecture, Japan and started playing basketball while in elementary school. After graduating from Gakushuin University in 2004 he decided to enter professional basketball, against his parents' wishes. He joined a team below Niigata Albirex BB's organization. In 2005 he was drafted by the Oita Heat Devils in the seventh round (26th overall) of the 2005 bj league draft. During three seasons with Oita he was named as a deputy captain, but was released at the end of the 2007-08 season. He was then signed by Niigata and spent two seasons with their bj league team.

In June 2010 Mizumachi was signed by the Happinets in the second round of the 2010 expansion draft and has served as captain throughout the club's seven seasons in the bj league. He was one of 12 players to participate in all eleven seasons of the bj league. He has remained with Akita following the team's entry into the B.League in September 2016, but has been replaced as captain by Shigehiro Taguchi. His nickname is "Macho".

His retirement ceremony was held at the Akita Prefectural Gymnasium on April 3, 2019.

== Career statistics ==
Legend
GP	Games played	GS	Games started	MPG	Minutes per game
FG%	Field goal percentage	3P%	3-point field goal percentage	FT%	Free throw percentage
RPG	Rebounds per game	APG	Assists per game	SPG	Steals per game
BPG	Blocks per game	PPG	Points per game	**Bold**	Career high

=== Regular season ===
Year	Team	GP	GS	MPG	FG%	3P%	FT%	RPG	APG	SPG	BPG	PPG
2005-06	Oita	31	4	14	36.7%	25.0%	**76.9%**	1.4	1.4	0.5	0	2
2006-07	Oita	22	7	12	43.6%	33.3%	0.0%	1.3	1.2	0.4	0	1.8
2007-08	Oita	29	5	9	32.4%	0.0%	75.0%	1.2	0.9	0.3	0	1
2008-09	Niigata	29	0	4	42.1%	11.1%	50.0%	0.7	0.2	0.3	**0.1**	0.7
2009-10	Niigata	35	11	6	41.0%	**50.0%**	66.7%	0.8	0.6	0.4	0	1.2
2010-11	Akita	50	**45**	**29**	33.2%	30.3%	59.2%	**3.1**	**2.8**	**1.3**	0	**4.6**
2011-12	Akita	50	11	18	42.9%	33.8%	51.7%	1.9	1.6	0.8	0	3.5
2012-13	Akita	44	13	7	46.9%	28.6%	66.7%	1.0	0.9	0.6	0	1.3
2013-14	Akita	41	0	6.0	45.5%	28.6%	42.9%	0.3	0.7	0.5	0	1.2
2014-15	Akita	50	13	13.2	**47.1**	26.5	66.7	1.0	1.5	0.5	**0.1**	2.7
2015-16	Akita	**52**	32	16.2	41.7	28.3	52.6	1.8	2.0	0.8	**0.1**	2.9
2016-17	Akita	45	2	10.4	25.0	0	50.0	0.8	0.7	0.4	0	0.8
2017-18	Akita	48	8	8.4	37.8	22.2	55.6	0.8	0.6	0.4	0	1.4
Career		526		12.5	39.1	27.9	58.6	1.4	1.2	0.6	0.0	2.1

=== Playoffs ===
Year	Team	GP	GS	MPG	FG%	3P%	FT%	RPG	APG	SPG	BPG	PPG
2010-11	Akita	2		31.0	.455	.333	.500	3.5	4.5	1.5	0.0	6.0
2011-12	Akita	4		14.5	.500	.800	.000	1.0	1.3	0.5	0.0	3.0
2013-14	Akita	3	0	4.00	.667	.000	.000	1.0	0.33	0	0	1.33
2016-17	Akita	1	0		.000	.000	.000	0	1.0	0	0	0
2017-18	Akita	5	0	8.06	.200	.000	1.000	1.6	1.8	0.6	0	0.8

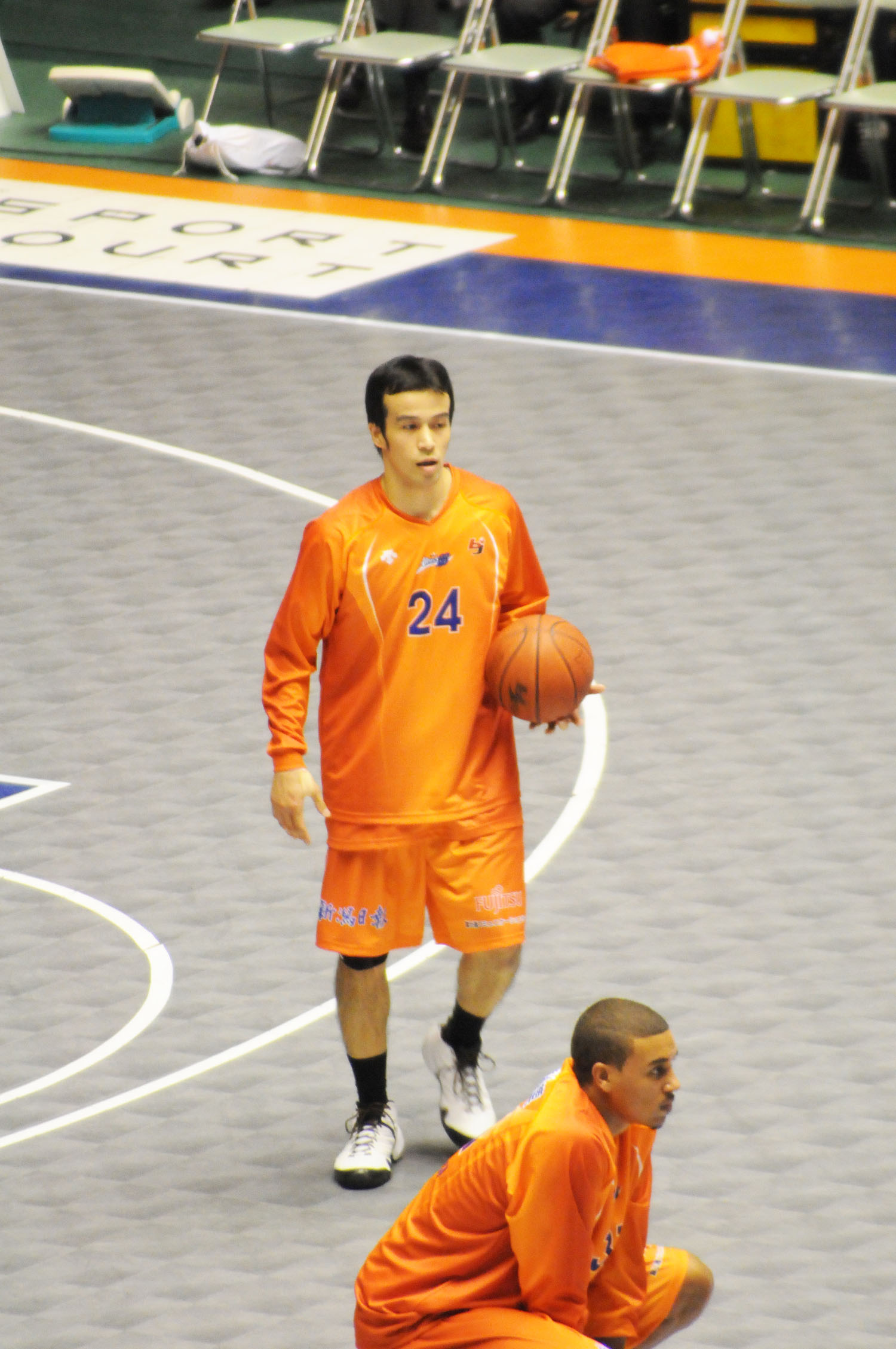
Mizumachi with Niigata
