= Richard Glesmann =

American basketball coach

Richard Glesmann リチャード・グレスマン
Personal information
- Born: June 15, 1978 (age 48) Wayland, Massachusetts
- Position: Head coach

Career history

Coaching
- 2002–2003: Wheelock College
- 2003–2005: Adelphi (asst)
- 2006–2012: Long Island University (asst)
- 2012–2017: Duquesne (asst)
- 2017–2020: Ehime Orange Vikings
- 2020–2023: Ibaraki Robots

Richard Glesmann (born June 15, 1978) is an American basketball head coach, formerly for the Ibaraki Robots of the Japanese B.League until 2023.

== Head coaching record ==
Legend
Regular season	G	Games coached	W	Games won	L	Games lost	W–L %	Win–loss %
Playoffs	PG	Playoff games	PW	Playoff wins	PL	Playoff losses	PW–L %	Playoff win–loss %

Team	Year	G	W	L	W–L%	Finish	PG	PW	PL	PW–L%	Result
Ehime Orange Vikings	2017–18	60	33	27	.550	4th in B2 Western	-	-	-	–	-
Ehime Orange Vikings	2018–19	60	20	40	.333	5th in B2 Western	-	-	-	–	-
