= Ryutaro Onodera =

Japanese basketball player and coach

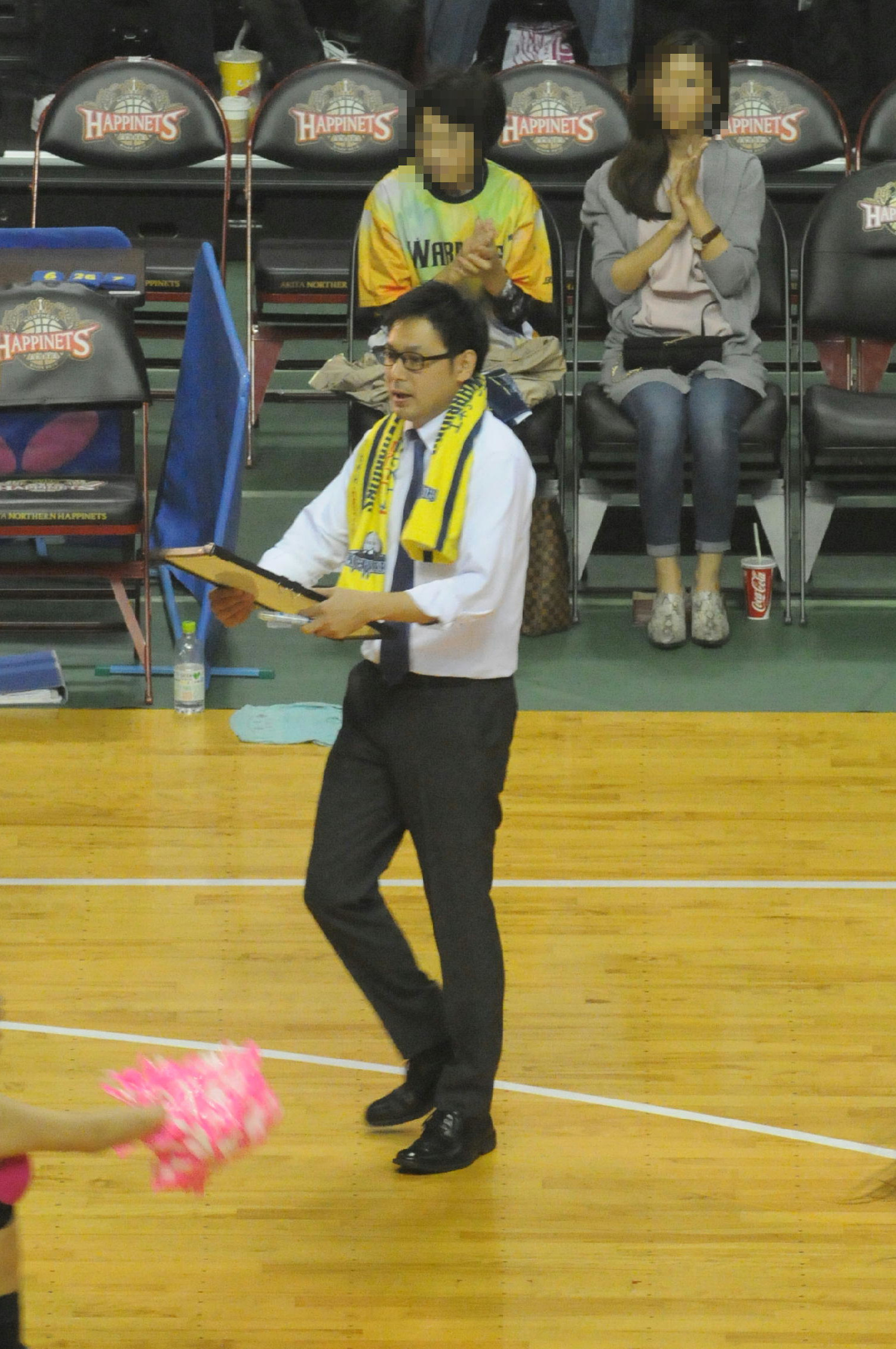

Levanga Hokkaido
- Position: Head coach
- League: B.League

Personal information
- Born: December 9, 1981 (age 44) Kesennuma, Miyagi, Japan

Career information
- High school: Kesennuma Nishi (Kesennuma, Miyagi)
- Playing career: 2001–2004

Career history

Playing
- 2001-2003: Saitama Broncos
- 2003-2004: Broncos Club

Coaching
- 2013: Nippon Tornadoes
- 2013-2014: Saitama Broncos (asst)
- 2014-2015: Bambitious Nara
- 2015-2016: Saitama Broncos
- 2016-2018: Shinshu Brave Warriors
- 2018-2019: Passlab Yamagata Wyverns
- 2019-2020: Shimane Susanoo Magic (asst)
- 2020-present: Levanga Hokkaido (asst)

Ryutaro Onodera (小野寺龍太郎, Onodera Ryutaro) is the Head coach of the Levanga Hokkaido in the Japanese B.League.

== Head coaching record ==
Legend
| Regular season | G | Games coached | W | Games won | L | Games lost | W–L % | Win–loss % |
| Playoffs | PG | Playoff games | PW | Playoff wins | PL | Playoff losses | PW–L % | Playoff win–loss % |

| Team | Year | G | W | L | W–L% | Finish | PG | PW | PL | PW–L% | Result |
|---|---|---|---|---|---|---|---|---|---|---|---|
| Bambitious Nara | 2014-15 | 52 | 12 | 40 | .231 | 10th in Western | - | - | - | – | - |
| Saitama Broncos | 2015-16 | 52 | 5 | 47 | .096 | 11th in Eastern | - | - | - | – | - |
| Shinshu Brave Warriors | 2016-17 | 60 | 14 | 46 | .233 | 6th in B2 Central | - | - | - | – | - |
| Shinshu Brave Warriors | 2017-18 | 60 | 25 | 35 | .417 | 5th in B2 Central | - | - | - | – | - |
| Yamagata Wyverns | 2018-19 | 60 | 22 | 38 | .367 | 5th in B2 Eastern | - | - | - | – | - |
