= Shuto Kawachi =

Japanese basketball player and coach

Altiri Chiba
- Position: Assistant coach
- League: B.League

Personal information
- Born: August 5, 1985 (age 41) Saitama Prefecture
- Listed height: 180 cm (5 ft 11 in)
- Listed weight: 70 kg (154 lb)

Career information
- High school: Keihoku (Bunkyō, Tokyo)
- College: Los Angeles Harbor College; St. John's College (Annapolis/Santa Fe)
- Playing career: 2008–2009

Career history

Playing
- 2008-2009: Hamamatsu Higashimikawa Phoenix

Coaching
- 2009-2012: Hamamatsu Higashimikawa Phoenix (asst.)
- 2013–2016: Sendai 89ers
- 2016-2018: San-en NeoPhoenix (associate)
- 2019: San-en NeoPhoenix (associate)
- 2019-2020: San-en NeoPhoenix
- 2020-present: San-en NeoPhoenix (asst)

Shuto Kawachi (河内 修斗, Kawachi Shūto) is the assistant coach of the San-en NeoPhoenix in the Japanese B.League.

== Career statistics ==
Legend
| GP | Games played | GS | Games started | MPG | Minutes per game |
| FG% | Field goal percentage | 3P% | 3-point field goal percentage | FT% | Free throw percentage |
| RPG | Rebounds per game | APG | Assists per game | SPG | Steals per game |
| BPG | Blocks per game | PPG | Points per game | **Bold** | Career high |

| Year | Team | GP | GS | MPG | FG% | 3P% | FT% | RPG | APG | SPG | BPG | PPG |
|---|---|---|---|---|---|---|---|---|---|---|---|---|
| 2008-09 | Hamamatsu | 8 | | 2.1 | .400 | .333 | .000 | 0.5 | 0.1 | 0.5 | 0.0 | 0.6 |

== Head coaching record ==
Legend
| Regular season | G | Games coached | W | Games won | L | Games lost | W–L % | Win–loss % |
| Playoffs | PG | Playoff games | PW | Playoff wins | PL | Playoff losses | PW–L % | Playoff win–loss % |

| Team | Year | G | W | L | W–L% | Finish | PG | PW | PL | PW–L% | Result |
|---|---|---|---|---|---|---|---|---|---|---|---|
| Sendai 89ers | 2013-14 | 52 | 24 | 28 | .462 | 8th in Eastern | - | - | - | – | - |
| Sendai 89ers | 2014-15 | 52 | 37 | 15 | .712 | 3rd in Eastern | 2 | 0 | 2 | .000 | Lost in 1st round |
| Sendai 89ers | 2015-16 | 52 | 37 | 15 | .712 | 2nd in Eastern | 4 | 2 | 2 | .500 | Lost in 2nd round |
| San-en NeoPhoenix | 2019-20 | 41 | 5 | 36 | .122 | 6th in Central | - | - | - | – | - |
