= Rémi Barry =

French basketball player (born 1991)

Remi Barry
Free Agent
- Position: Small forward

Personal information
- Born: August 27, 1991 (age 35)
- Listed height: 6 ft 8 in (2.03 m)
- Listed weight: 225 lb (102 kg)

Career information
- High school: AMERICAN HERITAGE HS
- College: NM State (2011-2015)
- NBA draft: 2015: undrafted
- Playing career: 2015–present

Career history
- 2015–2016: Miami HEAT
- 2016: Ehime Orange Vikings
- 2017: JA Vichy
- 2017: AV Ohrid
- 2018: Jazine
- 2018: Poitiers Basket 86
- 2018-2019: AS Monaco Basket

Remi Barry (born August 27, 1991) is a French professional basketball player who lastly played for the Monaco Basket of the LNB Pro A.

== Professional career ==
On January 23, 2018, he signed with Croatian basketball club Jazine.
