= Japan Basketball Association =

Governing body of basketball in Japan

- 日本バスケットボール協会; Nihon Basukettobōru Kyōkai
- Abbreviation: JBA
- Formation: 1930
- Type: National Sport Association
- Headquarters: Kobe, Japan
- Affiliations: FIBA, FIBA Asia
- Website: www.japanbasketball.jp

The Japan Basketball Association (日本バスケットボール協会, Nihon basukettobōru kyōkai; abbreviated as JBA) is the governing body of basketball in Japan. Formed in 1930, it is based in Tokyo. The JBA is a member of FIBA and FIBA Asia.

The federation is responsible for the Japan national basketball team and the Japan women's national basketball team and their Under-age teams. It also manages the B.League commenced in October 2016.

As of April 2021, its president has been Yuko Mitsuya.

== History ==
Former logo of the Japan Basketball Association JABBA

Former logo

The JBA was suspended by FIBA on 25 November 2014 for failure to restructure as a fully functional entity and merge two competing leagues (the National Basketball League and the bj league) that had different rules (FIBA and NBA respectively). Yasuhiko Fukatsu had earlier resigned as JBA president on 23 October as talks of a merger between the two leagues fell through. This sanction prevented the JBA from participating in activities (sporting or otherwise) of FIBA and FIBA Asia, which also meant that the national teams would not be able to take part in any FIBA competition.

Japan 2024 Task Force (the task force implemented by FIBA in order to reform basketball management in the country) co-chairman Saburō Kawabuchi was chosen as JBA president on 13 May 2015, on recommendation from FIBA. In May of that year, the Japanese national teams were again allowed to take part in FIBA competition, starting with the 2015 FIBA Asia Women's Championship and 2015 FIBA Asia Championship, with suspension expected to be lifted at FIBA's Central Board meeting taking place in Tokyo in August. The suspension was lifted on 9 August 2015, with FIBA praising the work done over the space of six months to overhaul the structure of the JBA and implement a new combined league (the Japan Professional Basketball League) to start play in 2016.

== National teams ==
=== Men ===
| Men's Team | Manager | Appointed | Time as Manager |
|---|---|---|---|
| Senior | (United States) Tom Hovasse | 21 September 2021 | 4 years, 235 days |
| Under-19 | | | |
| Under-17 | | | |
| 3x3 | | | |
| Under-23 3x3 | | | |
| Wheelchair | (Japan) Kazuyuki Kyoya | 17 February 2020 | 6 years, 86 days |

=== Women ===
| Women's Team | Manager | Appointed | Time as Manager |
|---|---|---|---|
| Senior | (Japan) Toru Ontsuka | 21 September 2021 | 4 years, 235 days |
| Under-19 | | | |
| Under-17 | | | |
| 3x3 | | | |
| Under-23 3x3 | | | |
| Wheelchair | (Japan) Hiroshi Iwano | 17 February 2020 | 6 years, 86 days |

== Current title holders ==
Source: JBA

=== Domestic ===
==== Senior ====
| Competition | Season | Champions | Title | Runners-up | Next season | Dates |
League
| B1 League (B.League) | 2021–22 | Utsunomiya Brex | 2nd | Ryukyu Golden Kings | 2022–23 | |
| B2 League (B.League) | 2021–22 | Gunma Crane Thunders | 1st | Ibaraki Robots | 2022–23 | |
| B3 League | 2021–22 (ja) | Aisin AW Areions Anjo | 1st | Tryhoop Okayama | 2022–23 (ja) | |
Cup
| Emperor's Cup (basketball) (ja) | 2021–22 (ja) | Kawasaki Brave Thunders | 4th | Chiba Jets Funabashi | 2022–23 (ja) | |

| Competition | Season | Champions | Title | Runners-up | Next season | Dates |
League (women)
| Women's Japan Basketball League (W League) | 2021–22 (ja) | Toyota Antelopes | 2nd | Fujitsu Red Wave | 2022–23 (ja) | |
Cup (women)
| Empress's Cup (basketball) (ja) | 2022 (ja) | JX-Eneos Sunflowers | 26th | Denso Iris | 2023 (ja) | |

== Competitions ==
- B.League
- Women's Japan Basketball League
- All Japan Basketball (also known as Emperor's Cup) - Domestic cup (men and women)
- All Japan Intercollegiate Basketball Championship

== Partnership with Australia ==
Since 2018, there has been an ongoing partnership with the Basketball Australia.
