= Shonan Institute of Technology High School =

Coordinates: 35°19′32.6″N 139°27′2.3″E

- 湘南工科大学附属高等学校
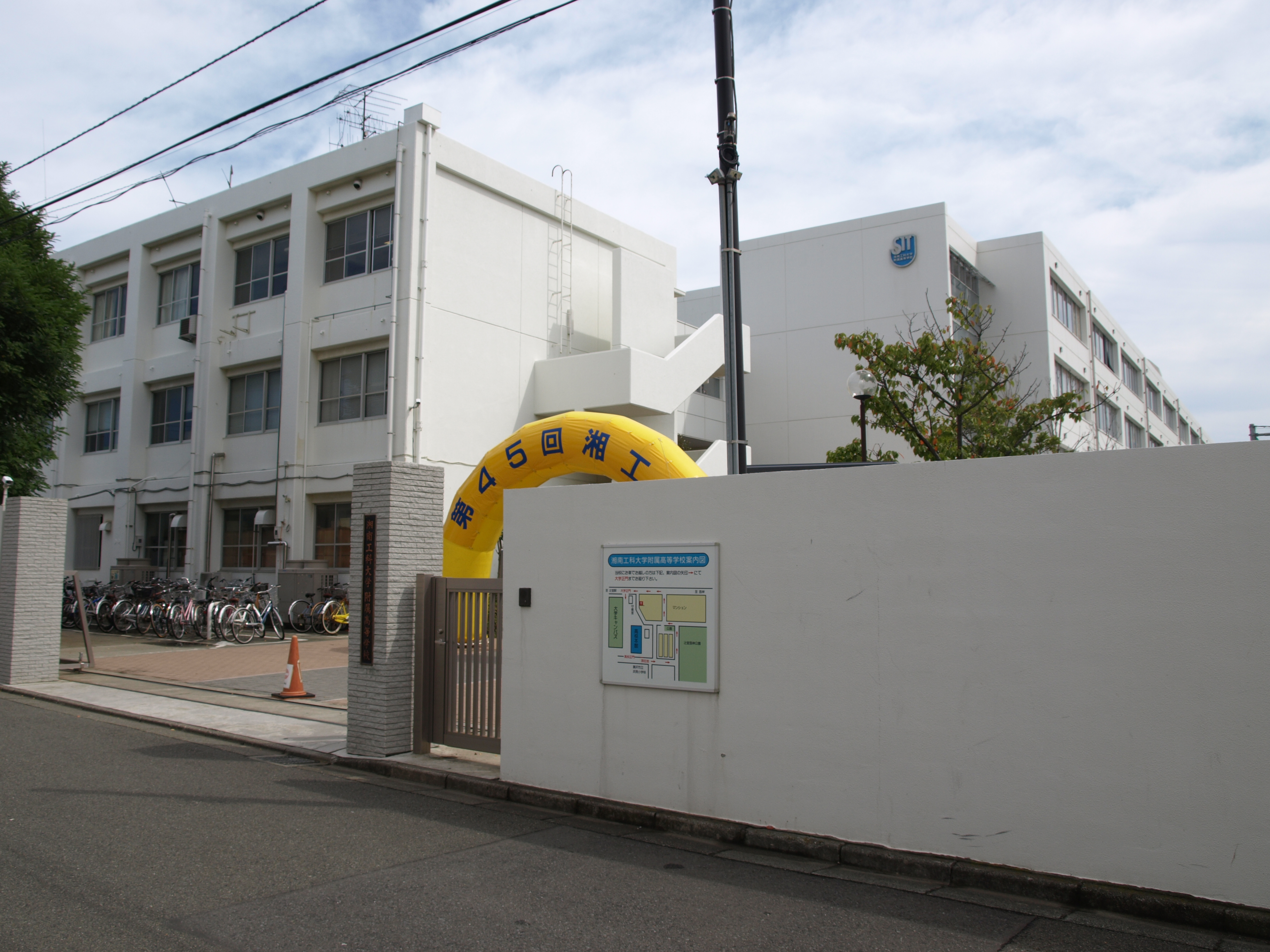

Location
- 1-1-25 Nishi Kaigan, Tsujido, Fujisawa, Kangawa, JAPAN; Fujisawa, Kanagawa, Kanagawa; Japan

Information
- Type: Private
- Established: 1961

Shonan Institute of Technology High School is a high school in Kanagawa, Japan. It was founded in 1961 as high school attached to Shonan Institute of Technology

== History ==
- 1961 - It was founded as Sagami Institute of Technology High School

== Transportation and Location ==
The nearest train station is Tsujidō Station, which is about 1h away from Tokyo station by JR Tokaido-Main-Line. Most of the students take by bus or on foot from station to school as about 1 km away.

== Famous Alumni and Alumnae ==
- Makoto Akaho - a former basketball player
- Yasuhiko Okudera - a former Japanese footballer who played for Sportverein Werder Bremen, 1. FC Köln, Hertha BSC Berlin, and the Japan national football team
- Masahiro Fukuda - a former Japanese footballer who played for Urawa Red Diamonds (as called Mr. Urawa Reds) and the Japan national football team
- Takeshi Hotta- a basketball coach
- Makoto Okita - a former Japanese basketballer
- Makoto Minamiyama - a former Japanese basketballer
- Ai Sugiyama - a former Japanese Pro tennis player
- Kenichiro Kogure - Japan national futsal teamplayer、
- Reiko Nakamura - a Japanese Olympic and Asian record-holding swimmer. | bronze medalist at 2004 Athens Summer Olympics and 2008 Summer Olympics Beijing
- Yukinori Suzuki - a basketball coach

== Model School of Manga ==
- Slam Dunk
