= Nippon Tornadoes =

Japanese basketball team

- League: IBL 2008-2013
- Founded: 2008
- History: Nippon Tornadoes (2009-2013)
- Arena: Travel team
- Location: Matsuyama, Ehime
- Team colors: various
- Ownership: Katsuya Sasaki, Tatsumi Nishida
- Championships: 0

The Nippon Tornadoes (日本 颶風) was a team of the International Basketball League that began play in the 2009 season. A representative team from the Japanese Basketball Academy, the Tornadoes were based in Matsuyama, Ehime, but maintain a national identity and played their full 20-game schedule on the road.

== Notable players ==
- Soichiro Fujitaka
- Tomoyuki Umeda
- Joe Wolfinger

== Coaches ==
- Ryutaro Onodera
- Shinji Tomiyama (asst)
