= Tomoyuki Umeda =

Japanese basketball coach

Personal information
- Born: August 23, 1979 (age 47) Kumamoto, Kumamoto

Career information
- High school: Kumamoto Technical (Kumamoto, Kumamoto)
- Playing career: 2003–2010
- Position: Head coach

Career history

Playing
- 2003-2005: Kumamoto Red Bears
- 2009: Nippon Tornadoes

Coaching
- 2005-?: Kumamoto Red Bears
- 2015-2016: Oita Ehime Heat Devils

Tomoyuki Umeda (梅田智之, Umeda Tomoyuki) is the former Head coach of the Oita Ehime Heat Devils in the Japanese Bj League.

== Head coaching record ==
Legend
Regular season	G	Games coached	W	Games won	L	Games lost	W–L %	Win–loss %
Playoffs	PG	Playoff games	PW	Playoff wins	PL	Playoff losses	PW–L %	Playoff win–loss %

Team	Year	G	W	L	W–L%	Finish	PG	PW	PL	PW–L%	Result
Oita Ehime Heat Devils	2015-16	24	6	18	.250	Fired	-	-	-	–	-
