= L. J. Hepp =

American basketball coach

Personal information
- Born: September 26, 1978 (age 48) Easton, Pennsylvania

Career information
- High school: Leesville Road (Raleigh, North Carolina)
- College: North Carolina (−2003)
- Position: Head coach

Career history

Coaching
- 2001–2003: North Carolina University (asst.)
- 2003–2005: Stanford University (asst)
- 2006–2009: Panther Creek HS
- 2010–11: Oita Heat Devils
- 2013–2014: Panther Creek HS

L. J. Hepp (エル・ジェイ・ヘップ, Eru Jei Heppu) is the former Head coach of the Oita Heat Devils in the Japanese Bj League.

== Head coaching record ==
Legend
Regular season	G	Games coached	W	Games won	L	Games lost	W–L %	Win–loss %
Playoffs	PG	Playoff games	PW	Playoff wins	PL	Playoff losses	PW–L %	Playoff win–loss %

Team	Year	G	W	L	W–L%	Finish	PG	PW	PL	PW–L%	Result
Oita Heat Devils	2010–11	39	16	23	.410	Fired	-	-	-	–	-
