= Martiradonna =

Martiradonna is an Italian surname. Notable people with the surname include:

- Francesca Martiradonna (born 1973), Italian basketball player
- Mario Martiradonna (1938–2011), Italian footballer
