= Sugito =

Sugito 杉戸町
- Town
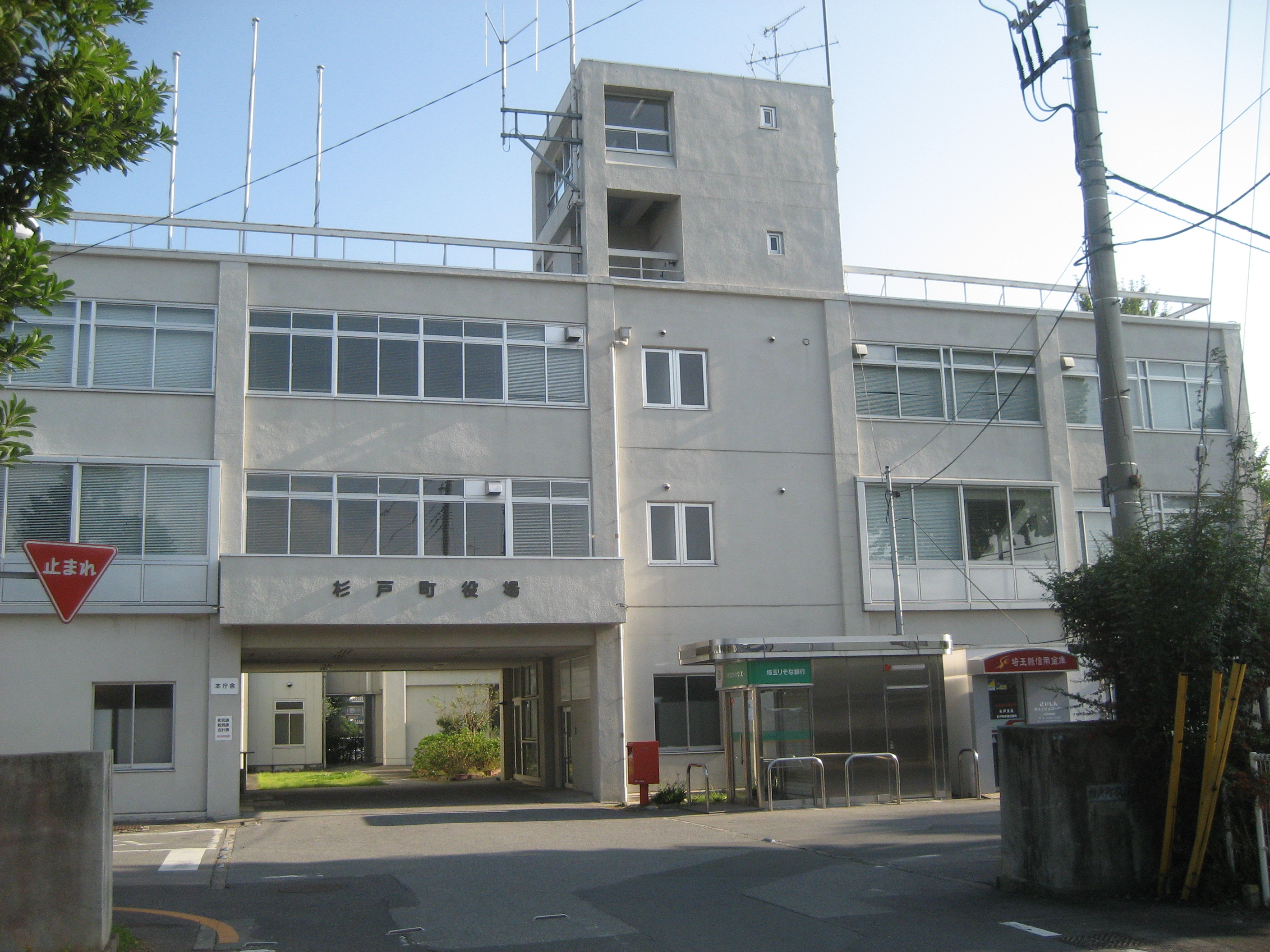
- Sugito town office

- Flag Seal

- Location of Sugito in Saitama Prefecture

- Coordinates: 36°1′32.8″N 139°44′12.2″E
- Country: Japan
- Region: Kantō
- Prefecture: Saitama
- District: Kitakatsushika

Area
  - Total: 30.03 km^{2} (11.59 sq mi)

Population (March 2021)
  - Total: 44,402
  - Density: 1,479/km^{2} (3,830/sq mi)
- Time zone: UTC+9 (Japan Standard Time)
- Tree: Cryptomeria
- Flower: Chrysanthemum
- Phone number: 0480-33-1111
- Address: 2-9-29 Seiji, Sugito-machi, Kitakatsushika-gun, Saitama-ken 345-0025
- Website: Official website

Sugito (杉戸町, Sugito-machi) is a town located in Saitama Prefecture, Japan. As of 1 March 2021, the town had an estimated population of 44,402 in 19,409 households and a population density of 1500 persons per km^{2}. The total area of the town is 30.03 square kilometres (11.59 sq mi).

== Geography ==
Sugito is located in far eastern Saitama Prefecture, in the middle of the Kantō Plain, with an average altitude of 15 meters above sea level. The Edo River flows through the town.

=== Surrounding municipalities ===
Chiba Prefecture

- Noda

Saitama Prefecture

- Kasukabe
- Kuki
- Miyashiro
- Satte

=== Climate ===
Sugito has a humid subtropical climate (Köppen Cfa) characterized by warm summers and cool winters with light to no snowfall. The average annual temperature in Sugito is 14.5 °C. The average annual rainfall is 1408 mm with September as the wettest month. The temperatures are highest on average in August, at around 26.3 °C, and lowest in January, at around 2.8 °C.

== Demographics ==
Per Japanese census data, the population of Sugito peaked around the year 2000 and has declined slightly in the decades since.

Historical population
Year	Pop.	±%
1960	16,457	—
1970	20,244	+23.0%
1980	34,564	+70.7%
1990	40,419	+16.9%
2000	47,336	+17.1%
2010	46,923	−0.9%
2020	43,845	−6.6%

== History ==
Sugito-shuku developed as a post station on the Ōshū Kaidō and the Nikkō Kaidō from the Kamakura period through the Edo period. The town of Sugito was created within Kitakatsushika District, Saitama with the establishment of the modern municipalities system on April 1, 1889. In February 1955, the town expanded by annexing the neighboring villages of Tamiya, Takano, and Teigo.

== Government ==
Sugito has a mayor-council form of government with a directly elected mayor and a unicameral town council of 15 members. Sugito, together with the city of Satte, contributes one member to the Saitama Prefectural Assembly. In terms of national politics, the town is part of Saitama 14th district of the lower house of the Diet of Japan.

== Economy ==
The economy of Sugito is mostly agricultural, with rice, cucumbers, eggplant, onion, Chinese cabbage and wheat among the major crops.

== Education ==
Sugito has six public elementary schools and three public middle schools operated by the town government, and two public high schools operated by the Saitama Prefectural Board of Education. There are also two private high schools.

== Transportation ==
=== Railway ===
Tōbu Railway - Tōbu Nikkō Line

- Sugito-Takanodai

=== Highway ===
- National Route 4

== Sister cities ==
- Busselton, Western Australia, Australia, since November 19, 1996

== Noted people from Sugito ==
- Kaoru Kitamura, author
- Kazuhiro Shoji, basketball coach
