= Matsuyama City General Community Center =

Japanese professional basketball arena

Coordinates: 33°50′09″N 132°45′18″E

- Komisen
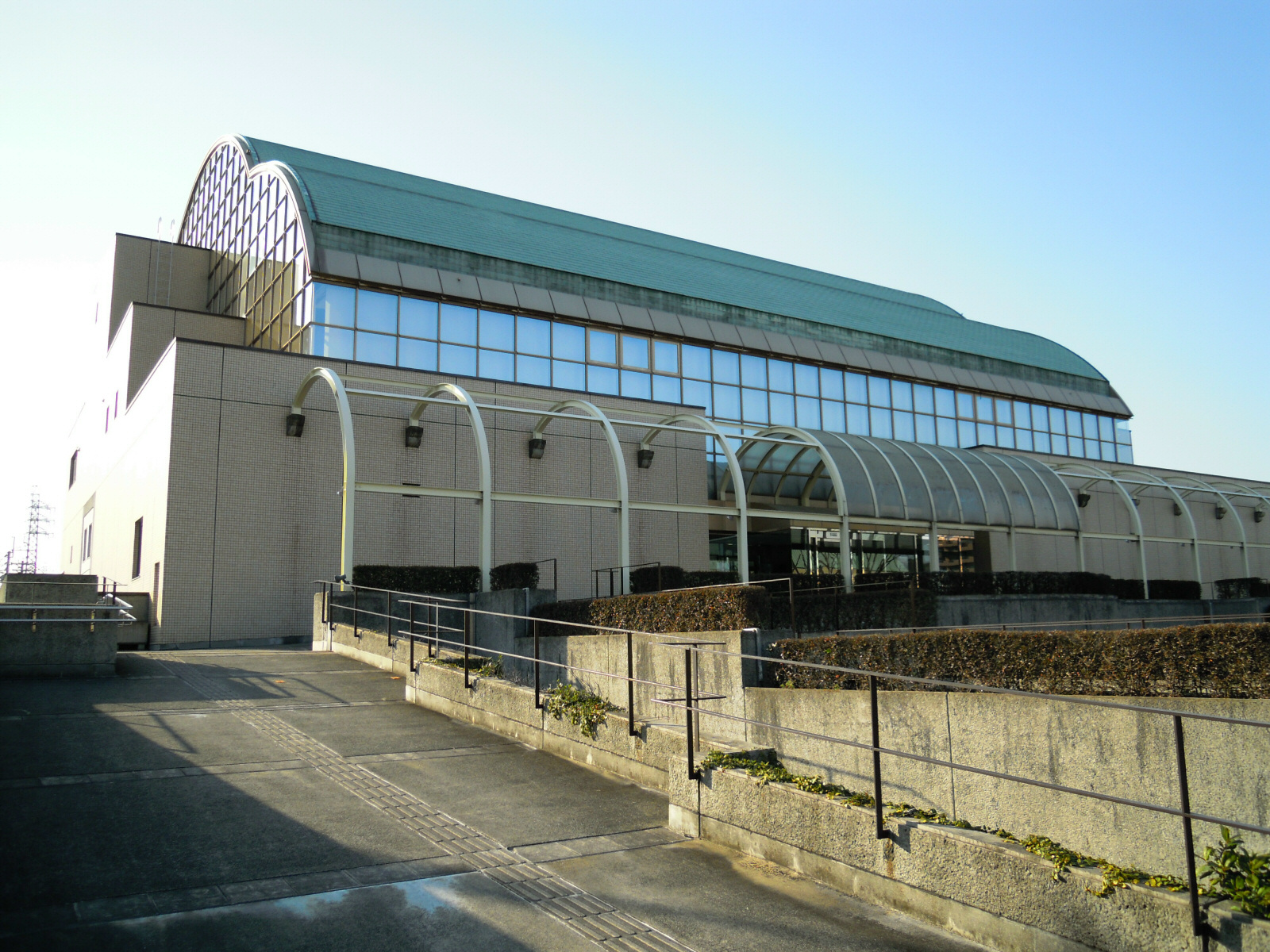
- Interactive map of Matsuyama City General Community Center
- Full name: Matsuyama City General Community Center
- Location: Matsuyama, Ehime, Japan
- Owner: Matsuyama city
- Operator: Matsuyama city

Construction
- Opened: 1987
- Cost

Tenant
- Ehime Orange Vikings

Website
- http://www.cul-spo.or.jp/comcen/

Matsuyama City General Community Center is an arena in Matsuyama, Ehime, Japan. It is the home arena of the Ehime Orange Vikings of the B.League, Japan's professional basketball league.

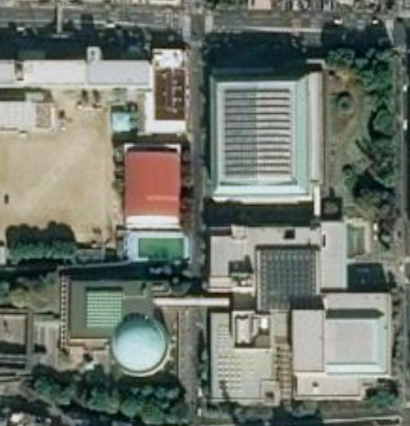
Satellite view
