= Kanazawa City General Gymnasium =

Arena in Kanazawa, Ishikawa, Japan

Coordinates: 36°32′23.8″N 136°39′0.7″E

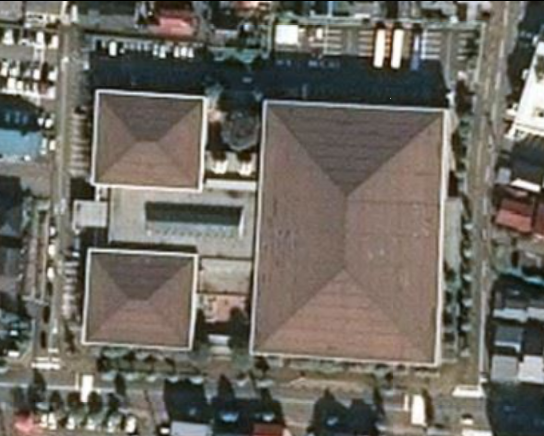

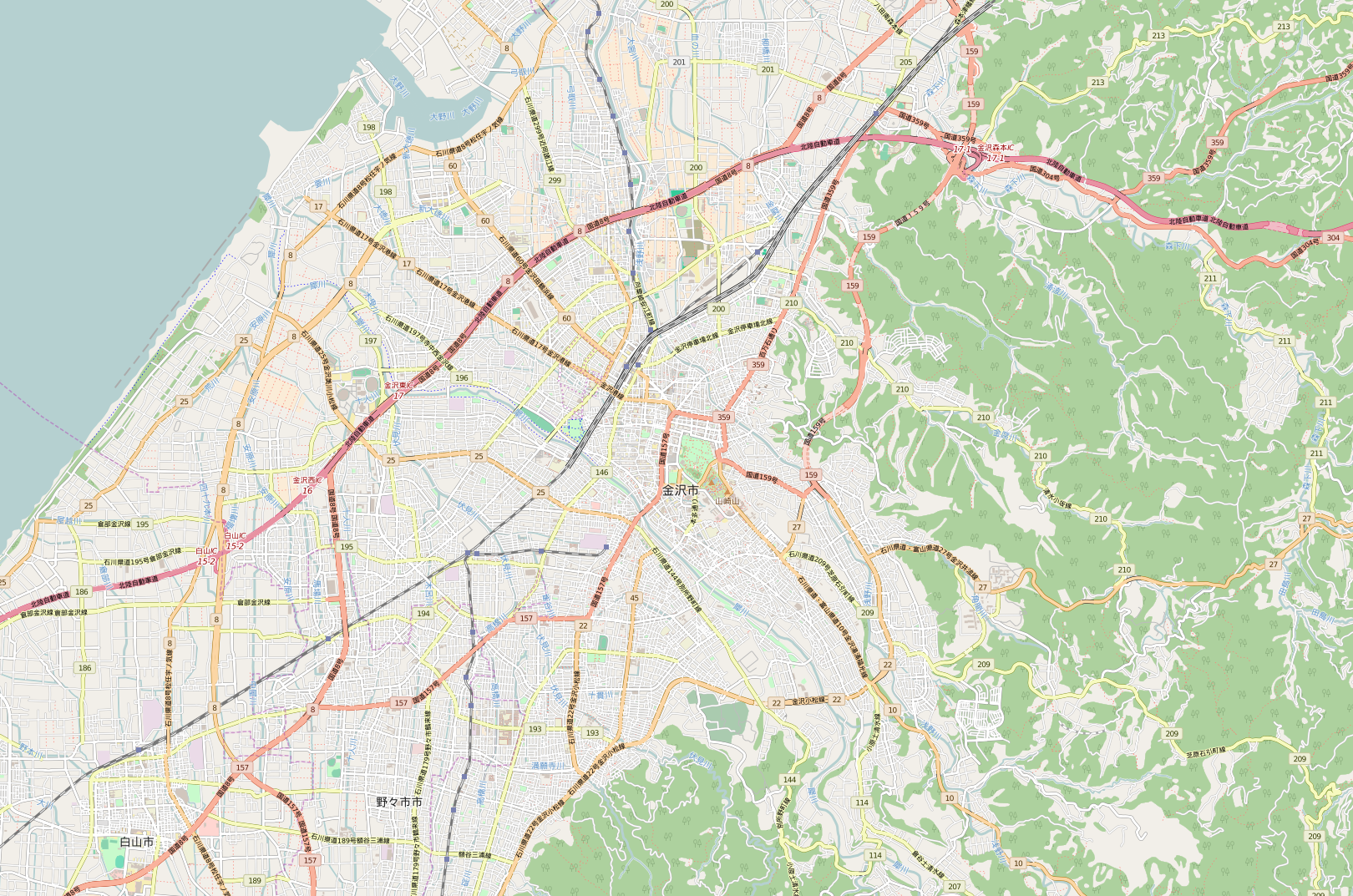
- Location within Kanazawa, Ishikawa Location within Ishikawa Prefecture Location within Japan
- Interactive map of Kanazawa City General Gymnasium
- Full name: Kanazawa City General Gymnasium
- Location: Kanazawa, Ishikawa, Japan
- Owner: Kanazawa city
- Operator: Kanazawa city
- Capacity: 2,312

Construction
- Opened: 1985
- Cost

Tenant
- Kanazawa Samuraiz

Kanazawa City General Gymnasium is an arena in Kanazawa, Ishikawa, Japan. It is the home arena of the Kanazawa Samuraiz of the B.League, Japan's professional basketball league.
