= Takeo Mabashi =

Japanese basketball player and coach

Ehime Orange Vikings
- Position: Head coach
- League: B.League

Personal information
- Born: April 20, 1971 (age 55) Sendai, Miyagi

Career information
- High school: Sendai (Sendai, Miyagi)
- College: Tohoku Gakuin University
- Playing career: 1994–1997

Career history

Playing
- 1994-1997: Bosch Blue Winds

Coaching
- 2002-2005: Tohoku Gakuin University (asst.)
- 2005-2008: Sendai 89ers (asst)
- 2013: Sendai 89ers
- 2016-2017: Sendai 89ers
- 2019-2020: Bambitious Nara (asst)
- 2020-present: Bambitious Nara

Takeo Mabashi (間橋健生, Mabashi Takeo) is a Japanese professional basketball head coach and former player.

== Head coaching record ==
Legend
Regular season	G	Games coached	W	Games won	L	Games lost	W–L %	Win–loss %
Playoffs	PG	Playoff games	PW	Playoff wins	PL	Playoff losses	PW–L %	Playoff win–loss %

Team	Year	G	W	L	W–L%	Finish	PG	PW	PL	PW–L%	Result
Sendai 89ers	2013	18	7	11	.389	7th in Eastern	-	-	-	–	-
Sendai 89ers	2016-17	60	14	46	.233	6th in Eastern	-	-	-	–	relegated to B2
