= Makoto Akaho =

Japanese basketball player (born 1971)

Career information
- High school: Shonan Institute of Technology High School
- College: Nippon Sport Science University
Medals
Men's basketball
Representing Japan
Summer Universiade
Silver medal – second place	1995 Fukuoka	Japan

Makoto Akaho (赤穂 真, Akaho Makoto; born 6 July 1971) is a Japanese former basketball player.
