= Kanazawa Samuraiz =

Japanese basketball club

- Division: Third
- Leagues: B.League
- Founded: 2015; 11 years ago
- History: 2015–present
- Arena: Kanazawa City General Gymnasium
- Capacity: 2,312
- Location: Kanazawa, Ishikawa Prefecture, Japan
- Team colors: Gold, Black
- Main sponsor: Hokkoku Shimbun
- President: Hidemitsu Nakano
- Head coach: Hidesuke Kuroshima
- Ownership: Hokuriku Sports Promotion Council Ltd.
- Website: http://www.samuraiz.jp/
Home	Away

Kanazawa Samuraiz (Japanese: 金沢武士団, romanized: Kanazawa Samuraizu) is a Japanese professional basketball club based in Kanazawa. The team most recently competed in the third division of the B.League. Starting from the 2026–27 season, the team will compete in the B.League One, the league's second division, as a member of the Central Conference.

== Team ==
=== Current roster ===
Note: Flags indicate national team eligibility at FIBA-sanctioned events. Players may hold other non-FIBA nationalities not displayed.

Kanazawa Samuraiz roster
Players
Coaches

Pos.	No.	Nat.	Name
PG	0	(Japan)	Yugo Okuda
SG	1	(Japan)	Riku Motozawa
PG	3	(Ukraine)	Igor Boyarkin
SG	4	(Ukraine)	Yakiv Titov
SG	6	(Japan)	Adebanjo William
F	7	(Japan)	Hikaru Yamashita
PG	8	(Japan)	Fumiya Yamamoto
C	10	(Japan)	Kota Yamamoto
PG	11	(Japan)	Shodai Tanaka (C)
PG	12	(Japan)	Shimon Tanaka
PF	13	(Ukraine)	Oleksandr Antypov
PG	17	(Japan)	Gwang Sung Lee
SG	18	(Japan)	Ayumu Ichihashi
PG	20	(Japan)	Akitoshi Oguri
PF	21	(Japan)	Takuto Kubo
SF	32	(Japan)	Tomoki Kuriyama
SF	33	(Japan)	Kakeru Kanakubo

Head coach

(Japan) Hidessuke Kuroshima

Assistant coach(es)

(Japan) Akira Saito

Legend

- (C) Team captain
- Injured

- Roster
Updated: 13 February 2023

== Notable players ==
- (The Bahamas) Gjio Bain
- (United States) Tony Bishop
- (United States) Denzel Bowles
- (United States) Marshall Brown
- (United States) Luke Evans (fr)
- (Kosovo) Drilon Hajrizi
- (United States) Andre Murray ([tl])
- (Panama) (United States) Gyno Pomare
- (Czech Republic) Kenneth Simms

== Coaches ==
- Yukinori Suzuki
- Takeshi Hotta
- Kenshiro Ametani

== Arenas ==
- Kanazawa City General Gymnasium
- Ishikawa General Sports Center
- Matto General Sports Park Gymnasium
- Kaga City Sports Center
- Nanao City Citizens Gymnasium
- Shika Town General Gymnasium
