= Region Plaza Joetsu =

Multi-purpose facilities in Jōetsu, Niigata, Japan

Coordinates: 37°9′15.9″N 138°15′5.2″E

Region Plaza Jōetsu
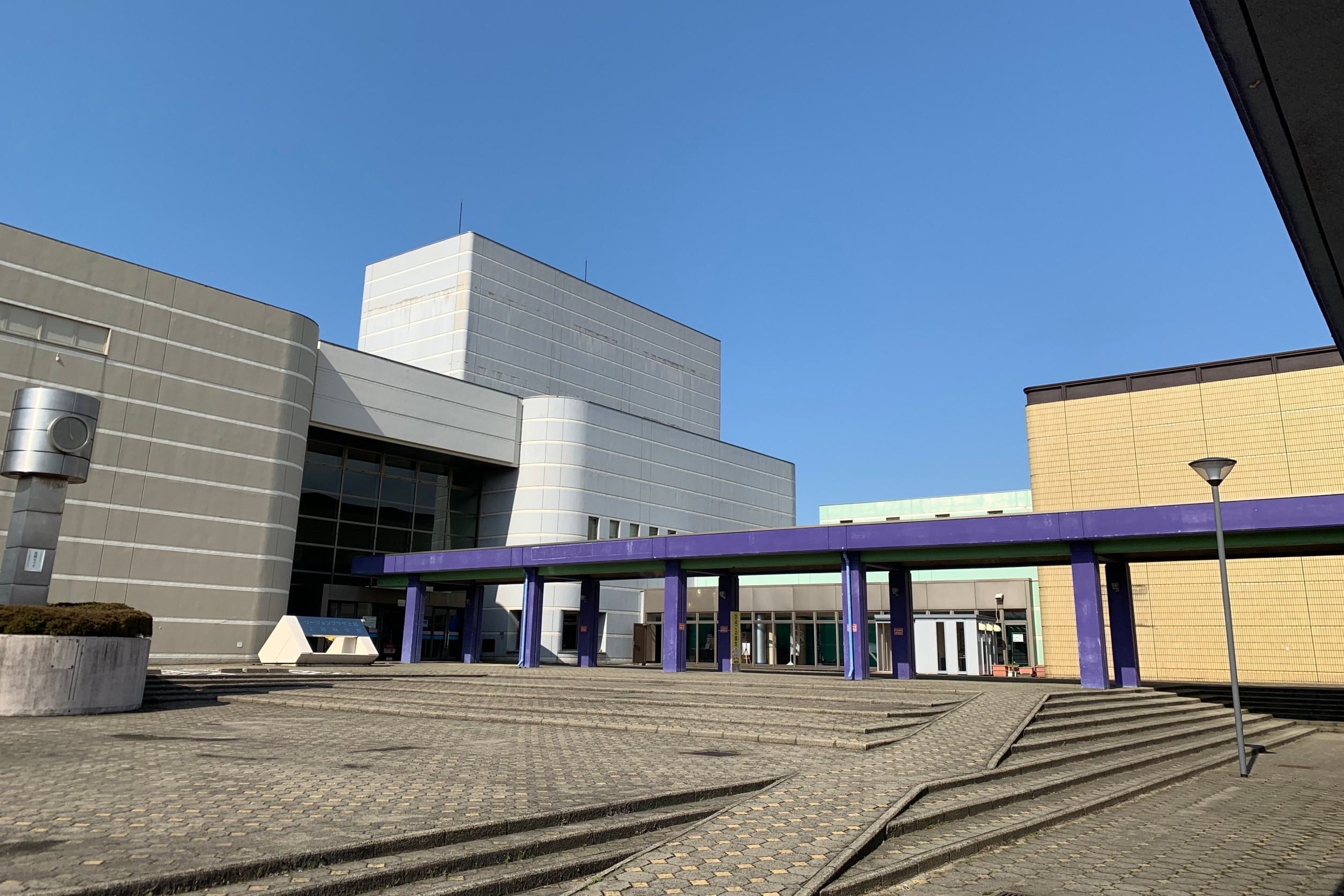
- April 2020
- Interactive map of Region Plaza Jōetsu
- Full name: Region Plaza Jōetsu
- Location: Joetsu, Niigata, Japan
- Owner: Jōetsu city
- Operator: Shinto Industries
- Capacity: Indoor stadium 3,468; Ice Arena 228; Concert hall 477

Construction
- Opened: 1984
- Cost: JPY 4.116 billion
- Architects: Ishimoto Architectural & Engineering
- Main contractor: Hazama Corporation

Website
- https://region-joetsu.jp/

Region Plaza Joetsu is the multi-purpose facilities in Jōetsu, Niigata, Japan.
