= Sendai 89ers =

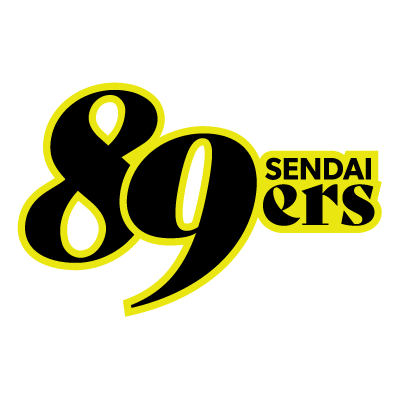
- Conference: East
- Division: First
- Leagues: B.League
- History: 2005–present
- Arena: Xebio Arena Sendai
- Capacity: 5,700
- Location: Sendai
- Main sponsor: Seven x Seven
- President: Takehiko Shimura
- Team manager: Nonoka Sakurada
- Head coach: Dan Tacheny
- Ownership: Kasumigaseki Capital
- Website: www.89ers.jp
Home	Away	3rd

The Sendai 89ers (仙台89ERS, Sendai Eitinaināzu) are a Japanese professional basketball team based in Sendai. The team competes in the B.League Premier, the highest division of the B.League, as a member of the Eastern Conference. The team plays its home games at Xebio Arena Sendai. The team name is based on the year of the city's incorporation, 1889.

== Current roster ==
Note: Flags indicate national team eligibility at FIBA-sanctioned events. Players may hold other non-FIBA nationalities not displayed.

Sendai 89ers roster
Players
Coaches

Pos.	No.	Nat.	Name	Ht.	Age
G	7	(Japan)	Seiya Funyu	1.95 m (6 ft 5 in)	32 – 15 December 1993
C	21	(Senegal)	Boubacar Toure	2.13 m (7 ft 0 in)	30 – 31 December 1995
F	8	(United States)	Jarrett Culver	1.98 m (6 ft 6 in)	27 – 20 February 1999
G	9	(Lebanon)	Sergio El Darwich	1.94 m (6 ft 4 in)	29 – 25 July 1996
F	14	(Japan)	Yusei Sugiura	1.96 m (6 ft 5 in)	31 – 24 June 1995
G	15	(Japan)	Shota Watanabe	1.68 m (5 ft 6 in)	27 – 24 November 1998
F	75	(Japan)	Soichiro Inoue	2.01 m (6 ft 7 in)	27 – 7 May 1999
F/C	45	(United States)	Nathan Boothe	2.08 m (6 ft 10 in)	32 – 3 February 1994
G	3	(Japan)	Kazuma Okajima	1.71 m (5 ft 7 in)	22 – 29 October 2003
G	11	(Japan)	Hirohide Araya	1.89 m (6 ft 2 in)	27 – 5 December 1998
F	23	(Japan)	Ryota Hanzawa	1.92 m (6 ft 4 in)	26 – 10 January 2000
F	24	(Japan)	Kosei Niinuma	1.94 m (6 ft 4 in)	23 – 3 March 2003
G	77	(Japan)	Rowa Tanno	1.76 m (5 ft 9 in)	18 – 31 October 2007
G	96	(Japan)	Masato Abe	1.81 m (5 ft 11 in)	18 – 6 September 2007

Head coach

(United States) Dan Tacheny

Assistant coach(es)

Jeff Trepagnier
Yosuke Machida

Legend

- (C) Team captain
- Injured

- Roster
Updated: December 24, 2025

== Coaches ==
- Honoo Hamaguchi (2005–11)
- Bob Pierce (2011–13)
- Takeo Mabashi
- Shuto Kawachi
- Toshihiro Goto
- Daisuke Takaoka
- Dai Oketani
- Hiroki Fujita
- Yoshiro Ochiai
- Dan Tacheny

== Notable players ==
- Olu Ashaolu
- Jamal Boykin
- Mike Chappell
- Kevin Coble
- Marcus Cousin
- T. J. Cummings
- Jeral Davis
- Nick DeWitz
- Daniel Fitzgerald
- Chris Holm
- Kaito Ishikawa
- Travele Jones
- Greg Mangano
- Jerome Meyinsse
- Adrian Moss
- (Finland) Erik Murphy
- Tshilidzi Nephawe
- Kenichi Takahashi
- Wendell White
- Terrence Woodyard

== Arenas ==
- Xebio Arena Sendai
- Kamei Arena Sendai
- Minamisanriku Town General Gymnasium

== Practice facilities ==
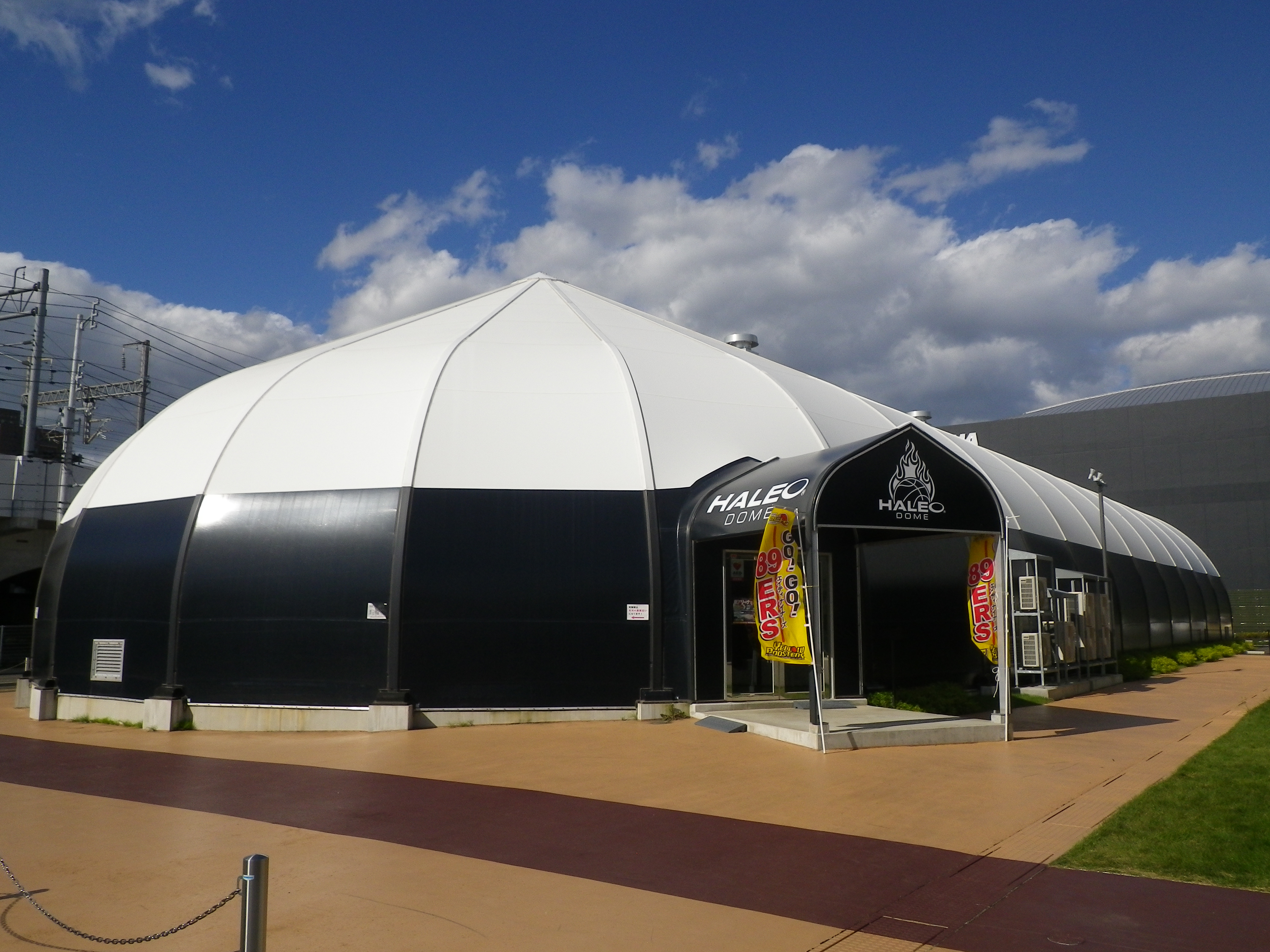
Haleo Dome

- Haleo Dome - Homepage
- Meisen Basketball Laboratory

== Academy Director ==
- Makoto Kato (fr)
