= Niigata Albirex BB =

Professional basketball team in Nagaoka, Niigata Prefecture, Japan

- Leagues: B.League
- Founded: 1954; 72 years ago
- Arena: City Hall Plaza Aore Nagaoka
- Location: Nagaoka, Niigata
- Team colors: Orange and Blue
- Main sponsor: Sanko Seika
- Championships: 2
- Website: www.albirex.com
Home	Away

Niigata Albirex BB (新潟アルビレックスBB (Nīgata Aubirekkusu BB)) is a Japanese professional basketball team based in Nagaoka, Niigata Prefecture. The team most recently competed in the third division of the B.League. Starting from the 2026–27 season, the team will compete in the B.League One, the league's second division, as a member of the Central Conference.

== Outline ==
The club was founded in 1954 as the company team of Daiwa Securities, a Tokyo-based securities brokerage. In 1991, it joined the Japan Basketball League. In 2000, the company club was dissolved after NSG purchased it, and the club was moved before the 2000–2001 season to Niigata and renamed Albirex.

In 2004, it joined the bj league along with five other clubs.

=== Team name transition ===
- 1954: The Daiwa Securities basketball club
- 1994: The Daiwa Securities Hotblizzards
- 2000: Niigata Albirex
- 2006: Niigata Albirex basketball

== Roster ==
Niigata Albirex BB roster
Players
Coaches

Pos.	No.	Nat.	Name	Ht.	Age
G	2	(Japan)	Oluwadamilola Yuta Joseph Mosaku	1.93 m (6 ft 4 in)	24 – 5 December 2001
G	3	(Japan)	Reon Shibuta	1.75 m (5 ft 9 in)	28 – 22 August 1998
G	5	(Japan)	Daichi Tomioka	1.65 m (5 ft 5 in)	31 – 8 February 1995
G	10	(Japan)	Tensho Sugimoto	1.86 m (6 ft 1 in)	28 – 20 July 1998
G	14	(Japan)	Keigo Kimura	1.88 m (6 ft 2 in)	26 – 8 November 2000
G	17	(Japan)	Shun Watanuki	1.78 m (5 ft 10 in)	39 – 2 November 1987
F	25	(Hungary)	Rosco Allen	2.08 m (6 ft 10 in)	33 – 5 May 1993
F	32	(Japan)	Yuichi Ikeda	1.91 m (6 ft 3 in)	43 – 13 July 1983
G	34	(Japan)	Zen Endo	1.82 m (6 ft 0 in)	28 – 5 November 1998
F	65	(Japan)	Shogo Tamaki	1.95 m (6 ft 5 in)	30 – 30 August 1996

Head coach

Casey Owens

Assistant coach(es)

Takamitsu Fujiwara

Legend

- (C) Team captain
- Injured

- Roster

== Notable players ==
- Dokun Akingbade
- Zach Andrews
- Wayne Arnold
- David Benoit
- Jared Berggren
- Suleiman Braimoh
- Paul Butorac
- Russell Carter
- Clint Chapman
- Kofi Cockburn
- Bennet Davis
- Mark Davis
- Nick Davis
- Nick DeWitz
- Ronald Draper
- Austin Dufault
- Davante Gardner
- Lamont Hamilton
- Reggie Hamilton
- Makoto Hasegawa
- Ben Handlogten
- Charles Hinkle
- Chris Holm
- Kei Igarashi
- Issa Konare
- George Leach
- Tyrone Levett
- Erron Maxey
- Eric McArthur
- Ryosuke Mizumachi
- Tod Murphy
- Chris Oliver
- Ryan Reid
- Kazuhiro Shoji
- Andre Smith
- Greg Stolt
- Patrick Sullivan
- Michael Takahashi
- Akitomo Takeno
- Antoni Wyche

== Coaches ==
- Osamu Kuraishi
- Matt Garrison
- Fujitaka Hiraoka
- Kazuo Nakamura
- Kazuhiro Shoji
- Shogo Fukuda

== Honors ==
- Japan Basketball League Div.2
  - Champions (2) : 2000/2001, 2001/2002
- bj league
  - Runners-up (1) : 2005/2006
- Asia Professional Basketball Invitation Tournament
  - 4th Place (1) : 2006

== Season-by-season records ==
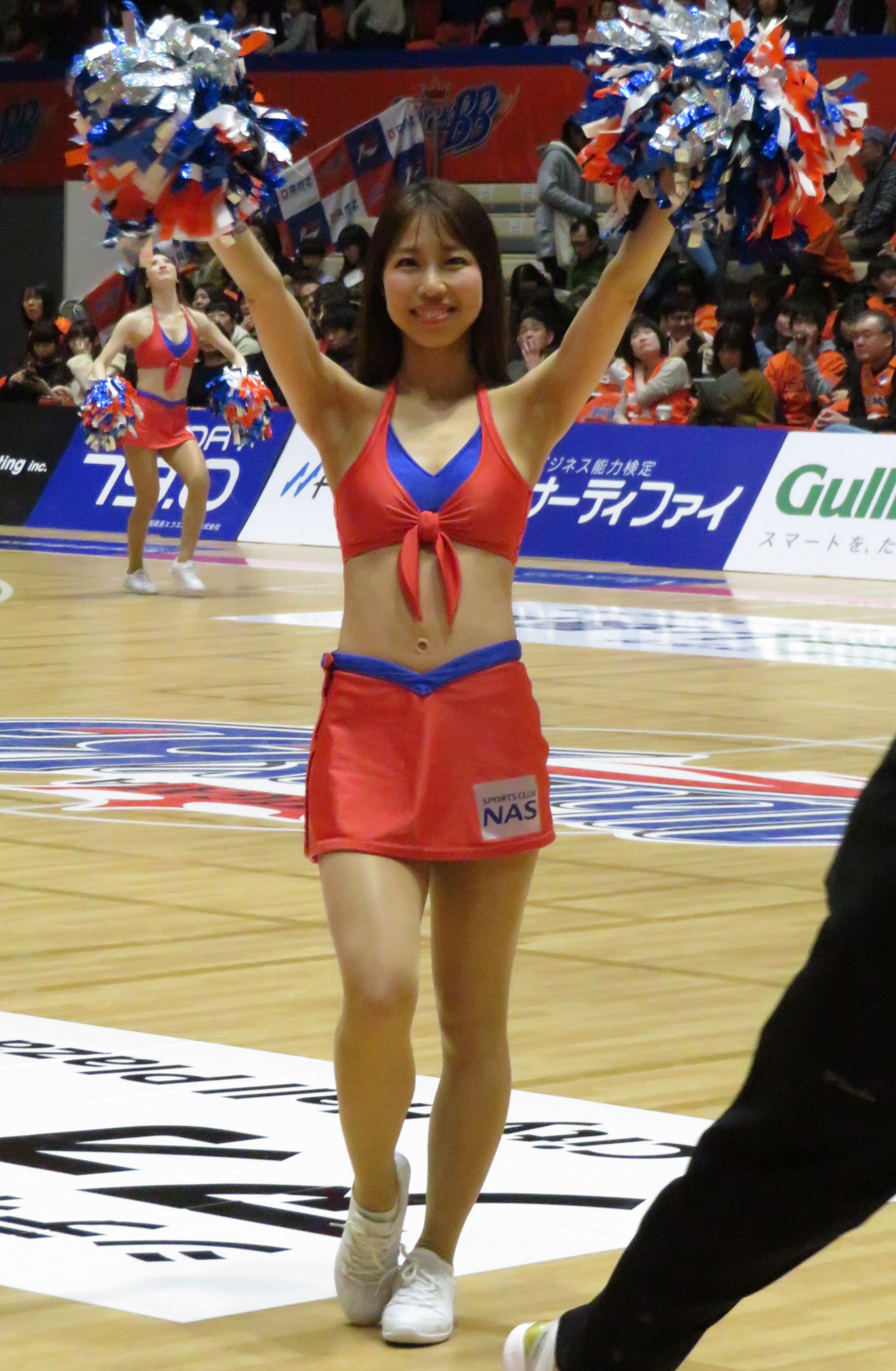
Cheering on the team to victory.

Year	League	Division	Regular Season			Semifinal		Final		Finish
Year	League	Division	Win	Lose	Place	Win	Lose	Win	Lose	Finish
2000	JBL	2	12	2	2nd	1	0	1	0	Champions
2001/2002	JBL		14	0	1st	2	0	2	1	Champions
2002/2003	JBL Super League		2	9	6th	---				6th
2003/2004	JBL Super League		9	19	8th	---				8th
2004/2005	JBL Super League		8	20	7th	---				7th
Season	League		Regular Season					Finish		Average Crowd
Season	League		Win	Lose	Win%	GB	Place	Finish		Average Crowd
2005/2006	bj league		29	11	.725	2.0	2nd	Runners-up		-
2006/2007	bj league		25	15	.625	4.0	2nd	4th		3,008
2007/2008	bj league		26	18	.591	3.0	East 3rd	6th		3,259
2008/2009	bj league		24	28	.462	12.0	East 4th			-

Key:

- Win%: Winning percentage
- GB: Games behind

== Arenas ==
- City Hall Plaza Aore Nagaoka
- Niigata City Higashi General Sports Center
- Region Plaza Joetsu

== Practice facilities ==
- Nakanoshima Gymnasium
