= B.League =

Japanese professional basketball league

- Organising body: Japan Professional Basketball League
- Founded: April 1, 2015; 11 years ago
- First season: 2016–17
- Country: Japan
- Federation: Japan Basketball Association
- Confederation: FIBA Asia
- Divisions: B.League Premier; B.League One; B.League Next
- Number of teams: 26 (B.League Premier); 25 (B.League One); 4 (B.League Next)
- Level on pyramid: 1–3
- Feeder to: East Asia Super League
- Current champions: B1: Nagasaki Velca (1st title); B2: Kobe Storks (2nd title); B3: Tachikawa Dice (1st title) (2025–26)
- Most championships: B1: Utsunomiya Brex (3 titles); B2: Kobe Storks (2 titles); B3: Yokohama Excellence (2 titles)
- President: Shinji Shimada
- TV partners: NHK
- Website: BLeague.jp
- 2026–27 B.League Premier season

The B.League is a men's professional basketball league in Japan. The league is operated by the Japan Professional Basketball League and was formed as a result of a merger between the National Basketball League that was operated by the FIBA-affiliated Japan Basketball Association and the independently operated bj league. The merger had been mandated by FIBA as a condition to Japan having its membership resumed following suspension in November 2014. The league began play in September 2016.

== History ==
=== Background ===
The Japan Basketball Association was formed in 1930 and has operated Japan's top basketball leagues under various names since 1967. Throughout the history of the association, teams have been affiliated with large corporations and players have been employed by their respective owner company rather than competing as professional basketball players. In the early 1990s soccer in Japan moved away from a similar corporate structure and launched the J.League in 1993. The JBA commenced investigating the professionalization of basketball in the same year, and in 1997 lifted the ban on professional players. Despite this, the structure of the Japan Super League remained amateur in nature, with most teams remaining under the control of a corporate sponsor/owner.

In 2005 a rival bj league was launched in competition with the Super League, based on an American franchise system of professional teams. In response, the JBA re-launched the Super League as the Japan Basketball League (JBL) in 2007, but there was still a mixture of professional and corporate teams in the competition. The JBL was again rebranded as the National Basketball League in 2013. Since the establishment of the bj league in 2005, both competitions rapidly expanded the number of teams, with 45 teams participating between the two competitions in 2015.

FIBA, the international governing body for basketball, grew concerned with the division and disorganization of the sport within the country. After the JBA failed to comply with deadlines to commence reorganizing the domestic leagues, FIBA suspended Japan from international competitions in November 2014. A task force to investigate the reformation of the domestic leagues was formed and Saburō Kawabuchi was appointed co-chairman. In May 2015, upon FIBA's recommendation, Kawabuchi was appointed as president of the JBA. The merger of the two competing leagues into the B.League was announced in June 2015 and the international suspension was lifted by FIBA in August. Telecommunications company Softbank was named as the league's top sponsor for the inaugural season in March 2016.

=== 2016–2026: First decade ===
B.League logo from 2016 to 2026.

The 2016–17 season commenced with an inaugural match between four-time JBL/NBL champions Alvark Tokyo, who finished on top of the NBL ladder in 2015–16, and four-time bj-league champions Ryukyu Golden Kings, who won the 2015–16 bj-league championship, at Yoyogi National Gymnasium on 22 September 2016. A full round of games involving all other teams commenced on September 24.

Since the 2021–22 season, the winners and runners-up of each season qualify for the East Asia Super League.

=== 2026–present: Restructuring ===
Starting from the 2026–27 season, the B.League will undergo a major structural change. The top division, B1, will be renamed to B.League Premier with 26 permanent member teams and no promotion and relegation between it and the lower divisions. For competitive balance, a salary cap of ¥800 million will be implemented, and the highest-paid player on each team will count as ¥150 million towards the cap even if the player's salary is higher. The lower divisions, B2 and B3, will be renamed to B.League One and B.League Next, respectively.

== Season format ==
Starting from the 2026–27 season, the B.League will consist of three divisions. The highest division is B.League Premier, composed of 26 teams split into two conferences. The second division is B.League One, composed of 25 teams split into five conferences. The third division is B.League Next, currently composed of four teams. Each league has specific requirements for teams to be licensed to compete in each division.

The formats for each new division have yet to be unveiled. For reference, these were the formats of the two highest divisions in the 2025–26 season:

=== First Division (B1) ===
In the first division, each team plays a 60-game regular-season schedule that consists of 36 games against teams within their conference (4 games against each team) and 24 games against teams in the other conference (2 games against eight teams and 4 games against the remaining two teams). Eight teams qualify for the playoffs, including the top three teams from each conference, and the next two teams with the best records, regardless of their conference, as wild cards. The playoffs consist of the quarterfinal, semifinal, and final rounds, with a best-of-three format in each round. Each round is played at the team's home court, which finished with the higher winning percentage during the season.

=== Second Division (B2) ===
In the second division, the regular season will also consist of a 60-game schedule, but with 42 games against teams within their own conference (6 games against each team) and 18 games against teams in the other conference (2 games against seven teams and 4 games against the remaining team). The playoff qualification and match format is identical to the first division: Eight teams qualify for the playoffs, which includes the top three teams from each conference, and the next two teams with the best records, regardless of their conference, as wild cards. The playoffs consist of quarterfinal, semifinal, and final rounds, with a best-of-three format in each round. Each round is played at the home court of the team that finished with the higher winning percentage during the season.

== Current clubs ==
In the 2014–15 season, there were 12 teams in the NBL, 10 teams in the National Basketball Development League (NBDL, the NBL's second division league) and 24 teams in the bj-league. All 46 teams sought entrance to the B.League's inaugural 2016–17 season, along with the Wakayama Trians, who withdrew from the NBL in January 2015 due to financial difficulty. Ultimately, all clubs were accepted into the league except for the Trians and the Hiroshima Lightning, who were in their first season as a bj-league expansion club. The allocation of the 45 teams into three divisions was announced in two phases in July and August 2015. In April 2016 the league announced rules regarding official team names, shortened names and abbreviations to be used by the clubs. A list of names to be used by each club in the 2016–17 season was also published. Beginning in the 2020–21 season, the B.League was reformatted to only have two conferences each, East and West, in the first and second divisions. However, the first division reverted to a three-conference system, East, Central, and West, beginning in the 2022–23 season.

On October 31, 2025, the league announced the divisions of all 55 member teams at that time, with 26 teams assigned to Premier, 25 assigned to One, and only four to Next.

=== B.League Premier (26 teams) ===
Locations of the B.League Premier teams
Eastern Conference
Western Conference
Locations of the B.League Premier Kanto teams
Locations of the B.League Premier Kansai and Tokai teams

Conference	Team	Location	Arena	Capacity	Founded	Joined (Note: Also includes tenure in the B3 League, the current B.League Next.)
East	Akita Northern Happinets	Akita, Akita	CNA Arena Akita	5,000	2010	2016
East	Altiri Chiba	Chiba, Chiba	Chiba Port Arena	7,512	2020	2021
East	Alvark Tokyo	Kōtō, Tokyo	Toyota Arena Tokyo	10,000	1948	2016
East	Chiba Jets	Funabashi, Chiba	Lala Arena Tokyo-Bay	11,000	2005	2016
East	Gunma Crane Thunders	Ōta, Gunma	Open House Arena Ota	5,000	2011	2016
East	Ibaraki Robots	Mito, Ibaraki	Adastria Mito Arena	5,000	2013	2016
East	Kawasaki Brave Thunders	Kawasaki, Kanagawa	Kawasaki Todoroki Arena	6,500	1950	2016
East	Levanga Hokkaido	Sapporo, Hokkaido	Hokkai Kitayell	8,000	2006	2016
East	Sendai 89ers	Sendai, Miyagi	Xebio Arena Sendai	5,038	2005	2016
East	Tokyo Sunrockers	Kōtō, Tokyo	Toyota Arena Tokyo	10,000	1935	2016
East	Toyama Grouses	Toyama, Toyama	Toyama City Gymnasium	5,006	2005	2016
East	Utsunomiya Brex	Utsunomiya, Tochigi	Brex Arena Utsunomiya	2,900	2007	2016
East	Yokohama B-Corsairs	Yokohama, Kanagawa	Yokohama International Swimming Pool	5,000	2010	2016
West	Hiroshima Dragonflies	Hiroshima, Hiroshima	Hiroshima Sun Plaza	6,052	2013	2016
West	Kobe Storks	Kobe, Hyogo	Glion Arena Kobe	10,168	2011	2016
West	Kyoto Hannaryz	Kyoto, Kyoto	Kyoto City Gymnasium	4,000	2009	2016
West	Nagasaki Velca	Nagasaki, Nagasaki	Happiness Arena	6,000	2020	2021
West	Nagoya Diamond Dolphins	Nagoya, Aichi	IG Arena	17,000	1950	2016
West	Osaka Evessa	Osaka, Osaka	Ookini Arena Maishima	7,056	2004	2016
West	Ryukyu Golden Kings	Okinawa, Okinawa	Okinawa Suntory Arena	10,000	2007	2016
West	Saga Ballooners	Saga, Saga	Saga Arena	8,400	2018	2019
West	San-en NeoPhoenix	Toyohashi, Aichi	Toyohashi City General Gymnasium	3,500	1965	2016
West	SeaHorses Mikawa	Kariya, Aichi	Wing Arena Kariya	2,376	1947	2016
West	Shiga Lakes	Ōtsu, Shiga	Shiga Daihatsu Arena	5,000	2008	2016
West	Shimane Susanoo Magic	Matsue, Shimane	Matsue City General Gymnasium	4,550	2009	2016
West	Shinshu Brave Warriors	Chikuma, Nagano	White Ring	7,000	2011	2016

=== B.League One (25 teams) ===
Locations of the B.League One teams
North Conference
East Conference
Central Conference
West Conference
South Conference
Locations of the B.League One Kanto teams

Conference	Team	Location	Arena	Capacity	Founded	Joined
North	Aomori Wat's	Aomori, Aomori	Kakuhiro Group Super Arena	2,596	2012	2016
North	Fukushima Firebonds	Kōriyama, Fukushima	Horaiya Bonds Arena	5,013	2013	2016
North	Iwate Big Bulls	Morioka, Iwate	Morioka Takaya Arena	5,058	2010	2016
North	Koshigaya Alphas	Koshigaya, Saitama	Koshigaya Municipal General Gymnasium	4,472	1997	2016
North	Yamagata Wyverns	Tendō, Yamagata	Yamagata Prefectural General Sports Park Gymnasium	3,976	2009	2016
East	Earthfriends Tokyo Z	Ōta, Tokyo	Ebara Wave Arena Ota	4,012	2014	2016
East	Saitama Broncos	Tokorozawa, Saitama	Urawa Komaba Gymnasium	1,374	1982	2016
East	Tachikawa Dice	Tachikawa, Tokyo	Arena Tachikawa Tachihi	3,000	2021	2022
East	Tokyo Hachioji Bee Trains	Hachiōji, Tokyo	Ésforta Arena Hachiōji	2,000	2012	2016
East	Tokyo United BC	Kōtō, Tokyo	Ariake Arena	15,000	2021	2022
Central	Fukui Blowinds	Fukui, Fukui	Fukui Prefectural Gymnasium	3,975	2023	
Central	Gifu Swoops	Gifu, Gifu	OKB Gifu Seiryu Arena	3,500	2003	2018
Central	Kanazawa Samuraiz	Kanazawa Ishikawa	Kanazawa City General Gymnasium	2,312	2015	2016
Central	Niigata Albirex BB	Nagaoka, Niigata	City Hall Plaza Aore Nagaoka	5,000	1954	2016
Central	Yokohama Excellence	Yokohama, Kanagawa	Yokohama Budokan	3,000	2002	2016
West	Bambitious Nara	Nara, Nara	Rohto Arena Nara		2013	2016
West	Fighting Eagles Nagoya	Nagoya, Aichi	Biwajima Sports Center		1957	2016
West	Tokushima Gambarous	Tokushima, Tokushima	Tokushima City Gymnasium	4,200	2022	2023
West	Tryhoop Okayama	Okayama, Okayama	Shigeto Arena Okayama	11,000	2018	2019
West	Veltex Shizuoka	Shizuoka, Shizuoka	Shizuoka City Central Gymnasium	984	2018	2019
South	Ehime Orange Vikings	Matsuyama, Ehime	Matsuyama City General Community Center		2005	2016
South	Kagawa Five Arrows	Takamatsu, Kagawa	Takamatsu City General Gymnasium		2006	2016
South	Kagoshima Rebnise	Kagoshima, Kagoshima	Kagoshima Arena	5,000	2008	2016
South	Kumamoto Volters	Kumamoto, Kumamoto	Kumamoto Prefectural Gymnasium	4,110	2012	2016
South	Rizing Zephyr Fukuoka	Fukuoka, Fukuoka	Teriha Sekisui House Arena	5,042	2006	2016

=== B.League Next (4 teams) ===
Locations of the B.League Next teams

Team	Location	Arena	Capacity	Founded	Joined
Shinagawa City BC	Shinagawa, Tokyo	Shinagawa City Togoshi Gymnasium	424	2012	2021
Veertien Mie Basketball	Yokkaichi, Mie	Yokkaichi General Gymnasium	3,000	2020	2022
Wolga Shonan	Fujisawa, Kanagawa	Fujisawa City Akibadai Cultural Gymnasium	3,000	2020	2022
Yamaguchi Patsfive	Yamaguchi, Yamaguchi	Ube Tawarada Memorial Gymnasium	3,000	2020	2021

== Champions and finals ==
Numbers in brackets denote the team's seed in its conference from the regular season.

=== First division finals ===
Season	Champions	Runners-up	Finals score
2016–17	Link Tochigi Brex (2)	Kawasaki Brave Thunders (1)	85–79
2017–18	Alvark Tokyo (3)	Chiba Jets (2)	85–60
2018–19	Alvark Tokyo (4)	Chiba Jets (1)	71–67
2019–20	Cancelled due to the COVID-19 pandemic		
2020–21	Chiba Jets (2)	Utsunomiya Brex (1)	2–1 (best-of-three series)
2021–22	Utsunomiya Brex (2)	Ryukyu Golden Kings (1)	2–0 (best-of-three series)
2022–23	Ryukyu Golden Kings	Chiba Jets	2–0 (best-of-three series)
2023–24	Hiroshima Dragonflies	Ryukyu Golden Kings	2–1 (best-of-three series)
2024–25	Utsunomiya Brex	Ryukyu Golden Kings	2–1 (best-of-three series)
2025–26	Nagasaki Velca	Ryukyu Golden Kings	2–1 (best-of-three series)

=== Second division finals ===
Season	Champions	Runners-up	Finals score
2016–17	Nishinomiya Storks (2)	Shimane Susanoo Magic	85–79
2017–18	Rizing Zephyr Fukuoka (2)	Akita Northern Happinets	2–1 (best-of-three series)
2018–19	Shinshu Brave Warriors (1)	Gunma Crane Thunders (3)	2–0 (best-of-three series)
2019–20	Cancelled due to the COVID-19 pandemic		
2020–21	Gunma Crane Thunders (1)	Ibaraki Robots (2)	2–1 (best-of-three series)
2021–22	Fighting Eagles Nagoya (1)	Sendai 89ers (2)	2–1 (best-of-three series)
2022–23	Saga Ballooners	Nagasaki Velca	2–0 (best-of-three series)
2023–24	Shiga Lakes	Koshigaya Alphas	2–0 (best-of-three series)
2024–25	Altiri Chiba and Toyama Grouses	Nil	1–1 (best-of-two series)
2025–26	Kobe Storks	Fukushima Firebonds	2–0 (best-of-three series)

=== Third division finals ===
Season	Champions	Runners-up
2016–17	Rizing Zephyr Fukuoka	Kanazawa Samuraiz
2017–18	Tokyo Hachioji Trains	Tokyo Excellence
2018–19	Tokyo Excellence	Koshigaya Alphas
2019–20	Saga Ballooners	Aisin AW Areions Anjo
2020–21	Aisin AW Areions Anjo	Tryhoop Okayama
2021–22	Nagasaki Velca	Altiri Chiba
2022–23	Iwate Big Bulls	Veltex Shizuoka
2023–24	Fukui Blowinds	Kagoshima Rebnise
2024–25	Yokohama Excellence	Earthfriends Tokyo Z
2025–26	Tachikawa Dice	Kagawa Five Arrows

== Rules ==
=== Foreign players ===
Each club in the first and second divisions will be allowed up to three registered foreign players, excluding one foreign-born player who has become a naturalized Japanese citizen.

In line with Japan Basketball Association regulations, foreign citizens who were either born or raised in Japan and graduated from Japanese elementary and junior high school will not be treated as a foreign player for the purpose of these rules.

== Partnerships ==
In January 2024, the Australian National Basketball League announced a partnership with the B.League which will see future collaboration on pre-season game crossovers and potential exploration of the viability of a team from Japan participating in the Australian NBL.
