= Shimane Susanoo Magic =

Japanese professional basketball team

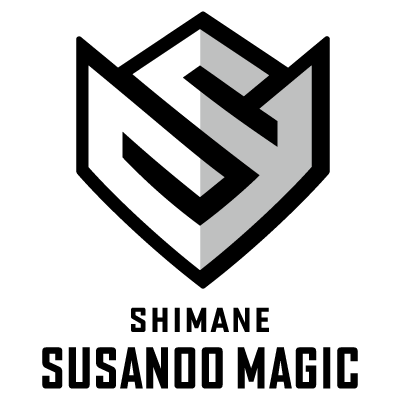
- League: B.League
- Founded: 2009; 17 years ago
- History: 2010–present
- Arena: Matsue City General Gymnasium, Tottori Prefectural Gymnasium, Kami Arena, Shimane Prefectural Gymnasium, Yasugi Citizens Gymnasium
- Location: Matsue City (Shimane Prefecture)
- Team colors: Blue, Black and Silver
- Main sponsor: San-in Godo Bank
- Head coach: Petar Božić
- Ownership: Bandai Namco Entertainment
- Championships: 0
- Website: http://www.susanoo-m.com/
Home	Away

The Shimane Susanoo Magic (島根スサノオマジック, Shimane Susanoo Majikku) are a Japanese professional basketball team based in Shimane Prefecture. The team competes in the B.League Premier, the highest division of the B.League, as a member of the Western Conference. The team is headquartered in Matsue and plays its home games out of Kami Arena in Izumo.

== Introduction ==
The club became a member of the bj league in 2010, becoming the first professional basketball team in the Sanin region to compete in top-tier competition, and second of any professional sports team after Gainare Tottori.

The team's name comes from the mythical legend of early Izumo (the story of Susanoo slaying the Yamata no Orochi), and the English word magic, representing the imagery of the myths of the region as well as the team itself. The team colours are blue, black and silver which also represent the Shimane prefecture. The blue evokes images of Lake Shinji and the Sea of Japan, silver represents the historic Iwami Ginzan Silver Mine and black represents the black pine forests found throughout the region. The team logo is a combination of clouds and an Orochi-like dragon holding a basketball, expressing a sense of strength and speed.

== History ==
Magic logo used until 2026.

Basketball has long been a popular sport among young people in the Matsue area with the organisation of Mini Basketball (a basketball competition played by elementary school children) becoming popular in Matsue. Historically, Matsue area has had success in athletic meets, Matsue Technical High School winning at interscholastic athletic meets in 1960 and 1968. Both Japan men's and women's basketball have had strong performing players from Matsue region, the region being known as the "Kingdom of Basketball" After an unsuccessful attempt for application to join the bj league in 2007, in August 2009 it was officially announced that Shimane would have a team in the bj league becoming in the 2010/11 season. In November 2009, the decision was made by the public for the team name to be Shimane Susanoo Magic. University students born in Matsue were invited to decide upon the team's proposed logo and proposed designs for the team mascot were received from all over the country. The winning proposal was "Susatama-kun"

== Roster ==
Shimane Susanoo Magic roster
Players
Coaches

Pos.	No.	Nat.	Name	Ht.	Age
PG	1	(Japan)	Shohei Goto	1.80 m (5 ft 11 in)	34 – 5 August 1992
G/F	2	(United States)	Perrin Buford	1.98 m (6 ft 6 in)	32 – 25 January 1994
PG	3	(Japan)	Seiya Ando (C)	1.84 m (6 ft 0 in)	34 – 15 July 1992
PF	4	(Australia)	Nick Kay	2.06 m (6 ft 9 in)	34 – 3 August 1992
PG	6	(Japan)	Hiromu Kitagawa	1.82 m (6 ft 0 in)	35 – 16 October 1991
F	8	(United States)	Reid Travis	2.03 m (6 ft 8 in)	30 – 25 November 1995
SG	13	(Japan)	Ryo Abe	1.83 m (6 ft 0 in)	31 – 4 May 1995
F/C	14	(United States)	James Michael McAdoo	2.06 m (6 ft 9 in)	33 – 4 January 1993
G/F	15	(Japan)	Ryosuke Shirahama	1.90 m (6 ft 3 in)	35 – 29 August 1991
G	26	(Japan)	Shota Tsuyama	1.78 m (5 ft 10 in)	30 – 16 April 1996
F/C	35	(United States)	Jordan Heath	2.08 m (6 ft 10 in)	35 – 20 August 1991
F	55	(Japan)	Daichi Taniguchi	2.01 m (6 ft 7 in)	36 – 15 April 1990

Head coach

- (New Zealand) Paul Henare

Assistant coach(es)

- (Japan) Ryuji Kawai

Legend

- (C) Team captain
- Injured

- Roster
Updated: 30 June 2026

== Notable players ==
- Robert Carter
- T. J. Cummings
- Jeral Davis
- Brandon Freeman
- Reginald Golson
- Takumi Ishizaki
- Brendan Lane
- Jameel McKay
- Bingo Merriex
- Alex Murphy
- Gyno Pomare
- Ryan Reid
- Hirotaka Sato
- Josh Scott
- Tyler Stone
- Garrett Stutz
- Keisuke Takabatake
- Al Thornton
- Ekpe Udoh
- Wesley Witherspoon
- Edward Yamamoto

== Coaches ==
- Željko Pavličević (2010–13)
- Vlaikidis Vlasios (2013–14)
- Reggie Hanson (2014)
- Tomohiro Moriyama
- Michael Katsuhisa (2015–17)
- Yukinori Suzuki
- Paul Henare
- Petar Bozic

== Arenas ==
- Matsue City General Gymnasium
- Kashima General Gymnasium
- Kami Arena
- Yonago Industrial Gymnasium

== Seasons ==
=== B.League ===
Key
Finish	Final position in league or division standings
MVP	Most Valuable Player

League champions	Division champions	Playoff berth

Season	League	Division	Regular season					Playoffs	Awards
Season	League	Division	Finish (Note: The Finish column lists regular season results and excludes postseason play.)	W (Note: The Wins and Losses columns list regular season results and exclude any postseason play. Regular and postseason records are combined only below the table.)	L	Pct	GB	Playoffs	Awards
Shimane Susanoo Magic
2016–17	B2	West	1st	51	9	.850	—	Won B2 semifinals (Dragonflies) 2–1; Lost B2 finals (Storks)	—
2017–18	B1	West	6th	11	49	.183	31		—
2018–19	B2	West	2nd	43	17	.717	5	Lost B2 semifinals (Brave Warriors) 0–2; Won B2 3rd placement game (Volters) 2–0	—
2019–20	B1	West	6th	11	30	.268	16	—	—
2020–21	B1	West	5th	28	32	.467	14	—	—
2021–22	B1	West	2nd	40	15	.727	8.5	Won quarterfinals (Alvark) 2–1; Lost semifinals (Golden Kings) 0–2	—
2022–23	B1	West	2nd	48	12	.800	—	Lost quarterfinals (Alvark) 1–2	—
2023–24	B1	West	4th	32	28	.533	9	—	—
2024–25	B1	West	2nd	37	23	.617	9	Lost quarterfinals (Golden Kings) 0–2	—
2025–26	B1	West	8th	28	32	.617	19	—	—
2026–27	Premier	West				–			

=== bj league ===
Year	Regular season								Final Result	Head coach	Comments
Year	Wins	Losses	Winning percentage	Game differential	Scored	Conceded	Goal difference	Ranking	Final Result	Head coach	Comments
2010-11	24	26	.480	10.0	77.3	77.3	0.0	West #6	Playoffs; Eliminated 1st round	(Croatia) Željko Pavličević	
