= Daichi Taniguchi =

Japanese basketball player (born 1990)

Daichi Taniguchi 谷口大智
No. 55 – Shimane Susanoo Magic
- Position: Center / forward
- League: B.League

Personal information
- Born: April 15, 1990 (age 36) Tawaramoto, Nara, Japan
- Listed height: 6 ft 7.5 in (2.02 m)
- Listed weight: 231 lb (105 kg)

Career information
- High school: Rakunan (Kyoto, Japan); South Kent School (South Kent, Connecticut)
- College: Arizona Western College (2010–2012); Southeastern Oklahoma State (2013–2015)
- NBA draft: 2015: undrafted
- Playing career: 2015–present

Career history
- 2015–2019: Akita Northern Happinets
- 2019-2021: Hiroshima Dragonflies
- 2021-2022: Ibaraki Robots
- 2022-present: Shimane Susanoo Magic

Career highlights
- 3× Japanese High School Champions; Arizona Community College Athletic Conference Champion (2012)

Daichi Taniguchi (born April 15, 1990) is a Japanese professional basketball player for Shimane Susanoo Magic of the B.League in Japan. He stood six feet, three inches tall as a 12-year-old boy. In 2009 Taniguchi won the "Slam Dunk Scholarship" funded by Takehiko Inoue, and played for the American colleges. He rejected the offers from the Kansai-area clubs and signed with the Akita Happinets in 2015. Due to the B.League's foreign player regulations, he receives significantly more playing time in 2016–17. He has been named the new Akita captain after Toshino's departure in November 2018. He is a Starbucks mug cup collector and a tropical fish addict. Use of the moyai emoji is usually meant to imply strength or determination, and it's also used frequently in Taniguchi's posts. He signed with Hiroshima Dragonflies on June 24, 2019.

== College statistics ==
Year	Team	GP	GS	MPG	FG%	3P%	FT%	RPG	APG	SPG	BPG	PPG
2010–11	Arizona Western	32			.450	.380	.810	2.063	0.313	0.375	0.344	6.4
2011–12	Arizona Western	29			.350	.200	.570	1.828	0.448	0.103	0.310	3.8
2013–14	SE OK State	27	16	24.3	.372	.351	.667	2.67	1.74	0.52	0.37	5.52
2014–15	SE OK State	9	2	6.4	.100	.111	.000	0.22	0.33	0	0	0.33

== Career statistics ==
Legend
GP	Games played	GS	Games started	MPG	Minutes per game
FG%	Field goal percentage	3P%	3-point field goal percentage	FT%	Free throw percentage
RPG	Rebounds per game	APG	Assists per game	SPG	Steals per game
BPG	Blocks per game	PPG	Points per game	**Bold**	Career high

=== Regular season ===
Year	Team	GP	GS	MPG	FG%	3P%	FT%	RPG	APG	SPG	BPG	PPG
bj League 2015–16	Akita	24		6.4	**43.4**	0	50	1.2	0.2	0.1	0.2	2.1
B League 2016-17	Akita	58	**37**	**18.1**	36.1	31.6	25	2.4	0.7	0.5	**0.5**	5.4
B League 2017-18	Akita	**60**	35	15.3	36.5	31.8	64	**2.9**	**1.2**	**1**	0.2	**5.8**
B League 2018-19	Akita	58		8.4	35.0	34.2	50.0	1.1	0.7	0.3	0.1	3.4
B League 2019-20	Hiroshima	45		9.0	43.1	**39.0**	**72.2**	1.9	0.6	0.3	0.2	3.4
B League 2020-21	Hiroshima	31		7.1	.367	.375	.923	0.8	0.3	0.3	0.1	2.2

=== Playoffs ===
Year	Team	GP	GS	MPG	FG%	3P%	FT%	RPG	APG	SPG	BPG	PPG
2016-17	Akita	2		20.00	.118	.133	.500	3.5	0.5	0.0	0.5	3.5
2017-18	Akita	5	4	9.39	.435	.421	1.000	1.4	0.6	0.4	0	6.0

=== Early cup games ===
Year	Team	GP	GS	MPG	FG%	3P%	FT%	RPG	APG	SPG	BPG	PPG
2017	Akita	2	2	18:04	.500	.571	.000	2.5	3.0	0.0	0.0	9.0
2018	Akita	2	1	7:55	.143	.143	.500	0.5	1.5	0.0	0.0	2.0
2019	Hiroshima	3	0	14:03	.231	.000	.500	1.7	1.3	1.3	0.3	3.0

=== Preseason games ===
Year	Team	GP	GS	MPG	FG%	3P%	FT%	RPG	APG	SPG	BPG	PPG
2018	Akita	2	1	8.5	.333	.200	.000	1.5	1.0	0.0	0.0	2.5

Source: Changwon1Changwon2

== Personal ==
He is the son of Kimiya and Sachiko Taniguchi. His brother Hiroki plays for the Shiga Lakestars of the B.League.
