= Kajiyama =

Kajiyama (written: 梶山) is a Japanese surname. Notable people with the surname include:

- Hiroshi Kajiyama (disambiguation), multiple people
- Hiroshi Kajiyama (gymnast) (梶山 広司, born 1953), Japanese gymnast
- Hiroshi Kajiyama (politician) (梶山 弘志, born 1955), Japanese politician
- Seiroku Kajiyama (梶山 静六, 1926–2000), Japanese politician
- Shingo Kajiyama (梶山 信吾), Japanese basketball coach
- Susumu Kajiyama (梶山 進), Japanese yakuza member
- Toshiyuki Kajiyama (梶山 季之, 1930–1975), Japanese writer
- Yōhei Kajiyama (梶山 陽平, born 1985), Japanese footballer
- Yoichi Kajiyama (梶山 洋一, born 1971), Japanese footballer
