= Shogo Asayama =

Japanese basketball player and coach

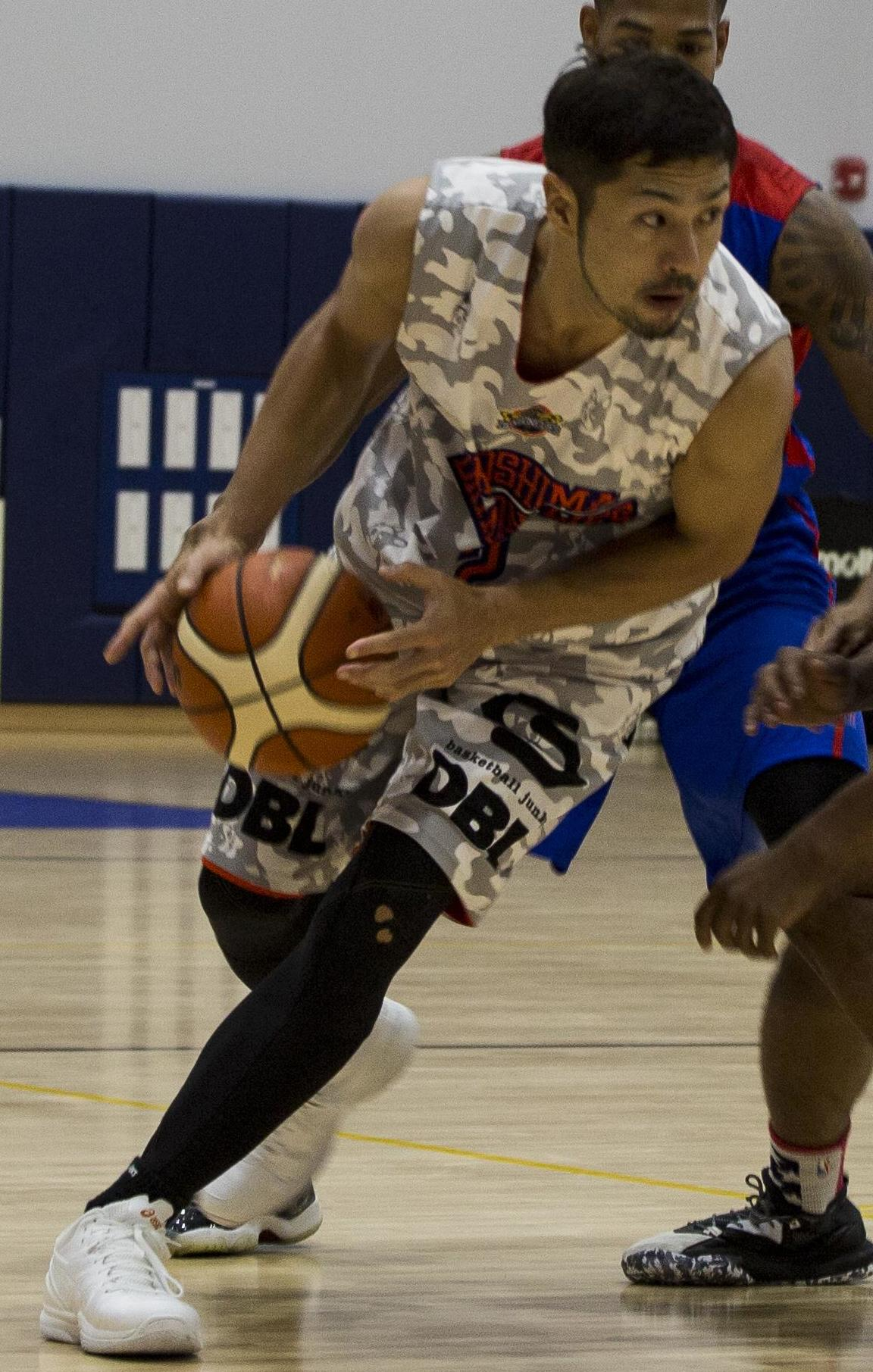

No. 2 – Hiroshima Dragonflies
- Position: Head Coach
- League: B.League

Personal information
- Born: June 1, 1981 (age 45) Yokohama, Kanagawa
- Listed height: 6 ft 4 in (1.93 m)
- Listed weight: 195 lb (88 kg)

Career information
- High school: Setagaya Gakuen (Setagaya, Tokyo)
- College: Waseda University
- Playing career: 2004–present
- Coaching career: 2017–present

Career history

Playing
- 2004-2005: Hitachi SunRockers
- 2005-2008: OSG Phoenix
- 2008-2009: Rera Kamuy Hokkaido
- 2009-2013: Aisin SeaHorses Mikawa
- 2013-2015: Mitsubishi Electric
- 2015-: Hiroshima Dragonflies

Coaching
- 2017-2018: Hiroshima Dragonflies
- 2018-2023: Hiroshima Dragonflies (assistant)
- 2024–Present: Hiroshima Dragonflies (Head Coach)

Career highlights
- B1 League champion (2024)

Shogo Asayama (朝山 正悟, Asayama Shōgo) is a Japanese who became the head coach and was a professional basketball player of the Hiroshima Dragonflies in the Japanese B.League.

== Head coaching record ==
Legend
Regular season	G	Games coached	W	Games won	L	Games lost	W–L %	Win–loss %
Playoffs	PG	Playoff games	PW	Playoff wins	PL	Playoff losses	PW–L %	Playoff win–loss %

Team	Year	G	W	L	W–L%	Finish	PG	PW	PL	PW–L%	Result
Hiroshima Dragonflies	2017-18	43	25	18	.581	3rd in B2 Western	-	-	-	–	-
