= Eric Jacobsen =

Eric Jacobsen may refer to:

- Eric Jacobsen (basketball), American basketball player
- Eric Jacobsen (chemist), American chemist
- Eric Jacobsen (conductor), American conductor and cellist
- Eric Jacobson, American puppeteer

== See also ==
- Erik Jacobsen, American record producer
