= Koh Flippin =

Japanese basketball player

Koh Flippin コー・フリッピン
- Flippin with Gunma in 2025.

No. 1 – Gunma Crane Thunders
- Position: Point guard / Shooting guard
- League: B.League

Personal information
- Born: May 20, 1996 (age 30) Torrance, California, U.S.
- Listed height: 188 cm (6 ft 2 in)
- Listed weight: 75 kg (165 lb)

Career information
- High school: North Torrance
- College: California, Riverside; Doane

Career history
- 2019–2021: Chiba Jets
- 2021–2023: Ryukyu Golden Kings
- 2023–: Gunma Crane Thunders

Career highlights
- 2x B1 League champion (2021, 2024)

John Alexander Koh Flippin, also known simply as Koh Flippin (コー・フリッピン, Kō Furippin), is a Japanese professional basketball player who plays for the Gunma Crane Thunders of the B.League.

== Early life and education ==
John Alexander Koh Flippin was born in Torrance, California in the United States on May 20, 1996. His father is American while his mother is Japanese. While he was raised in the US, Flippin often visited Okinawa Prefecture, Japan, during his childhood. His mother hails from the prefectural capital Naha. He played basketball as a boy.

Koh Flippin attended the North High School in Torrance before attending the University of California, Riverside. (n his final year, he transferred to the Doane University in Nebraska.

== Career ==
=== College ===
Koh Flippin played for the UC Riverside Highlanders in the NCAA Division I. For his senior season, Flippin played for the Doane Tigers of the National Association of Intercollegiate Athletics Division II.

=== Professional ===
==== Chiba Jets ====
Flippin started his professional career in Japan with the Chiba Jets of the B.League. He was signed in by the Jets in June 2019. The point guard and shooting guard, have dreamt of returning to Japan to play professionally near his family. He helped the Jets win the league title in the 2020–21 season.

==== Ryukyu Golden Kings ====
On June 12, 2021, the Ryukyu Golden Kings has announced that they have acquired Flippin from the Chiba Jets ahead of the 2021–22 B.League season. The Kings are based in Flippin's home prefecture of Okinawa.

Flippin helped the Golden Kings win their first B.League title since 2016. Against the Chiba Jets in the best-of-three Finals, Ryukyu won Game 1 before Flippin led Game 2 with 21 points and eight assists to complete the sweep. He was named Game 2 MVP and received the Japan Life Finals Award.

He later played for the Golden Kings at the EASL Champions Week in March 2023. The team lost in the third place game against the Hong Kong-based Bay Area Dragons

==== Gunma Crane Thunders ====
The Gunma Crane Thunders signed in Flippin ahead of the 2023–24 B1 League season. He was named Steals Leader for that season.

The 2025–26 season marked Flippin's first injury-related absence. After playing the first five games, he injured his right ankle. He returned in December and played two games before suffering a left ankle lateral collateral ligament injury. He returned in late January 2026 and has been recovering since.

=== National team ===
Koh Flippin has played for the Japan national basketball team. He has played for the B Team or developmental team which took part at the 2019 William Jones Cup in Taiwan.

Flippin debuted for the senior team under head coach Tom Hovasse at the 2022 Softbank Cup against Iran. His first appearance in a FIBA-sanctioned event was the November 2022 window of the 2023 FIBA Basketball World Cup qualifiers.

== Personal life ==
Flippin who holds Japanese citizenship is a second-generation Okinawan. He is of African-American and Japanese descent. He also has relatives in the Kanto Region His connections to the United States include Los Angeles and Torrance, California.
