= Harimoto =

Harimoto (written: 張本) is a Japanese surname. Notable people with the surname include:

- Isao Harimoto (張本 勲; born 1940), Japanese baseball player of Korean descent
- Tenketsu Harimoto (張本 天傑; born 1992), Chinese-born Japanese basketball player
- Tomokazu Harimoto (張本 智和; born 2003), Japanese table tennis player of Chinese descent
- Miwa Harimoto (張本 美和, born 2008), Japanese table tennis player of Chinese descent
