= 2020–21 B.League season =

- League: B.League
- Season: 2020–21
- Duration: October 2, 2020 – June 1, 2021
- TV partner(s): Basket LIVE, Amazon Prime Video, DAZN, NHK, SKY PerfecTV!, others

B1 Regular season
- Season MVP: Kosuke Kanamaru
- Promoted: (B1) Gunma Crane Thunders, Ibaraki Robots (B2) None
- Relegated: (B2) None (B3) None

B1 Finals
- Champions: Chiba Jets
- Runners-up: Utsunomiya Brex
- Finals MVP: Sebas Saiz

Statistical leaders
- Points: Nick Mayo
- Rebounds: Jack Cooley
- Assists: Julian Mavunga

The 2020–21 B.League season was the fifth season of the Japanese B.League.

== B1 ==
=== Regular season ===
East District

#	B1	W	L	PCT	GB	GP
1	Utsunomiya Brex	49	11	.817	—	60
2	Chiba Jets	43	14	.754	4.5	57
3	Kawasaki Brave Thunders	43	16	.729	5.5	59
4	Toyama Grouses	39	21	.650	10	60
5	Sun Rockers Shibuya	38	22	.633	11	60
6	Alvark Tokyo	32	24	.571	15	56
7	Akita Northern Happinets	28	31	.475	20.5	59
8	Yokohama B-Corsairs	19	40	.322	29.5	59
9	Niigata Albirex BB	16	38	.296	30	54
10	Levanga Hokkaido	14	45	.237	34.5	59

West District

#	B1	W	L	PCT	GB	GP
1	Ryukyu Golden Kings	40	16	.714	—	56
2	Osaka Evessa	34	20	.630	5	54
3	Seahorses Mikawa	34	21	.618	5.5	55
4	Nagoya Diamond Dolphins	32	24	.571	8	56
5	Shimane Susanoo Magic	28	32	.467	14	60
6	Shiga Lakestars	23	36	.390	18.5	59
7	Shinshu Brave Warriors	20	34	.370	19	54
8	Kyoto Hannaryz	21	36	.368	19.5	57
9	San-en NeoPhoenix	12	47	.203	29.5	59
10	Hiroshima Dragonflies	9	46	.164	30.5	55

== B1 Individual statistic leaders ==
Category	Player	Team	Statistic
Points per game	Nick Mayo	Levanga Hokkaido	21.5
Rebounds per game	Jack Cooley	Ryukyu Golden Kings	12.3
Assists per game	Julian Mavunga	Toyama Grouses	7.4
Steals per game	Hayato Kawashima	San-en NeoPhoenix	2.4
Blocks per game	Alex Davis	Akita Northern Happinets	2.2
FT%	Kosuke Kanamaru	Akita Northern Happinets	91.0%
3FG%	Yusuke Karino	Nagoya Diamond Dolphins	47.5%

== B2 ==
2020–21 B.League season

B2 Regular season
- Season MVP: Trey McKinney-Jones

B2 Finals
- Champions: Gunma Crane Thunders
- Runners-up: Ibaraki Robots
- Finals MVP: Trey McKinney-Jones

Statistical leaders
- Points: Scootie Randall
- Rebounds: Isaac Butts
- Assists: Kaito Ishikawa

=== Regular season ===
East District

#	B2	W	L	PCT	GB	GP
1	Gunma Crane Thunders	52	5	.912	-	57
2	Ibaraki Robots	41	16	.719	11	57
3	Koshigaya Alphas	35	22	.614	17	57
4	Sendai 89ers	35	24	.593	18	59
5	Yamagata Wyverns	31	29	.517	22.5	60
6	Fukushima Firebonds	27	31	.466	25.5	58
7	Earthfriends Tokyo Z	13	46	.220	40	59
8	Aomori Wat's	7	51	.121	45.5	58

West District

#	B2	W	L	PCT	GB	GP
1	Nishinomiya Storks	40	18	.690	-	58
2	Fighting Eagles Nagoya	36	22	.621	X	58
3	Saga Ballooners	30	26	.536	9	56
4	Kagawa Five Arrows	27	30	.474	12.5	57
5	Rizing Zephyr Fukuoka	26	33	.441	14.5	59
6	Kumamoto Volters	26	34	.433	15	60
7	Bambitious Nara	20	38	.345	20	58
8	Ehime Orange Vikings	17	38	.309	21.5	55

== B2 Individual statistic leaders ==
Category	Player	Team	Statistic
Points per game	Scootie Randall	Yamagata Wyverns	23.7
Rebounds per game	Isaac Butts	Koshigaya Alphas	13.1
Assists per game	Kaito Ishikawa	Kumamoto Volters	8.9
Steals per game	Reynaldo Garcia	Saga Ballooners	2.7
Blocks per game	Daniel Miller	Sendai 89ers	1.4
FT%	Ryusei Sasaki	Kumamoto Volters	92.2%
3FG%	Takuya Soma	Saga Ballooners	45.2%
