= Shirahama =

Shirahama (written: 白濱 or 白浜) may refer to:

== Places ==
- Shirahama, Chiba, a town in Chiba Prefecture, Japan
- Shirahama, Wakayama, a town in Wakayama Prefecture, Japan
- Shirahama Station, a railway station in Shirahama, Wakayama Prefecture, Japan

== People with the surname ==
- Alan Shirahama (白濱 亜嵐; born 1993), Japanese performer, actor, and DJ
- Kamome Shirahama (白浜 鴎), Japanese manga artist
- Ikuo Shirahama (born 1958), Japanese professional golfer
- Izumi Shirahama (白濱 イズミ; born 1989), Japanese fashion model and television personality known professionally as Loveli
- Kazuyoshi Shirahama (白浜 一良; born 1947), Japanese politician
- Shirahama Kenki (白濱 顕貴), Japanese pirate of the late 16th and early 17th centuries
- Ryosuke Shirahama (白濱 僚祐; born 1991), Japanese professional basketball player
