= Reggie Hanson =

American basketball player-coach

Personal information
- Born: October 6, 1968 (age 58) Charlotte, North Carolina
- Listed height: 6 ft 8 in (2.03 m)
- Listed weight: 195 lb (88 kg)

Career information
- High school: Pulaski County (Somerset, Kentucky)
- College: Kentucky (1987–1991)
- NBA draft: 1991: undrafted
- Playing career: 1991–2000
- Position: Small forward
- Number: 34
- Coaching career: 2000–present

Career history

Playing
- 1991–1992: Louisville Shooters
- 1993: Isuzu Motors
- 1994–1998: Denso Co.
- 1998: Boston Celtics
- 1998–2000: Aichi Machine

Coaching
- 2000–2007: Kentucky (assistant)
- 2007–2011: South Florida (assistant)
- 2014: Shimane Susanoo Magic

Career highlights
- 2× Second-team All-SEC (1990, 1991)
- Stats at NBA.com
- Stats at Basketball Reference

Reggie Hanson (born October 6, 1968) is an American former professional basketball player who played for the Boston Celtics of the National Basketball Association (NBA). He is a former assistant coach for the University of South Florida Bulls men's basketball team and former head coach in Japan's Shimane Susanoo Magic. With the Celtics, Hanson appeared in 8 games, scoring 6 points in 26 minutes while on two ten-day contracts with the Celtics. He would be the last Celtic to wear #34 before Paul Pierce. He also played professionally in Japan. He played collegiately with the Kentucky Wildcats men's basketball team. Hanson was born in Charlotte, North Carolina and graduated from high school in Pulaski County, Kentucky.

== Head coaching record ==
Legend
Regular season	G	Games coached	W	Games won	L	Games lost	W–L %	Win–loss %
Playoffs	PG	Playoff games	PW	Playoff wins	PL	Playoff losses	PW–L %	Playoff win–loss %

Team	Year	G	W	L	W–L%	Finish	PG	PW	PL	PW–L%	Result
Shimane Susanoo Magic	2014	26	6	20	.231	10th in Western	-	-	-	–	-
Shimane Susanoo Magic	2014	12	1	11	.083	Fired	-	-	-	–	-
