= 2023–24 B1 League season =

Events in Japanese basketball

- League: B.League
- Season: 2023–24
- Duration: 5 October 2023 – 28 May 2024
- TV partner(s): Basket LIVE, Amazon Prime Video, Hulu, NHK, SKY PerfecTV!, others

B1 Regular season
- Relegated: Shinshu Brave Warriors; Toyama Grouses

B1 Finals
- Champions: Hiroshima Dragonflies
- Runners-up: Ryukyu Golden Kings

Statistical leaders
Points	Perrin Buford (Shimane)	22.6
Rebounds	Thomas Welsh (Hokkaido)	12.2
Assists	Yuki Kawamura (Yokohama)	8.1

The 2023–24 B1 League season was the eighth season of the B1 League, the top Japanese professional basketball league, since its establishment in 2015. The regular season began on 5 October 2023.

The Ryukyu Golden Kings are the defending champions, having won their first B1 League title after defeating the Chiba Jets in the 2023 Finals.

== Teams ==
=== Team changes ===
Promoted from 2022–23 B2 League	Relegated from 2022–23 B1 League
Saga Ballooners; Nagasaki Velca	Niigata Albirex BB; Shiga Lakes

=== Coaching changes ===
Team	Outgoing	Incoming
Off-season
Ibaraki Robots	Richard Glesmann	James Andrisevic
SeaHorses Mikawa	Kimikazu Suzuki	Ryan Richman
Sunrockers Shibuya	Ken Hamanaka	Luka Pavićević
In season
Ibaraki Robots	James Andrisevic	Richard Glesmann
Toyama Grouses	Daisuke Takaoka	J. R. Sakuragi

== Regular season ==
=== Standings ===
Central

Pos	Team	Pld	W	L	GF	GA	GD	Qualification or relegation
1	San-en NeoPhoenix (Q)	60	46	14	5371	4749	+622	Qualification to playoffs
2	SeaHorses Mikawa (Q)	60	36	24	4821	4545	+276	Qualification to playoffs
3	Sun Rockers Shibuya	60	35	25	4520	4443	+77	
4	Kawasaki Brave Thunders	60	33	27	4825	4703	+122	
5	Fighting Eagles Nagoya	60	33	27	4553	4496	+57	
6	Yokohama B-Corsairs	60	24	36	4629	4945	−316	
7	Shinshu Brave Warriors (R)	60	10	50	4332	4955	−623	Relegated to B2 League
8	Toyama Grouses (R)	60	4	56	4318	5150	−832	Relegated to B2 League

Source: B.League
(Q) Qualified for the phase indicated; (R) Relegated

Eastern

Pos	Team	Pld	W	L	GF	GA	GD	Qualification or relegation
1	Utsunomiya Brex (Q)	60	51	9	4896	4154	+742	Qualification to playoffs
2	Alvark Tokyo (Q)	60	48	12	4875	4197	+678	Qualification to playoffs
3	Chiba Jets (Q)	60	35	25	5054	4900	+154	Wildcard
4	Gunma Crane Thunders	60	31	29	4801	4913	−112	
5	Akita Northern Happinets	60	30	30	4450	4514	−64	
6	Sendai 89ers	60	27	33	4759	4846	−87	
7	Levanga Hokkaido	60	17	43	4519	4914	−395	
8	Ibaraki Robots	60	12	48	4580	5193	−613	

Source: B.League
(Q) Qualified for the phase indicated

Western

Pos	Team	Pld	W	L	GF	GA	GD	Qualification or relegation
1	Nagoya Diamond Dolphins (Q)	60	41	19	5041	4761	+280	Qualification to playoffs
2	Ryukyu Golden Kings (Q)	60	41	19	4956	4667	+289	Qualification to playoffs
3	Hiroshima Dragonflies (Q)	60	36	24	4751	4402	+349	Wildcard
4	Shimane Susanoo Magic	60	32	28	4899	4724	+175	
5	Saga Ballooners	60	29	31	4523	4504	+19	
6	Nagasaki Velca	60	27	33	4869	5012	−143	
7	Osaka Evessa	60	25	35	4748	4970	−222	
8	Kyoto Hannaryz	60	17	43	4640	5073	−433	

Source: B.League
(Q) Qualified for the phase indicated

== Playoffs ==
=== Bracket ===
All matches in the playoffs were in a best-of-three series. Teams in bold advanced to the next round.

Quarterfinals
1	Utsunomiya Brex	1
**8**	**Chiba Jets**	**2**
4	Alvark Tokyo	1
**5**	**Ryukyu Golden Kings**	**2**
**3**	**Nagoya Diamond Dolphins**	**2**
6	SeaHorses Mikawa	0
2	San-en NeoPhoenix	0
**7**	**Hiroshima Dragonflies**	**2**

Semifinals
8	Chiba Jets	1
**5**	**Ryukyu Golden Kings**	**2**
3	Nagoya Diamond Dolphins	1
**7**	**Hiroshima Dragonflies**	**2**

Finals
5	Ryukyu Golden Kings	1
**7**	**Hiroshima Dragonflies**	**2**

=== Quarterfinals ===
==== (1) Utsunomiya Brex vs. (8) Chiba Jets ====
10 May 2024
19:25

boxscore

Utsunomiya Brex	70–**82**	**Chiba Jets**
Scoring by quarter: 18–**26**, 21–**28**, **16**–13, 15–15
Pts: Newbill 15; Rebs: Edwards 9 Asts: Newbill 4		Pts: Togashi 24; Rebs: Mooney 9 Asts: Togashi 4
**Chiba leads series, 1–0**

Nikkan Arena Tochigi, Tochigi
Attendance: 5,774
Referees: Hijiri Abe, Kohei Kano, Toshihiro Aoki

11 May 2024
19:30

boxscore

**Utsunomiya Brex**	**67**–58	Chiba Jets
Scoring by quarter: 13–**19**, **23**–10, 18–**19**, **13**–10
Pts: Edwards 21; Rebs: Edwards 13; Asts: Newbill 8		Pts: Mooney, Togashi 16; Rebs: Mooney 12; Asts: Brown, Togashi 3
**Series tied, 1–1**

Nikkan Arena Tochigi, Tochigi
Attendance: 5,780
Referees: Hijiri Abe, Kohei Kano, Toshihiro Aoki

13 May 2024
19:25

boxscore

Utsunomiya Brex	93–**103** (2OT)	**Chiba Jets**
Scoring by quarter: 20–**25**, **15**–14, **22**–17, 17–**18**, Overtime: 9–9, 10–**20**
Pts: Newbill 30; Rebs: Jerrett 7 Asts: Hiejima 5		Pts: Smith 36; Rebs: Cooks, Smith 11; Asts: Togashi 12
**Chiba wins series, 2–1**

Nikkan Arena Tochigi, Tochigi
Attendance: 5,681
Referees: Hijiri Abe, Kohei Kano, Toshihiro Aoki

==== (2) San-en NeoPhoenix vs. (7) Hiroshima Dragonflies ====
11 May 2024
13:05

boxscore

San-en NeoPhoenix	70–**77**	**Hiroshima Dragonflies**
Scoring by quarter: **23**–21, **18**–17, **18**–16, 11–**23**
Pts: Maten 17; Rebs: Dudzinski 8 Asts: Oura 7		Pts: Evans 22; Rebs: Blackshear, Kawata 7 Asts: Evans, Mayo, Nakamura 3
**Hiroshima leads series, 1–0**

Toyohashi City Gymnasium, Aichi
Attendance: 3,006
Referees: Takaki Kato, Yuki Kubo, Tsutomu Ozawa

12 May 2024
13:05

boxscore

San-en NeoPhoenix	66–**69**	**Hiroshima Dragonflies**
Scoring by quarter: 21–**23**, 20–20, **14**–7, 11–**19**
Pts: Dudzinski 25; Rebs: Maten 14; Asts: Oura 7		Pts: Evans 18; Rebs: Evans 6 Asts: Evans 5
**Hiroshima wins series, 2–0**

Toyohashi City Gymnasium, Aichi
Attendance: 4,022
Referees: Takaki Kato, Yuki Kubo, Tsutomu Ozawa

==== (3) Nagoya Diamond Dolphins vs. (6) SeaHorses Mikawa ====
11 May 2024
15:05

boxscore

**Nagoya Diamond Dolphins**	**78**–69	SeaHorses Mikawa
Scoring by quarter: 16–**20**, **23**–19, **20**–15, **19**–15
Pts: Saito 21; Rebs: Soares 13; Asts: Saito 7		Pts: Auguste 16; Rebs: Auguste, Gardner 8 Asts: Gardner, Nagano 4
**Nagoya leads series, 1–0**

Dolphins Arena, Aichi
Attendance: 5,414
Referees: Shigeyuki Arisawa, Ryosuke Ito, Norito Okawara

12 May 2024
15:05

boxscore

**Nagoya Diamond Dolphins**	**84**–75	SeaHorses Mikawa
Scoring by quarter: 18–**19**, 23–**28**, 11–11, **32**–17
Pts: Saito 23; Rebs: Soares 11; Asts: Saito 8		Pts: Gardner, Layman 14; Rebs: Auguste 9 Asts: Nagano 6
**Nagoya wins series, 2–0**

Dolphins Arena, Aichi
Attendance: 5,744
Referees: Shigeyuki Arisawa, Ryosuke Ito, Norito Okawara

==== (4) Alvark Tokyo vs. (5) Ryukyu Golden Kings ====
10 May 2024
19:05

boxscore

Alvark Tokyo	80–**81** (2OT)	**Ryukyu Golden Kings**
Scoring by quarter: 18–18, **25**–11, 10–**20**, 14–**18**, Overtime: 6–6, 7–**8**
Pts: Rossiter 24; Rebs: Rossiter 18; Asts: Saiz, Toews 4		Pts: Durham 18; Rebs: Cooley 8 Asts: Imamura 6
**Ryukyu leads series, 1–0**

Ariake Coliseum, Tokyo
Attendance: 6,301
Referees: Daigo Urushima, Yuji Hirahara, Haruka Iwai

11 May 2024
19:05

boxscore

**Alvark Tokyo**	**73**–69	Ryukyu Golden Kings
Scoring by quarter: **19**–9, **27**–26, 13–**17**, 14–**17**
Pts: Rossiter 24; Rebs: Rossiter 13; Asts: Toews 5		Pts: Kishimoto 14; Rebs: Kirk 8 Asts: Imamura 3
**Series tied, 1–1**

Ariake Coliseum, Tokyo
Attendance: 9,011
Referees: Daigo Urushima, Yuji Hirahara, Haruka Iwai

13 May 2024
19:05

boxscore

Alvark Tokyo	57–**58**	**Ryukyu Golden Kings**
Scoring by quarter: 9–**12**, 20–20, 16–16, **12**–10
Pts: Rossiter 20; Rebs: Gudaitis 9 Asts: Toews 4		Pts: Durham 16; Rebs: Law 11; Asts: Durham, Imamura 3
**Ryukyu wins series, 2–1**

Ariake Coliseum, Tokyo
Attendance: 5,604
Referees: Daigo Urushima, Yuji Hirahara, Haruka Iwai

=== Semifinals ===
==== (3) Nagoya Diamond Dolphins vs. (7) Hiroshima Dragonflies ====
18 May 2024
14:05

boxscore

Nagoya Diamond Dolphins	75–**79**	**Hiroshima Dragonflies**
Scoring by quarter: **23**–13, **22**–18, 3–**24**, **27**–24
Pts: Eatherton 14; Rebs: Eatherton, Soares 9 Asts: Eatherton, Nakahigashi, Saito 5		Pts: Blackshear 21; Rebs: Enomoto, Mayo 6 Asts: Mayo 5
**Hiroshima leads series, 1–0**

Dolphins Arena, Aichi
Attendance: 5,272
Referees: Daigo Urushima, Kohei Kano, Taiyu Ohno

19 May 2024
13:10

boxscore

**Nagoya Diamond Dolphins**	**84**–77	Hiroshima Dragonflies
Scoring by quarter: **27**–17, **24**–20, 18–**20**, 15–**20**
Pts: Eatherton 18; Rebs: Eatherton 7 Asts: Saito 6		Pts: Evans 25; Rebs: Evans 9 Asts: Evans 6
**Series tied, 1–1**

Dolphins Arena, Aichi
Attendance: 5,446
Referees: Daigo Urushima, Kohei Kano, Taiyu Ohno

20 May 2024
19:05

boxscore

Nagoya Diamond Dolphins	73–**79**	**Hiroshima Dragonflies**
Scoring by quarter: 13–**23**, **22**–15, **25**–21, 13–**20**
Pts: Parks 20; Rebs: Eatherton 9 Asts: Nakahigashi 4		Pts: Evans 28; Rebs: Evans 7 Asts: Evans 6
**Hiroshima wins series, 2–1**

Dolphins Arena, Aichi
Attendance: 5,290
Referees: Daigo Urushima, Kohei Kano, Taiyu Ohno

==== (5) Ryukyu Golden Kings vs. (8) Chiba Jets ====
18 May 2024
16:05

boxscore

Ryukyu Golden Kings	62–**95**	**Chiba Jets**
Scoring by quarter: 24–**29**, 14–**30**, **12**–11, 12–**25**
Pts: Law 16; Rebs: Cooley 8 Asts: Law 4		Pts: Smith 19; Rebs: Brown 6 Asts: Togashi 7
**Chiba leads series, 1–0**

Okinawa Arena, Okinawa
Attendance: 8,582
Referees: Norito Okawara, Takeo Kitazawa, Shigeyuki Arisawa

19 May 2024
16:05

boxscore

**Ryukyu Golden Kings**	**81**–63	Chiba Jets
Scoring by quarter: **23**–13, 20–20, **19**–15, **19**–15
Pts: Cooley 25; Rebs: Durham 16; Asts: Durham 7		Pts: Smith 19; Rebs: Cooks 7 Asts: Cooks 6
**Series tied, 1–1**

Okinawa Arena, Okinawa
Attendance: 8,643
Referees: Norito Okawara, Takeo Kitazawa, Shigeyuki Arisawa

21 May 2024
19:05

boxscore

**Ryukyu Golden Kings**	**83**–67	Chiba Jets
Scoring by quarter: **22**–14, **24**–17, 19–**24**, **18**–12
Pts: Cooley, Durham 15; Rebs: Cooley 10; Asts: Durham 8		Pts: Togashi 18; Rebs: Mooney 11; Asts: Togashi 6
**Ryukyu wins series, 2–1**

Okinawa Arena, Okinawa
Attendance: 8,712
Referees: Norito Okawara, Takeo Kitazawa, Shigeyuki Arisawa

=== Finals ===
==== (5) Ryukyu Golden Kings vs. (7) Hiroshima Dragonflies ====
25 May 2024
12:00

boxscore

**Ryukyu Golden Kings**	**74**–62	Hiroshima Dragonflies
Scoring by quarter: **24**–16, **19**–9, **19**–18, 12–**19**
Pts: Imamura 15; Rebs: Cooley, Law 7 Asts: Durham 8		Pts: Blackshear 15; Rebs: Blackshear 8 Asts: Blackshear, Mayo 4
**Ryukyu leads series, 1–0**

Yokohama Arena, Kanagawa
Attendance: 12,969
Referees: Takaki Kato, Hijiri Abe, Takeshi Hiraide

26 May 2024
13:10

boxscore

Ryukyu Golden Kings	63–**72**	**Hiroshima Dragonflies**
Scoring by quarter: 14–**21**, **20**–9, 13–**18**, 16–**24**
Pts: Law 16; Rebs: Imamura 7 Asts: Durham 7		Pts: Evans 16; Rebs: Evans, Enomoto 6 Asts: Evans 5
**Series tied, 1–1**

Yokohama Arena, Kanagawa
Attendance: 13,203
Referees: Takaki Kato, Hijiri Abe, Takeshi Hiraide

28 May 2024
19:05

boxscore

Ryukyu Golden Kings	50–**65**	**Hiroshima Dragonflies**
Scoring by quarter: 12–**17**, 17–**18**, 11–11, 10–**19**
Pts: Law 16; Rebs: Cooley, Imamura 7 Asts: Durham 4		Pts: Evans 13; Rebs: Evans 9 Asts: Blackshear, Mayo 4
**Hiroshima wins series, 2–1**

Yokohama Arena, Kanagawa
Attendance: 12,209
Referees: Takaki Kato, Hijiri Abe, Takeshi Hiraide

== Statistics ==
=== Individual statistic leaders ===
Category	Player	Team	Statistic
Points per game	(United States) Perrin Buford	Shimane Susanoo Magic	22.6
Rebounds per game	(United States) Thomas Welsh	Levanga Hokkaido	12.2
Assists per game	(Japan) Yuki Kawamura	Yokohama B-Corsairs	7.9
Steals per game	(United States) Koh Flippin	Gunma Crane Thunders	1.9
Blocks per game	(United States) Jordan Heath	Kawasaki Brave Thunders	1.7
FG%	(United States) Scott Eatherton	Nagoya Diamond Dolphins	61.0%
3FG%	(United States) Scott Eatherton	Nagoya Diamond Dolphins	47.1%
FT%	(Japan) Atsunobu Hirao	Ibaraki Robots	91.1%

=== Team statistic leaders ===
Category	Team	Statistic
Points per game	San-en NeoPhoenix	89.5
Rebounds per game	Nagoya Diamond Dolphins	34.0
Assists per game	San-en NeoPhoenix	22.3
Steals per game	Nagasaki Velca	8.0
Blocks per game	Chiba Jets	3.6
FG%	SeaHorses Mikawa	46.5%
3FG%	Sun Rockers Shibuya	38.2%
FT%	Sun Rockers Shibuya	78.7%

== B1 League clubs in Asian competitions ==
Team	Competition	Progress
Chiba Jets	East Asia Super League	Championship game
Ryukyu Golden Kings	East Asia Super League	Group stage Group B

== Attendances ==
#	Club	Average attendance
1	Ryukyu Golden Kings	7,746
2	Alvark Tokyo	6,012
3	Gunma Crane Thunders	5,244
4	Nagoya Diamond Dolphins	5,190
5	Saga Ballooners	5,061
6	Yokohama B-Corsairs	4,799
7	Utsunomiya Brex	4,742
8	Osaka Evessa	4,716
9	Chiba Jets Funabashi	4,634
10	Ibaraki Robots	4,619
11	Hiroshima Dragonflies	4,618
12	Levanga Hokkaido	4,617
13	Kawasaki Brave Thunders	4,559
14	Sun Rockers Shibuya	4,456
15	Sendai 89ers	4,373
16	Kyoto Hannaryz	4,345
17	Akita Northern Happinets	4,342
18	Shinshu Brave Warriors	4,291
19	Shimane Susanoo Magic	4,230
20	Toyama Grouses	4,180
21	Nagasaki Velca	3,630
22	SeaHorses Mikawa	3,443
23	Fighting Eagles Nagoya	2,730
24	Rizing Zephyr Fukuoka	2,304
