= Tsukuba Capio =

Arena in Tsukuba, Ibaraki, Japan

Coordinates: 36°4′44.4″N 140°6′57.2″E

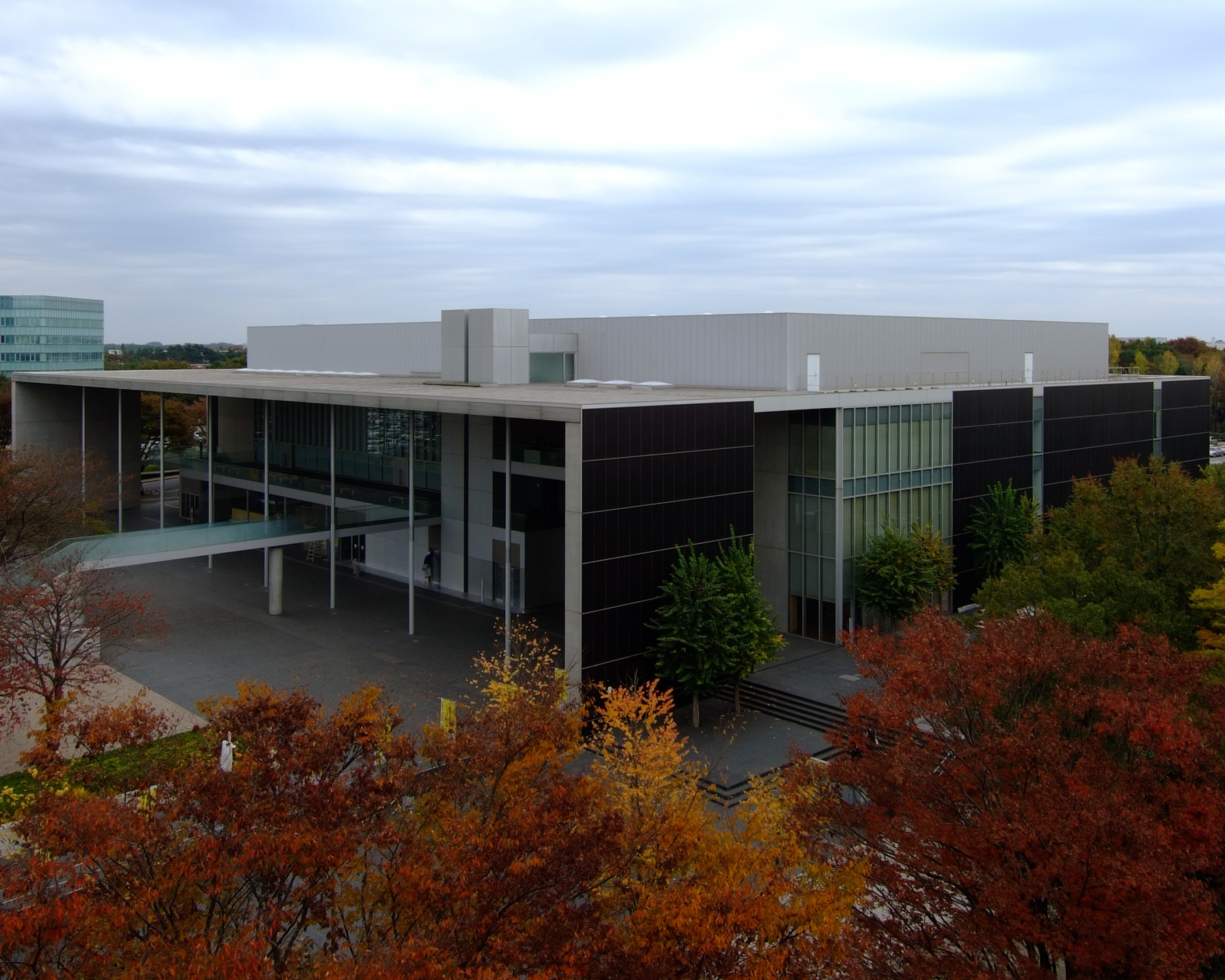
- Interactive map of Tsukuba Capio
- Full name: Tsukuba Capio
- Former names: Cyberdyne Arena
- Location: Tsukuba, Ibaraki, Japan
- Operator: Tsukuba Cultural Foundation
- Capacity: Arena 2,736; Hall 384
- Parking: 30 spaces

Construction
- Opened: July 10, 1996
- Cost
- Main contractor: Penta-Ocean

Tenants
- Tsukuba Robots (2013-16, 17-present (occasional)); Tsukuba United SunGAIA (2006-present)

Website
- https://www.tcf.or.jp/capio/

Tsukuba Capio is an arena in Tsukuba, Ibaraki, Japan. It is the former home arena of the Cyberdyne Ibaraki Robots of the B.League, Japan's professional basketball league.

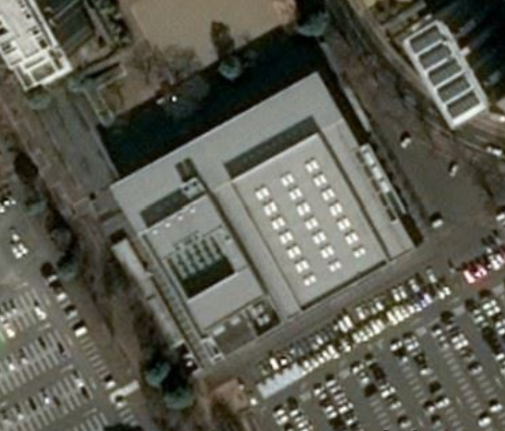
Satellite view
