= Masahiro Fujita =

Japanese basketball player and coach

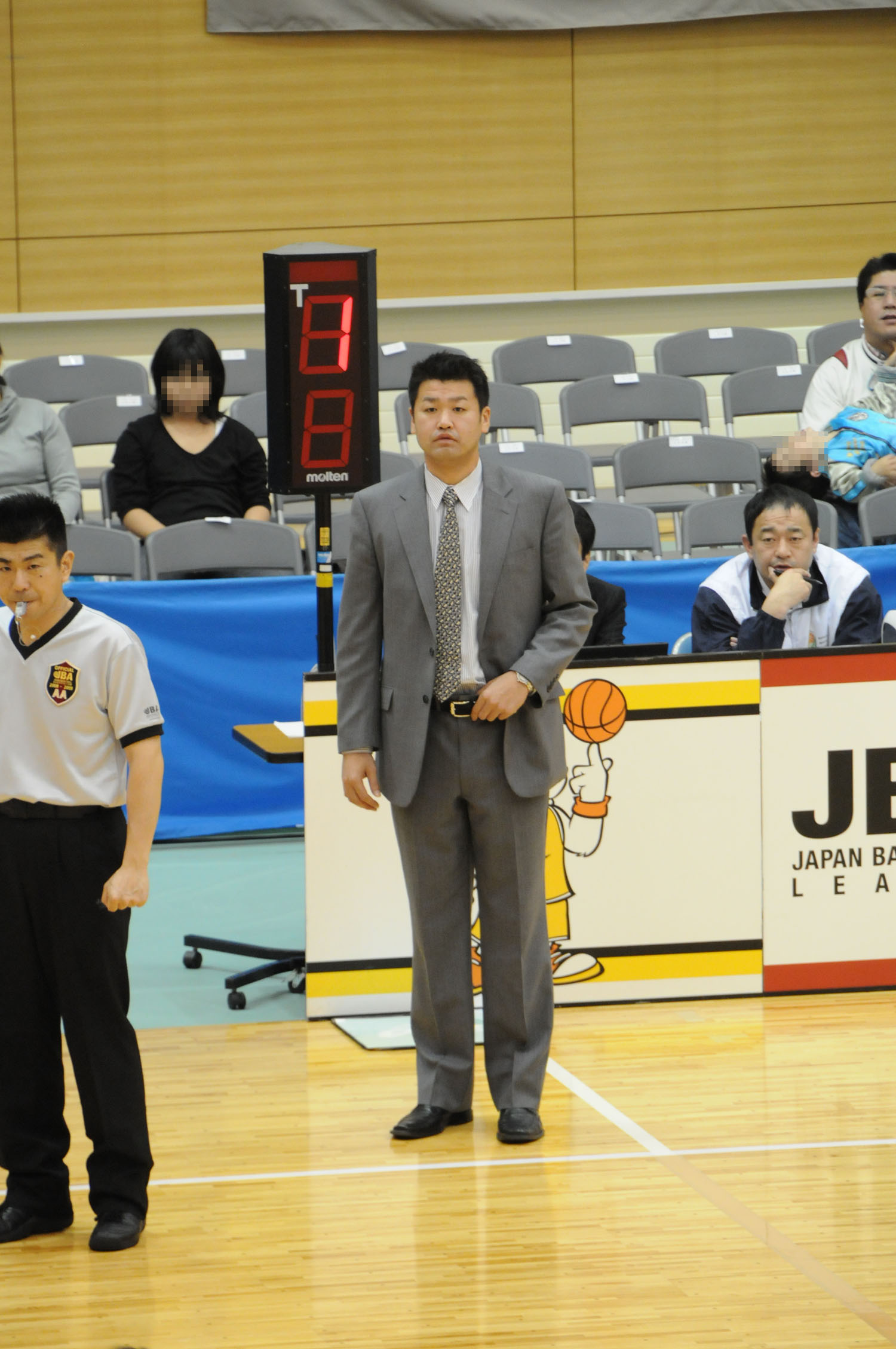

Nippon Sport Science University
- Position: Head coach

Personal information
- Born: July 16, 1970 (age 56) Chiba Prefecture

Career information
- High school: Shiritsu Funabashi (Funabashi, Chiba)
- College: Nippon Sport Science University
- Coaching career: 2002–present

Career history

Playing
- 1994-1997: Daiwa Securities
- 1997-2001: Mitsubishi Electric

Coaching
- 2002-2006: Mitsubishi Electric (asst)
- 2006-2010: Mitsubishi Electric
- 2010-present: Nippon Sport Science University

Masahiro Fujita (藤田将弘, Fujita Masahiro) is the former head coach of the Mitsubishi Electric in the Japanese JBL.

== Head coaching record ==
Legend
Regular season	G	Games coached	W	Games won	L	Games lost	W–L %	Win–loss %
Playoffs	PG	Playoff games	PW	Playoff wins	PL	Playoff losses	PW–L %	Playoff win–loss %

Team	Year	G	W	L	W–L%	Finish	PG	PW	PL	PW–L%	Result
Mitsubishi Electric	2006-07	24	17	7	.708	1st	7	6	1	.857	Runners-up in JBL
Mitsubishi Electric	2007-08	35	18	17	.514	4th	2	0	2	.000	4th
Mitsubishi Electric	2008-09	35	8	27	.229	8th	-	-	-	–	8th
Mitsubishi Electric	2009-10	42	8	34	.190	8th	-	-	-	–	8th
