= Lily Arena Mito =

Arena in Mito, Ibaraki, Japan

Coordinates: 36°22′49.2″N 140°28′57.2″E

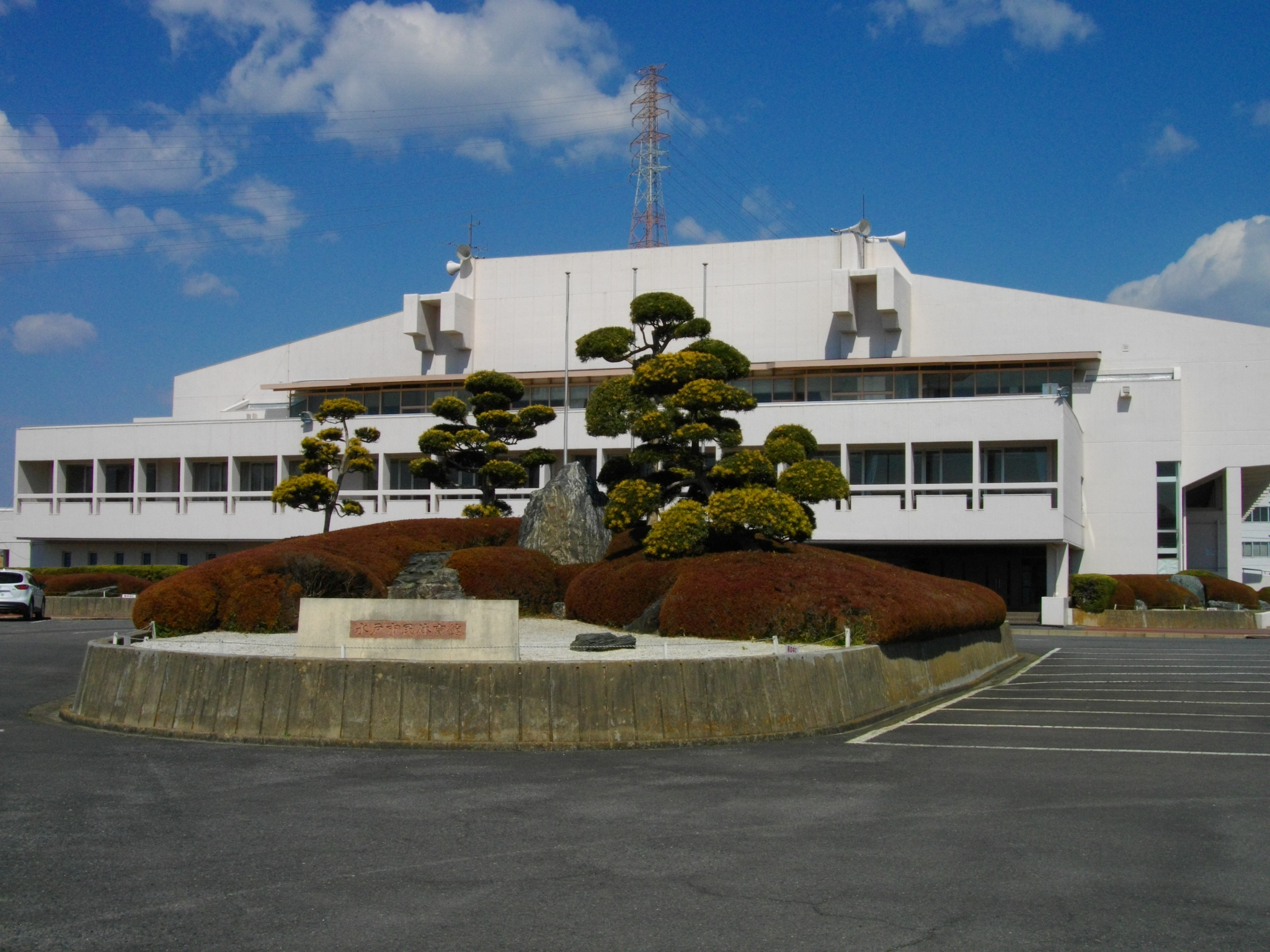
- Interactive map of Lily Arena Mito
- Full name: Mito Citizens Gymnasium
- Former names: Aoyagi Park Citizens Gymnasium
- Location: Mito, Ibaraki, Japan
- Owner: Mito city
- Operator: Mito city
- Capacity: 2,736
- Field size: 1,794.52 sqm
- Parking: 300 spaces

Construction
- Opened: 1973
- Cost: JPY 700 million

Tenant
- Cyberdyne Ibaraki Robots

Lily Arena Mito is an arena in Mito, Ibaraki, Japan. It is the home arena of the Cyberdyne Ibaraki Robots of the B.League, Japan's professional basketball league.

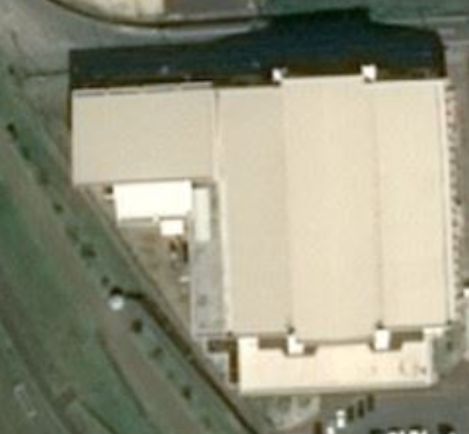
Satellite view
