= Jamie Andrisevic =

American basketball player & coach (born 1982)

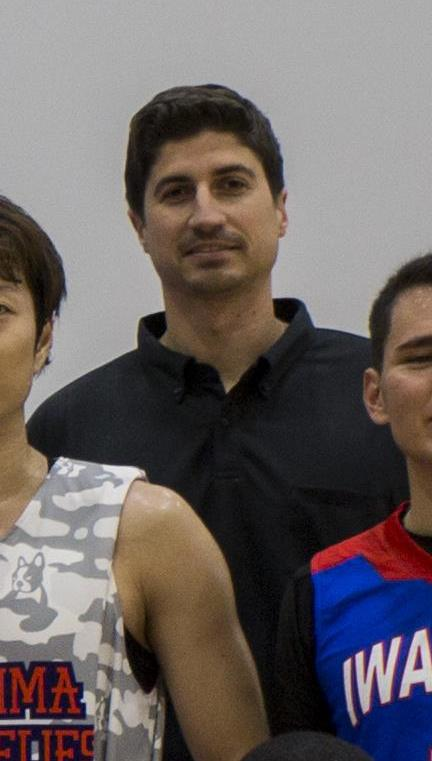

Personal information
- Born: January 22, 1982 (age 44) Kansas City, Missouri, U.S.
- Listed height: 206 cm (6 ft 9 in)
- Listed weight: 103 kg (227 lb)

Career information
- High school: Lee's Summit (Lee's Summit, Missouri)
- College: Johnson County CC (2001–2002); Arizona State (2002–2005)
- NBA draft: 2005: undrafted
- Playing career: 2005–2009
- Position: Forward
- Coaching career: 2009–present

Career history

Playing
- 2005–2006: Basketball Academie Limburg
- 2006–2007: Horsens Basketball Club
- 2008–2009: TuS Treis-Karden

Coaching
- 2009–2011: Drake (assistant)
- 2011–2012: Asker Aliens B.C.
- 2012: BC Prievidza
- 2013–2016: Santa Cruz Warriors (assistant)
- 2016: Changwon LG Sakers (assistant)
- 2016–2017: Kyoto Hannaryz (assistant)
- 2017: Hiroshima Dragonflies
- 2018–2019: Northern Arizona Suns (assistant)
- 2019–2023: Santa Cruz Warriors (assistant)

Career highlights
- As assistant coach: NBA G League champion (2015)

James Andrisevic (born January 22, 1982) is an American basketball coach and former professional player.

== Career ==
Born in Kansas City, Missouri, Andrisevic played basketball at Lee's Summit North High School in Lee's Summit, Missouri. A 6'9" power forward-center, he kicked off his college career at Johnson County Community College in 2000 and was a member of the 2001 NJCAA National Championship team, before transferring to Arizona State University in 2002. He played a total of 13 games for Arizona State tallying four points and ten rebounds.

Upon graduation 2005, Andrisevic, who earned a bachelor of arts degree in finance in 2004 and a bachelor of arts degree in marketing in 2005, took his game to Germany where he played professionally and also spent some time in Denmark.

Andrisevic served as graduate team manager and program coordinator of the men’s basketball team at Drake University from 2009 to 2011, his first head coaching position came during the 2011–12 season, when he guided the Asker Aliens of Norway’s top-flight BLNO. Under his tutelage, the Aliens reached the BLNO finals that year. Following a short stint as head coach of Slovak side BC Prievidza, Andrisevic was named assistant coach with the Santa Cruz Warriors of the NBA D-League in 2013. He helped the Warriors win the 2015 D-League championship title and was promoted associate head coach for the 2015–16 season.

In 2016, he worked as an assistant coach at Changwon LG Sakers, followed by a one-year tenure as assistant at Kyoto Hannaryz. In 2017–18, Andrisevic served as head coach of the Hiroshima Dragonflies in the Japanese B.League. In 2019, Andrisevic returned to the Santa Cruz Warriors in an assistant coaching role and has remained there.

== Head coaching record ==
Legend
Regular season	G	Games coached	W	Games won	L	Games lost	W–L %	Win–loss %
Playoffs	PG	Playoff games	PW	Playoff wins	PL	Playoff losses	PW–L %	Playoff win–loss %

Team	Year	G	W	L	W–L%	Finish	PG	PW	PL	PW–L%	Result
Hiroshima Dragonflies	2017	17	8	9	.471	Fired	-	-	-	–	-
