= Keita Iwashita =

Japanese basketball coach

Cyberdyne Ibaraki Robots
- Position: Head coach
- League: B.League

Personal information
- Born: August 25, 1988 (age 38) Kumamoto, Kumamoto

Career information
- High school: Seiseiko (Kumamoto, Kumamoto)
- College: University of Tsukuba (2004-2011)

Career history

Coaching
- 2012-2013: Daytrick Tsukuba(asst)
- 2013-2015: Tsukuba Robots (asst)
- 2014-2015: Tsukuba Robots
- 2015-2016: Cyberdyne Ibaraki Robots (asst)
- 2016-present: Cyberdyne Ibaraki Robots

Career highlights

Keita Iwashita (岩下桂太, Iwashita Keita) is the Head coach of the Cyberdyne Ibaraki Robots in the Japanese B.League.

== Head coaching record ==
Legend
Regular season	G	Games coached	W	Games won	L	Games lost	W–L %	Win–loss %
Playoffs	PG	Playoff games	PW	Playoff wins	PL	Playoff losses	PW–L %	Playoff win–loss %

Team	Year	G	W	L	W–L%	Finish	PG	PW	PL	PW–L%	Result
Tsukuba Robots	2014-15	38	6	32	.158	7th in NBL Eastern	-	-	-	–	12th in NBL
Cyberdyne Ibaraki Robots	2016-17	60	32	28	.533	2nd in B2 Eastern	-	-	-	–	-
