= Hugh Watanabe =

Japanese-American basketball player (born 1998)

Hugh Watanabe 渡邉 飛勇
No. 34 – Ibaraki Robots
- Position: Power forward
- League: B.League

Personal information
- Born: December 23, 1998 (age 27) Waimānalo, Hawaiʻi, U.S.
- Listed height: 2.07 m (6 ft 9 in)
- Listed weight: 106 kg (234 lb)

Career information
- High school: ʻIolani School (Honolulu, Hawaiʻi)
- College: Portland (2017–2020); UC Davis (2020–2021)
- Playing career: 2021–present

Career history
- 2021–2024: Ryukyu Golden Kings
- 2024–2026: Shinshu Brave Warriors
- 2026–present: Ibaraki Robots

Career highlights
- B.League champion (2023)
Medals
Men's basketball
Representing Japan
William Jones Cup
Bronze medal – third place	2019 Taiwan	Team

Hugh Watanabe (渡邉 飛勇, ワタナべ·ヒュー, Watanabe Hyū; born December 23, 1998), also known as Hugh Hogland, is a Japanese-American professional basketball player for the Ibaraki Robots of the B.League. He played college basketball for the Portland Pilots and the UC Davis Aggies. Watanabe has been a member of the Japanese national team.

== Early life ==
Watanabe was born in Waimānalo, Hawaiʻi to a Japanese mother, Sanae Watanabe, and an American father, Matthew Hogland. He played volleyball and baseball as a child but after sustaining an injury, Watanabe gave up baseball and started playing basketball and soccer for fun. He focused more towards volleyball in eighth grade and was a standout prep volleyball player. He was a part of the team that finished fifth in a national competition. Watanabe was a member of the USA youth and junior national volleyball teams before he decided to pursue collegiate basketball.

== High school career ==
Watanabe attended ʻIolani School and played four years of varsity basketball for the Raiders. As a freshman, he was a part of the team that won the state championship. As a sophomore, Watanabe helped the Raiders to finish runner-up in the state tournament. As a junior, he led the team to state championship, averaging 14.7 points, 8.5 rebounds, 3.2 assists and 2.9 blocks per game. In his efforts, Watanabe was named Honolulu Star-Advertiser State Player of the Year, Gatorade State Player of the Year, and the Division I State Tournament Most Outstanding Player. As a senior, he led the Raiders to its fourth consecutive state tournament appearance, logging a double-double average with 15.5 points and 10.2 rebounds, to go along with 4.0 assists and 3.1 blocks per game. Watanabe earned both the All-Interscholastic League of Honolulu First Team and the Hawaiʻi State All-Tournament selection three times and was named to the Iolani Classic First Team twice.

== College career ==
=== Portland ===
Watanabe attended the University of Portland and played for the Pilots. After redshirting his freshman year, he made his collegiate debut on November 6, 2018, posting two points, six rebounds and a steal. On December 8, Watanabe scored a season-high 13 points in a win over Sacramento State. On February 28, 2019, Watanabe grabbed a season-high nine rebounds against Saint Mary's. As a sophomore, he averaged 4.4 points, 3.2 rebounds and 0.5 assists in 15.4 minute per game while shooting 53.6 percent from the field.

Watanabe grabbed a season-high five rebounds on November 20 and December 23, 2019. He scored a season-high six points on December 1 and 13. As a junior, Watanabe averaged 2.8 points, 2.2 rebounds and 0.4 assists in 10.7 minutes per game while shooting 48.3 percent from the field.

=== UC Davis ===
After earning a bachelor's degree in finance, Watanabe transferred to the University of California, Davis, where he enrolled in the MBA program. Due to NCAA COVID-19 eligibility rules, he had two years of eligibility. Watanabe, who suffered from a hand injury earlier the season, played two games with the Aggies, including one start, averaging 3.0 points, 2.0 rebounds and 0.5 assists in 20.0 minutes per game while shooting 33.3 percent from the field.

Watanabe decided to forego his final year of college eligibility to play professional basketball.

== Professional career ==
=== Ryukyu Golden Kings (2021–2024) ===
On June 18, 2021, Watanabe signed with the Ryukyu Golden Kings of the B.League. On September 4, he sustained an injury on his right elbow during a practice match against the Akita Northern Happinets. Three days later, Watanabe underwent surgery after being diagnosed with a fractured radial head. He was estimated to be sidelined between four and five months and was entered in the Injury List. On December 24, Watanabe was removed from the list and was cleared to participate fully in practices. On January 17, 2022, CT scan results revealed the displacement of bone fragments in his right elbow. He underwent closed reduction and bone graft surgeries at Ryukyu University Hospital on January 20. On January 22, Watanabe was ruled out for the entire 2021–22 season. On August 5, Watanabe went under the knife for the third time in less than a year, receiving a radial head replacement surgery for his injured elbow in Los Angeles. He was estimated to be sidelined for four to six months.

On February 5, 2023, Watanabe made his professional debut against the Toyoma Grouses, scoring seven points and grabbing six rebounds in 12 minutes of play. Watanabe helped the Golden Kings defeat the Chiba Jets to claim their first B.League championship title. On June 7, the team announced they signed Watanabe for the 2023–24 season.

=== Shinshu Brave Warriors (2024-present) ===
Hugh would sign with the Shinshu Brave Warriors of the B League's 2nd division for the 2024-2025 season. He had a season high 18 points on October 20th, 2024 against the Aomori Watts. He then reached 18 again on March 26th, 2025 against the Fukui Blowinds. Shinshu would finish 3rd place in the East District standings and would ultimately reach and win the 3rd place best of 3 series against the Rising Zephyr Fukuoka, though Hugh did not appear in a single post season game due to injury.

Hugh returned to Shinshu for the 2025-2026 season. On November 11th, 2025 he would score a season high 11 points in a game against Fukushima. Shinshi would finish 1st place in the East District standings.

== National team career ==
After Watanabe's mother sent an email to the Japan Basketball Association, he was called up to join the training camps of the national team. Watanabe made his international debut for Japan at the 2019 William Jones Cup, where he helped the team win the bronze medal. He suited up for Japan at the 2021 FIBA Asia Cup Qualifiers, where he only played in one game. Watanabe was named to the 12-man roster for the 2020 Summer Olympics, where he is set to become the youngest player to represent Japan in basketball.

== Personal life ==
Watanabe is from a sports family. His brother, Cole, was a middle blocker for the University of Hawaiʻi men's volleyball team. His father, Matthew, played baseball at Southern Oregon. His paternal grandfather, Doug Hogland, was an offensive linemen in the NFL for the San Francisco 49ers, Chicago Cardinals and Detroit Lions from 1953 to 1958.

Watanabe holds dual citizenship for the United States and Japan.

== Career statistics ==
Legend
GP	Games played	GS	Games started	MPG	Minutes per game
FG%	Field goal percentage	3P%	3-point field goal percentage	FT%	Free throw percentage
RPG	Rebounds per game	APG	Assists per game	SPG	Steals per game
BPG	Blocks per game	PPG	Points per game	**Bold**	Career high

=== College ===
Year	Team	GP	GS	MPG	FG%	3P%	FT%	RPG	APG	SPG	BPG	PPG
2017–18	Portland	Redshirt										
2018–19	Portland	**30**	**3**	15.4	**.536**	–	.560	**3.2**	**.5**	.3	.3	**4.4**
2019–20	Portland	13	0	35.1	.483	.000	.667	2.2	.4	.1	.8	2.8
2020–21	UC Davis	2	1	**20.0**	.333	–	**1.000**	2.0	**.5**	**1.0**	**1.5**	3.0
Career		45	4	14.2	.515	.000	.594	2.8	.5	.3	.5	3.9
