= Edward Yamamoto =

Philippine-born Japanese basketball player

Sherwin Edward Yamamoto
No. 3 – Aquatech
- Position: Shooting guard

Personal information
- Born: December 2, 1986 (age 39) Caloocan, Philippines
- Listed height: 5 ft 9 in (1.75 m)
- Listed weight: 174 lb (79 kg)

Career information
- High school: Hokuriku (Fukui, Fukui)
- College: Daito Bunka University

Career history
- 2010–2018: Shimane Susanoo Magic
- 2018–2020: Toyotsu Fighting Eagles Nagoya
- 2020–2021: Shinshu Brave Warriors
- 2021–2023: Nagasaki Velca
- 2023: Kagawa Five Arrows
- 2024–: Aquatech

Career highlights
- B2 Three Point FG Leader (2016–17); bj League MIP (2011-12)

Edward Yamamoto (山本 エドワード, Yamamoto Edowādo; born December 2, 1986) is a Philippine-born Japanese professional basketball player who last played for the Kagawa Five Arrows in Japan. He moved to Yonago, Tottori, Japan at the age of seven. He was selected by the Shimane Susanoo Magic with the 14th overall pick in the 2010 bj League draft. He also plays for the 3storm Hiroshima.Exe.

== Early life and education ==
Born in Caloocan, Philippines, Edward Yamamoto was born to Filipino parents. Edward's father died when he was at a young age. His mother then married a Japanese national and his family emigrated to Japan when Edward was seven years old. Spending a part of his childhood in the Philippines, he continued playing basketball when he moved to Japan. Yamamoto resided at Yonago while attending Hokuriku High School in Fukui and at Daito Bunka University in Tokyo.

== Career ==
Yamamoto would be considered as a local or domestic player in the B.League due to his history of attending Japanese schools. He turned professional when he joined the Shimane Susanoo Magic when it was part of the Bj league in 2010. He remained with the team when it joined the B.League in 2016. He moved to the Toyotsu Fighting Eagles Nagoya of the B2 League in 2018 before moving back to the first division when he signed up to play for the Shinshu Brave Warriors in 2020. After playing a season for Shinshu, Yamamoto moved to third division team, Nagasaki Velca.

== Career statistics ==
Legend
GP	Games played	GS	Games started	MPG	Minutes per game
FG%	Field goal percentage	3P%	3-point field goal percentage	FT%	Free throw percentage
RPG	Rebounds per game	APG	Assists per game	SPG	Steals per game
BPG	Blocks per game	PPG	Points per game	**Bold**	Career high

*	Led the league

Year	Team	GP	GS	MPG	FG%	3P%	FT%	RPG	APG	SPG	BPG	PPG
2010–11	Shimane	47	9	14.6	.301	.260	.920	1.7	1.7	0.7	0.0	3.3
2011–12	Shimane	52	50	32.9	.377	.304	.690	3.6	4.8	1.2	0.1	6.1
2012–13	Shimane	51	22	25.1	.438	.392	.686	2.6	3.5	0.7	0.0	6.3
2013–14	Shimane	52	33	27.8	.424	.381	.739	2.1	4.4	0.9	0.0	7.9
2014–15	Shimane	52	48	31.3	.444	.440	.857	2.7	3.4	0.8	0.0	12.2
2015–16	Shimane	50	45	27.5	.366	.343	.886	2.9	2.5	1.5	0.0	9.1
2016–17	Shimane	60	60	26.5	.444	.453*	.869	2.8	2.7	1.0	0.0	9.4
2017–18	Shimane	48	18	18.8	.386	.317	.750	1.2	2.1	0.8	0.0	4.5
