= Shinsaku Enomoto =

Japanese basketball player (born 1998)

Shinsaku Enomoto 榎本 新作
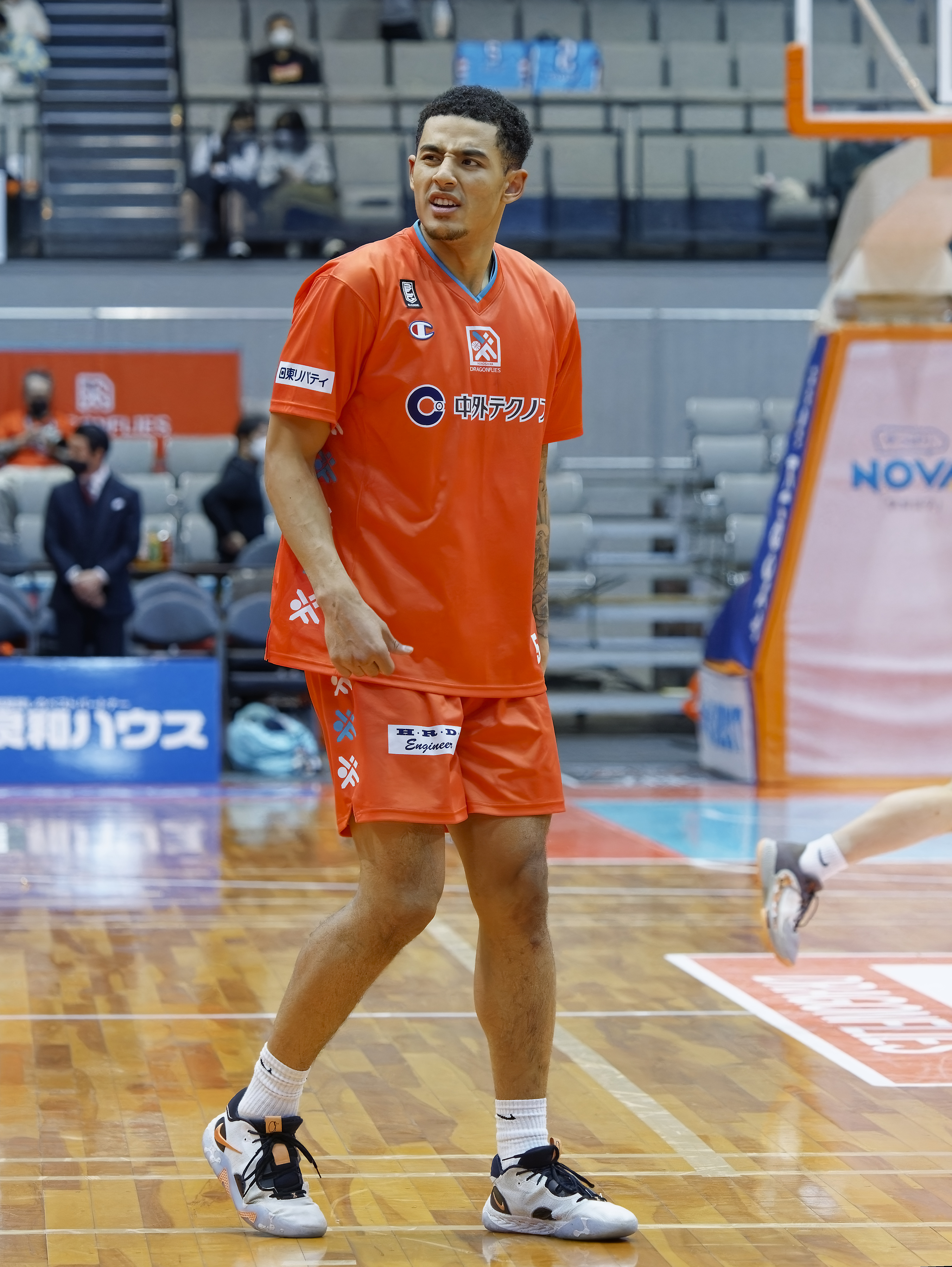
- Enomoto with the Hiroshima Dragonflies in 2024

No. 5 – Nagoya Diamond Dolphins
- Position: Shooting guard / point guard
- League: B.League

Personal information
- Born: 10 April 1998 (age 28) Okinawa, Japan
- Listed height: 1.96 m (6 ft 5 in)
- Listed weight: 88 kg (194 lb)

Career information
- High school: Cienega High School (Vail, Arizona)
- College: Pima CC (2016–2018); Eastern New Mexico (2018–2020)
- Playing career: 2020–present

Career history
- 2020–2024: Hiroshima Dragonflies
- 2024–present: Nagoya Diamond Dolphins

Career highlights
- B1 League champion (2024)

Shinsaku Enomoto (榎本 新作, Enomoto Shinsaku; born 10 April 1998), also known as Isaiah Murphy (アイザイア・マーフィー, Aizaia Māfī), is a Japanese professional basketball player for the Nagoya Diamond Dolphins of the B.League. He played college basketball for Pima Community College and the Eastern New Mexico Greyhounds.

== Early life ==
Enomoto was born in Okinawa to a Japanese mother, Fusako, and an American father, James, who was stationed there while serving in the Air Force. He moved to Misawa and Anchorage, Alaska before settling in Arizona during his sophomore season of high school. While in high school, Enomoto had a heated rivalry with good friend Benjamin "Nordi" Noriega. Enomoto credits Nordi with his current playstyle and playmaking abilities.

== College career ==
Enomoto considered joining the Air Force before deciding to attend Pima Community College. As a sophomore, he led the Aztecs to an NJCAA Division II runner-up finish. Enomato averaged 15.9 points and 4.1 rebounds per game and was selected first team All-ACCAC. Following the season, he transferred to Eastern New Mexico. In his two seasons at Eastern New Mexico, he averaged 8.1 points, 2.9 rebounds and 1.5 assists per game.

== Professional career ==
=== Hiroshima Dragonflies (2020–present) ===
On June 29, 2020, Enomoto signed his first professional contract, a one-year deal, with Hiroshima Dragonflies of the B.League. He played in all 55 games, made 44 starts, averaging 9.5 points, 2.6 rebounds, 2.1 assists and 1.0 steals per game while shooting 39.5 percent from the field and 31.0 percent from three. After an impressive rookie campaign, he was named to the B.League Best Five Rookies.

On May 13, 2021, Enomoto re-signed with the team for another season.

== National team career ==
After Enomoto's mother sent a highlight reel to the national team assistant coaches, he was invited to a tryout where he made the cut. Enomoto first represented Japan at the 2017 FIBA Under-19 Basketball World Cup, where he averaged 3.7 points, 2.9 rebounds and 1.1 assists per game. His tournament highlights included a 12-point and 8-rebound outing in a loss to Italy.
