= Hiroshi Kajiyama =

Hiroshi Kajiyama may refer to:

- Hiroshi Kajiyama (politician) (born 1955), Japanese politician of the Liberal Democratic Party
- Hiroshi Kajiyama (gymnast) (born 1953), Japanese former gymnast
