= Eric Jacobsen (basketball) =

American basketball player (born 1994)

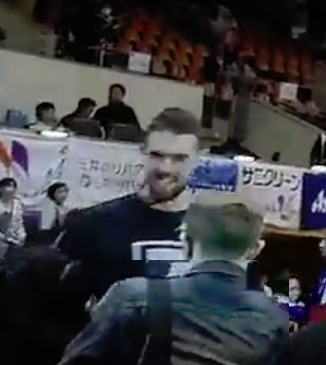

No. 21 – Ibaraki Robots
- Position: Center / power forward
- League: B.League

Personal information
- Born: June 2, 1994 (age 31) Chandler, Arizona, U.S.
- Listed height: 208 cm (6 ft 10 in)
- Listed weight: 107 kg (236 lb)

Career information
- High school: Hamilton (Chandler, Arizona)
- College: Arizona State (2012–2016)
- NBA draft: 2016: undrafted
- Playing career: 2016–present

Career history
- 2016–2017: Adelaide 36ers
- 2017–2019: Rizing Zephyr Fukuoka
- 2020–2021: Sendai 89ers
- 2021–: Ibaraki Robots

Eric Jacobsen (born June 2, 1994) is an American professional basketball player for Ibaraki Robots of the B.League. The Arizona-born big man played four years of college basketball for Arizona State before starting his professional career in 2016.

== Early years ==
Jacobsen attended Hamilton High School in Chandler, Arizona, where he was highly recruited. Having offers with multiple Divisions I schools. But untimely signed with Arizona State. Averaged 12.4 points and 10.3 boards per game in his senior season at Hamilton High School and led Hamilton to an 18–11 record his junior year while averaging 15.9 points, 11.7 rebounds, and 2.3 blocks per game.

College recruiting information
Name	Hometown	School	Height	Weight	Commit date
Eric Jacobsen; C	Chandler, AZ	Hamilton HS (AZ)	6 ft 8 in (2.03 m)	222 lb (101 kg)	May 2, 2011
Eric Jacobsen; C	Recruit ratings: Scout: Rivals: 247Sports: ESPN: (88)				
Overall recruit ranking:
Note: In many cases, Scout, Rivals, 247Sports, On3, and ESPN may conflict in their listings of height and weight.; In these cases, the average was taken. ESPN grades are on a 100-point scale.; Sources: "2011 Team Ranking". Rivals.com.

== College career ==
=== Freshman and sophomore years ===
Posted a season high 16 points off the bench against Hartford in a win. Played in 32 games in freshman season and shot .488 from the field. Jacobsen saw his role solidify during his sophomore seeing his minutes and usage in important scenarios increase. Started in all of ASU's final 15 games this year and in an NCAA tournament game.

=== Junior and senior years ===
Jacobsen saw his best year junior year (2014–15) where he averaged a career high 8.3 points per game. For the first time in his Sun Devil career Jacobsen scored 20 points and grabbed a team nine rebounds in a win against Pepperdine on December 13. Started and played in all 32 games during his senior season. Led ASU by shooting 57.6% FG, making (91–158) total field goals.

=== College statistics ===
Year	Team	GP	GS	MPG	FG%	3P%	FT%	RPG	APG	SPG	BPG	PPG
2012–13	Arizona State	31	1	7.5	.488	.000	.500	1.3	0.2	.0	0.1	1.7
2013–14	Arizona State	32	15	10.9	.491	.000	.610	2.2	0.2	0.2	0.4	2.4
2014–15	Arizona State	34	34	28.6	.626	.000	.569	5.9	0.9	0.5	1.2	8.2
2015–16	Arizona State	32	32	28.9	.476	.500	.639	5.0	0.5	0.2	0.9	7.6
Career		129	82	19.5	.576	.500	.590	3.7	0.5	0.3	0.6	5.1

== Professional career ==
After going undrafted in the 2016 NBA draft Jacobsen played in the 2016 NBA Summer League as a member of the Cleveland Cavaliers. In seven game he averaged 3.4 pointer per game while only playing 9.1 minutes per game. He did not make the Cavs pre-season roster.

In July 2016 Jacobsen was chosen for the final roster spot of the Adelaide 36ers.

In August 2017 Jacobsen was signed to play in Fukuoka, Japan for the Rizing Zephyr Fukuoka.
