= Tenketsu Harimoto =

Chinese-born Japanese basketball player

Tenketsu Harimoto 張天傑
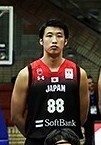
- Harimoto with national team

No. 8 – Nagoya Diamond Dolphins
- Position: Power forward
- League: B.League

Personal information
- Born: January 8, 1992 (age 34) Shenyang, Liaoning, China
- Listed height: 6 ft 6 in (1.98 m)
- Listed weight: 225 lb (102 kg)

Career information
- High school: Chubu University Daiichi High (Nisshin, Aichi)
- College: Aoyama Gakuin University
- Playing career: 2013–present

Career history
- 2013–2016: Toyota Alvark
- 2016–present: Nagoya Diamond Dolphins
Medals
Representing Japan
Men's basketball
Asian Games
Bronze medal – third place	2014 South Korea	Team competition
William Jones Cup
Bronze medal – third place	2019 ROC	Team

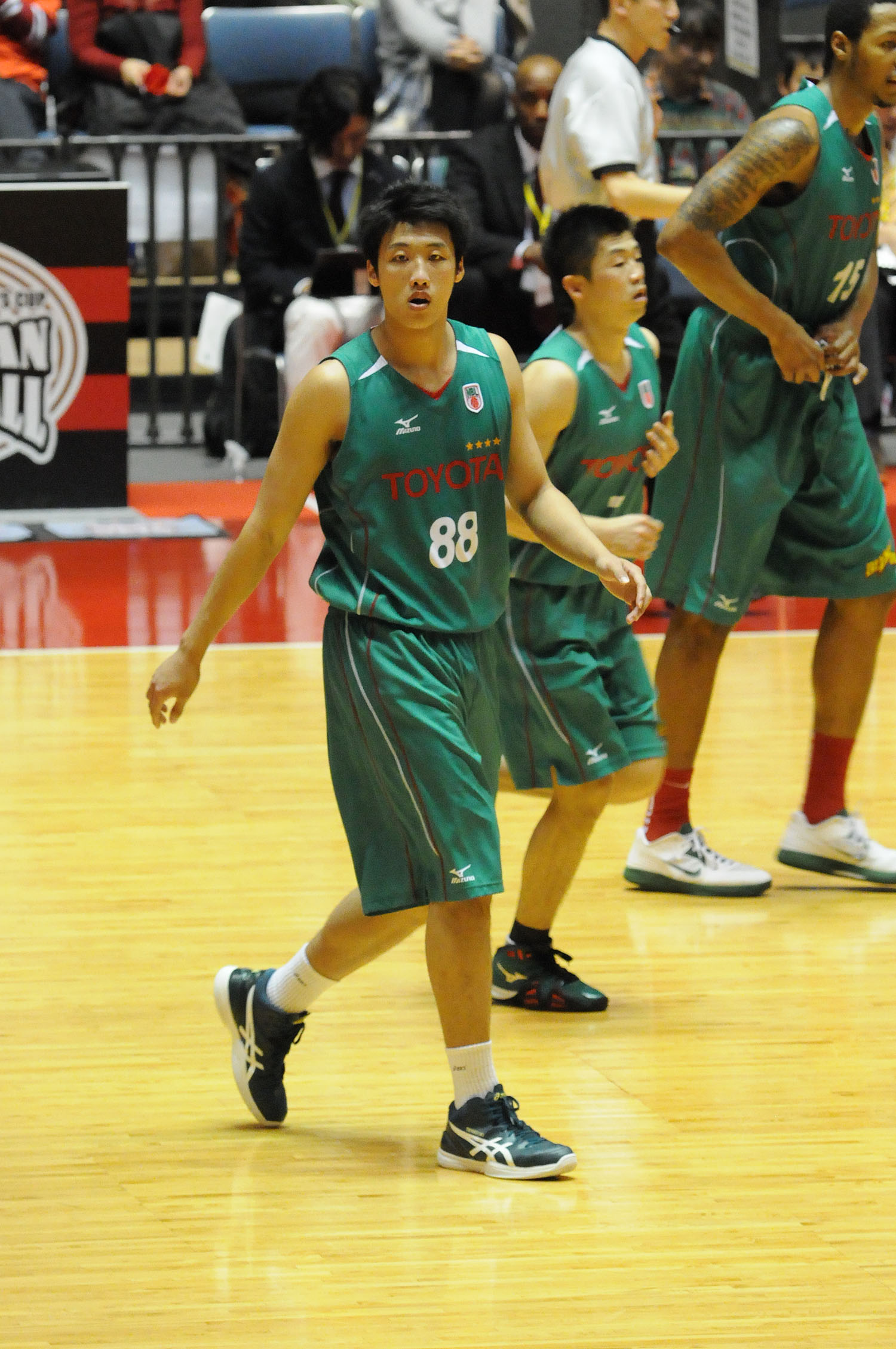
Harimoto as the small forward for Alvark Tokyo, Yoyogi National Gymnasium, 2015

Tenketsu Harimoto (張本 天傑, Harimoto Tenketsu; born January 8, 1992), birth name Zhang Tianjie (simplified Chinese: 张天杰; traditional Chinese: 張天傑), is a Chinese-born Japanese professional basketball player. He currently plays for the Nagoya Diamond Dolphins club of the B.League in Japan.

He represented Japan's national basketball team at the 2017 FIBA Asia Cup, where he was Japan's best free throw shooter (free throws made).

== Personal ==
Harimoto is from a family of diverse athletes. His father was a basketball player, his mother was a volleyball player, his grandfather was a fencing coach, and his uncle was a badminton player.
