= Shingo Kajiyama =

Japanese basketball player

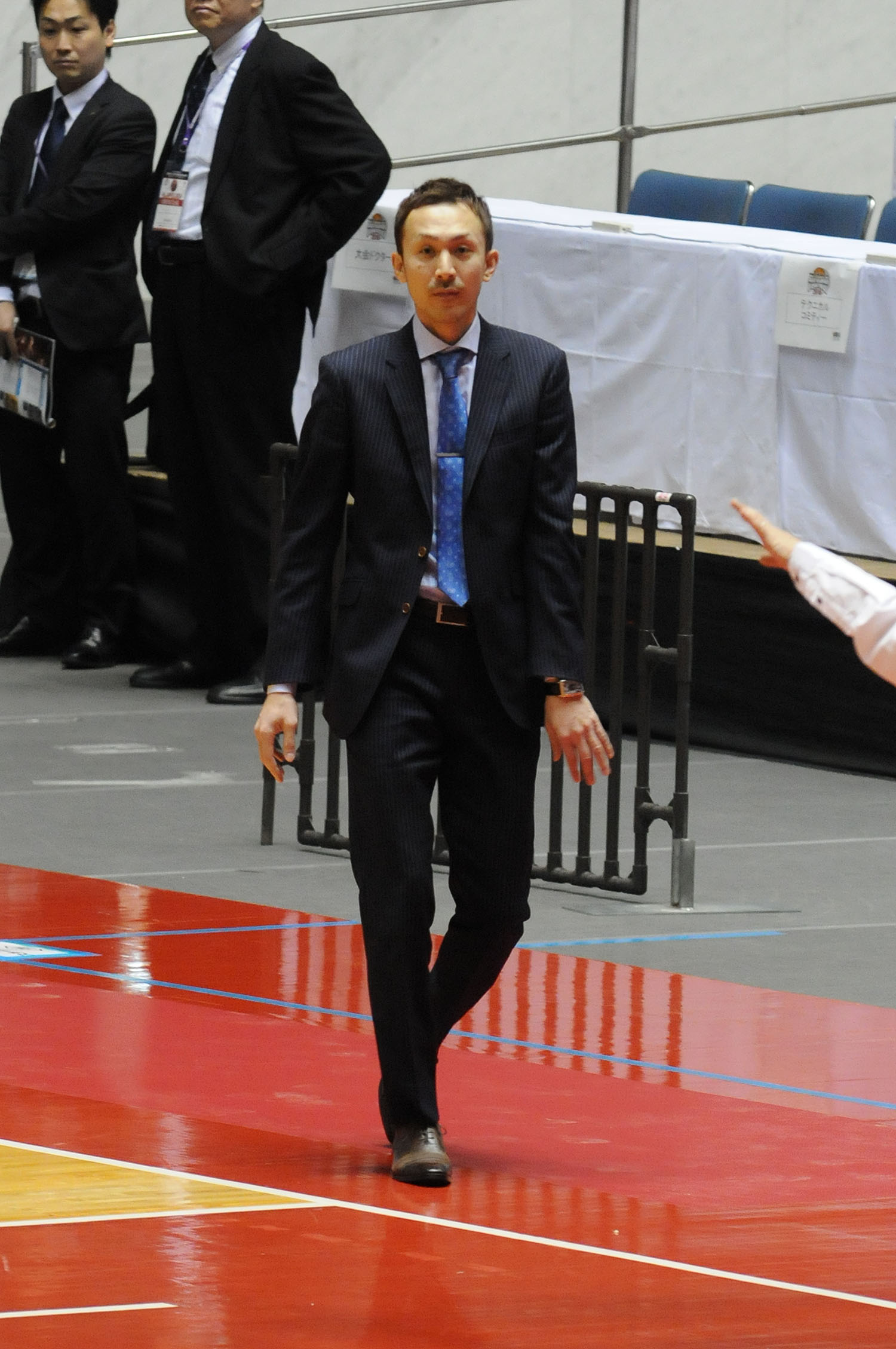

Nagoya Diamond Dolphins
- Position: Head coach
- League: B.League

Personal information
- Born: October 28, 1976 (age 50) Higashiosaka, Osaka

Career information
- High school: Daisho Gakuen (Toyonaka, Osaka)
- College: Nihon University
- Coaching career: 2017–present

Career history

Playing
- 1999-2013: Mitsubishi Electric

Coaching
- 2013-2017: Mitsubishi Electric (asst)
- 2017-: Nagoya Diamond Dolphins

Shingo Kajiyama (梶山信吾, Kajiyama Shingo) is the Head coach of the Nagoya Diamond Dolphins in the Japanese B.League.

== Career statistics ==
Legend
GP	Games played	GS	Games started	MPG	Minutes per game
FG%	Field goal percentage	3P%	3-point field goal percentage	FT%	Free throw percentage
RPG	Rebounds per game	APG	Assists per game	SPG	Steals per game
BPG	Blocks per game	PPG	Points per game	**Bold**	Career high

Year	Team	GP	GS	MPG	FG%	3P%	FT%	RPG	APG	SPG	BPG	PPG
2007-13	Mitsubishi	162		24.5	.333	.363	.754	2.0	1.0	0.5	0.1	5.8

== Head coaching record ==
Legend
Regular season	G	Games coached	W	Games won	L	Games lost	W–L %	Win–loss %
Playoffs	PG	Playoff games	PW	Playoff wins	PL	Playoff losses	PW–L %	Playoff win–loss %

Team	Year	G	W	L	W–L%	Finish	PG	PW	PL	PW–L%	Result
Nagoya Diamond Dolphins	2017-18	60	31	29	.517	2nd in Central	3	1	2	.333	Lost in 1st round
Nagoya Diamond Dolphins	2018-19	60	33	27	.550	2nd in Western	3	1	2	.333	Lost in 1st round
Nagoya Diamond Dolphins	2019-20	41	17	24	.415	5th in Western	-	-	-	–	-
