= Ryosuke Shirahama =

Japanese professional basketball player (born 1991)

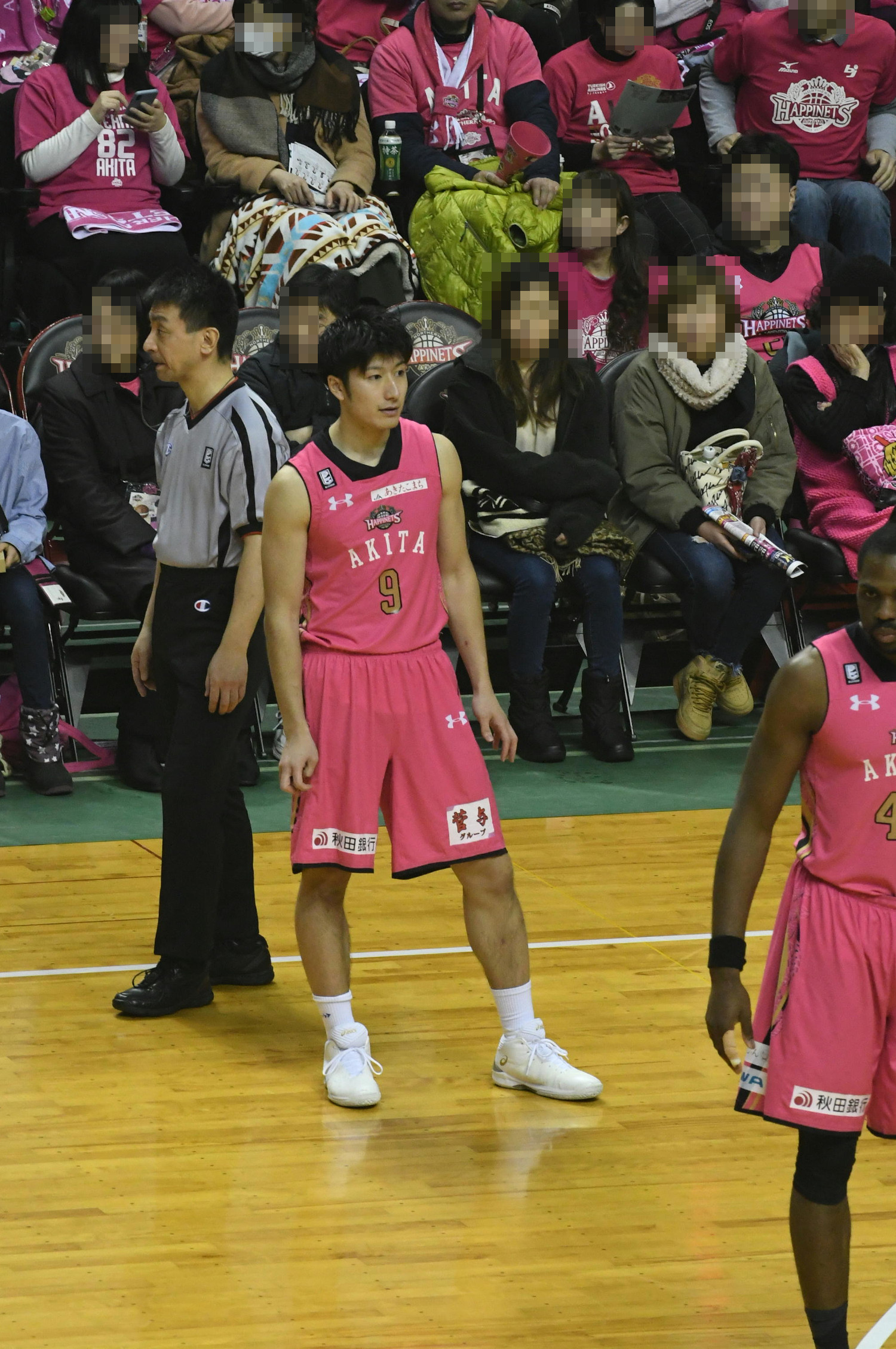
- Shirahama in 2015

No. 15 – Shimane Susanoo Magic
- Position: Forward
- League: B.League

Personal information
- Born: August 29, 1991 (age 35) Shiroishi, Saga, Japan
- Listed height: 6 ft 3 in (1.91 m)
- Listed weight: 187 lb (85 kg)

Career information
- High school: Sagakita (Saga, Japan)
- College: Hakuoh University (2009–2013)
- Playing career: 2014–present

Career history
- 2014–2016: Aisin Seahorses Mikawa
- 2016–2020: Akita Northern Happinets
- 2020–present: Shimane Susanoo Magic

Career highlights
- 2× B.League All-Star (2017, 2019)

Ryosuke Shirahama (白濱 僚祐, Shirahama Ryōsuke; born August 29, 1991) is a Japanese professional basketball player who plays for the Shimane Susanoo Magic of the B.League in Japan. His nickname is "Hama". On April 13, 2019, he scored 21 points in a win to the Levanga Hokkaido. He and Chanson V-Magic player, Satomi Ochiai have registered their marriage in June 2019. He has been appointed the new captain of the team in August 2019.

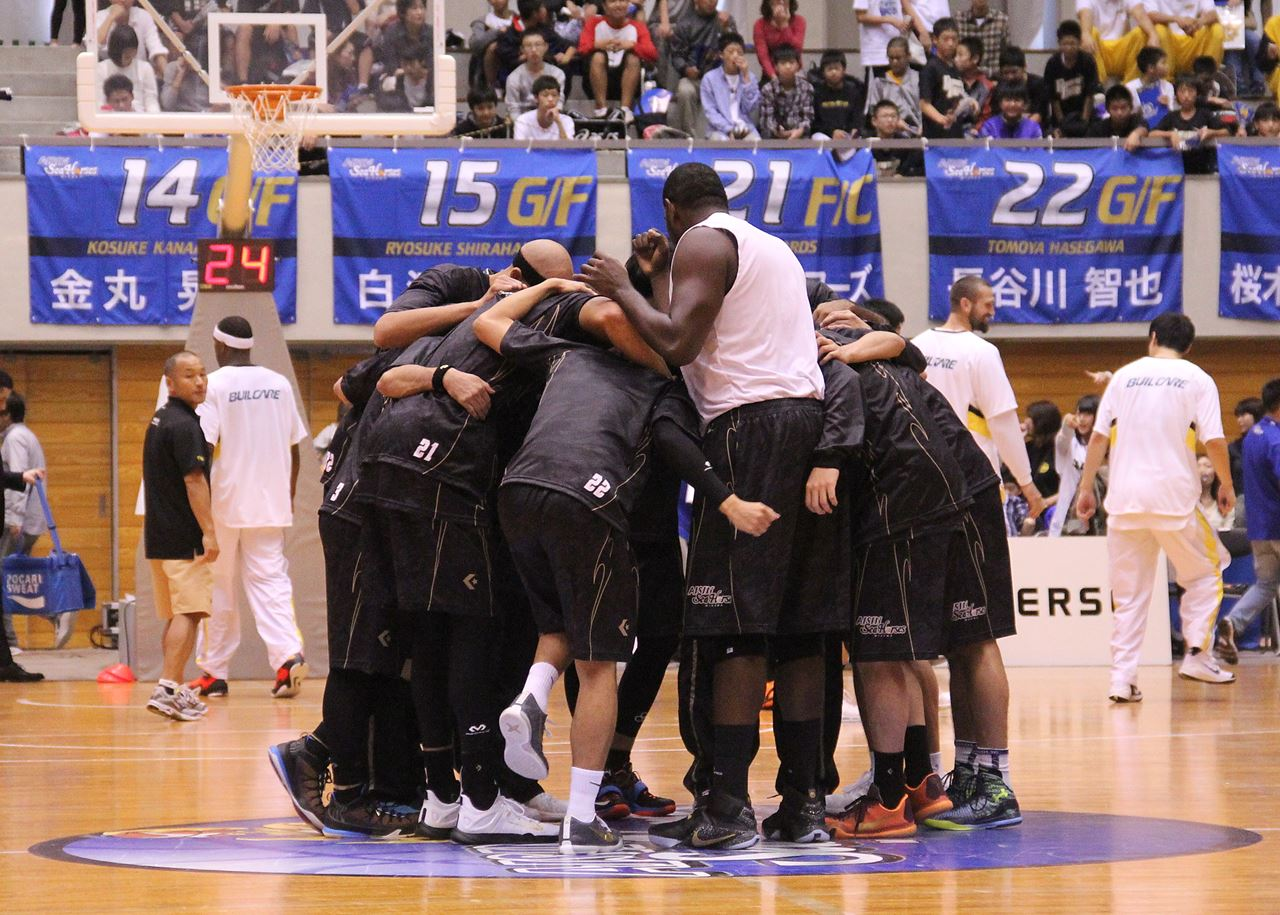
Shirahama and teammates

== Career statistics ==
Legend
GP	Games played	GS	Games started	MPG	Minutes per game
FG%	Field goal percentage	3P%	3-point field goal percentage	FT%	Free throw percentage
RPG	Rebounds per game	APG	Assists per game	SPG	Steals per game
BPG	Blocks per game	PPG	Points per game	**Bold**	Career high

†	Denotes seasons in which Shirahama won an championship

=== Regular season ===
Year	Team	GP	GS	MPG	FG%	3P%	FT%	RPG	APG	SPG	BPG	PPG
NBL 2013–14	Aisin	3	0	5.3	40.0	0	–	0.0	0.0	0.0	0.0	1.3
NBL 2014–15†	Aisin	37	0	6.8	41.7	18.2	66.7	0.6	0.4	0.3	0.1	1.8
NBL 2015–16	Aisin	24	0	2.8	40.9	25.0	33.3	0.1	0.1	0.0	0.0	0.9
2016–17	Akita	43	**42**	**23.4**	39.3	**38.4**	67.3	2.4	1.7	0.8	0.2	6.0
2017–18	Akita	**57**	**42**	19.7	**43.5**	36.3	55.8	**2.9**	1.8	**1.4**	**0.3**	**8.0**
2018–19	Akita	**57**	37	23.7	38.2	31.7	**72.2**	2.1	**2.3**	0.9	0.2	5.8
2019–20	Akita	32	11	17.8	38.5	22.2	60.0	1.8	1.6	0.8	0.2	3.8
Career		253	132	17.3	40.5	33.2	63.2	1.9	1.5	0.8	0.2	5.0

=== Playoffs ===
Year	Team	GP	GS	MPG	FG%	3P%	FT%	RPG	APG	SPG	BPG	PPG
2014–15	Aisin	4		4.5	.400	.000	.000	0.5	0.5	0.0	0.0	1.0
2017–18	Akita	5	3	15:19	.424	.400	.500	1.6	2.8	0.8	0	7.0

=== Early cup games ===
Year	Team	GP	GS	MPG	FG%	3P%	FT%	RPG	APG	SPG	BPG	PPG
2017	Akita	2	0	18:40	.667	.500	1.000	3.5	1.5	1.5	0.0	14.0
2019	Akita	2	2	25:17	.364	.250	.500	0.5	2.0	0.5	0.0	5.0

=== Preseason games ===
Year	Team	GP	GS	MPG	FG%	3P%	FT%	RPG	APG	SPG	BPG	PPG
2018	Akita	2	2	18.9	.200	.000	.000	1.5	2.5	1.0	0.3	2.0
2019	Akita	3	1	18.7	.462	.500	.500	0.7	3.3	2.0	0.3	5.3

Source: Changwon1Changwon2 Source: UtsunomiyaToyamaSendai

== Trivia ==
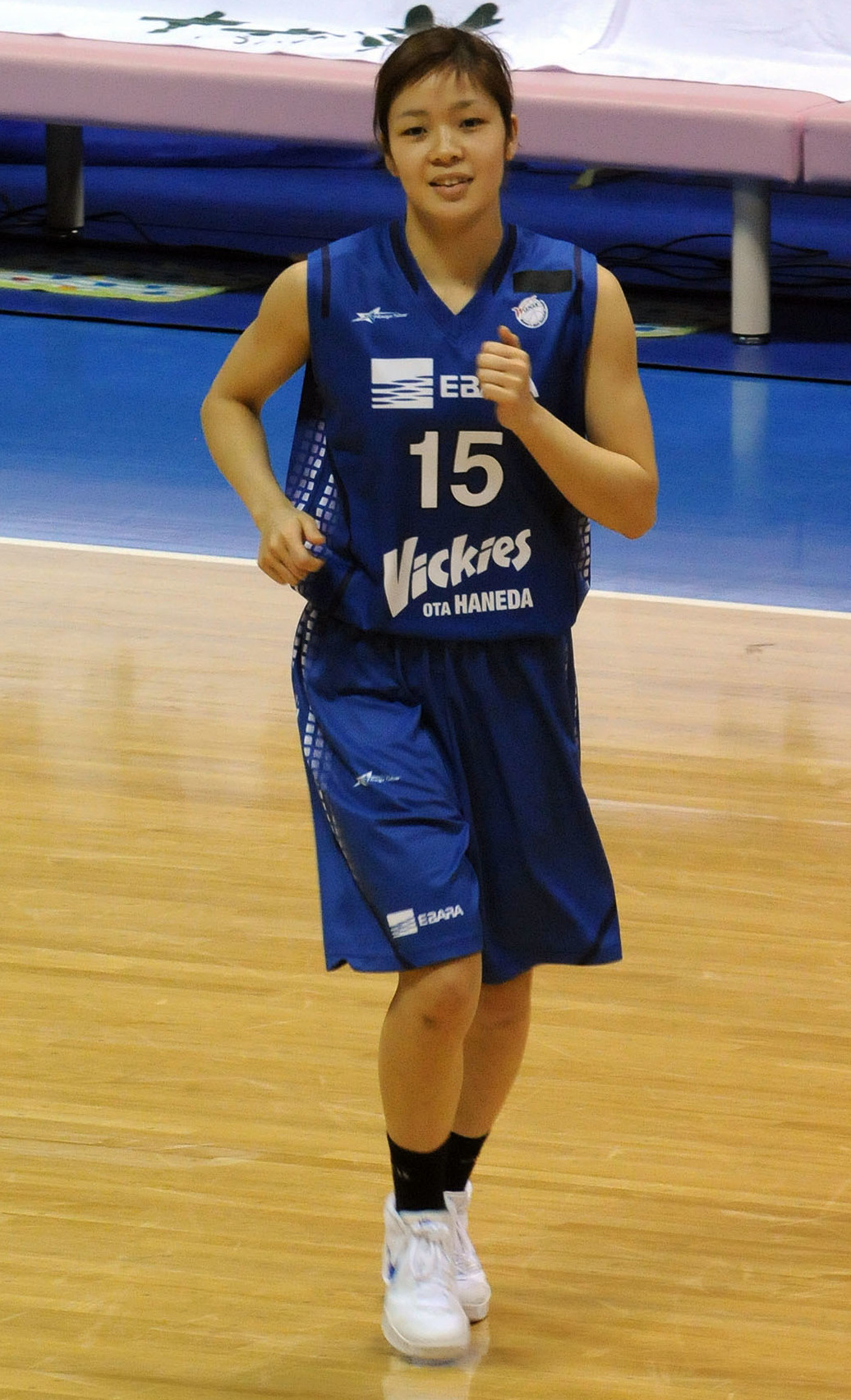
His wife, Satomi Shirahama

- He wears glasses off the court.
- The Nikkan Sports and Sports Hochi reported that Shirahama looks like stars, Haruma Miura and Dean Fujioka.
- He wanted to become a physiotherapist when he was in high school.
