= Kami Arena =

Arena in Izumo, Shimane, Japan

Coordinates: 35°23′2.3″N 132°42′23.6″E

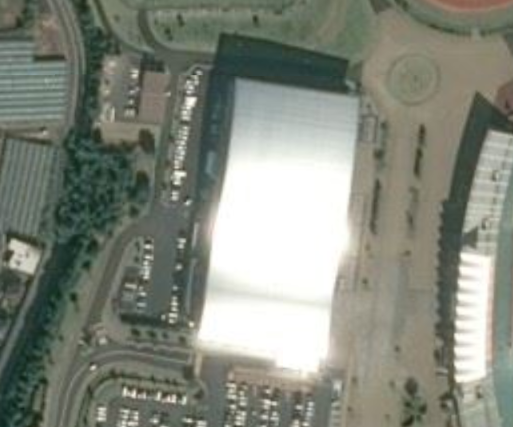
- Interactive map of Kami Arena
- Full name: Shimane Prefectural Hamayama Gymnasium
- Location: Izumo, Shimane, Japan
- Owner: Shimane Prefecture
- Operator: Shimane Prefecture
- Capacity: 2,840

Construction
- Cost

Website
- http://www.hamayamakoen.jp/taikukan.html

Kami Arena is an arena in Izumo, Shimane, Japan.
