= Ibaraki Robots =

Japanese professional basketball team in Mito, Ibaraki Prefecture

- Conference: East
- Division: First
- Leagues: B.League
- Founded: 2013
- History: Tsukuba Robots; 2013–2015; Cyberdyne Tsukuba Robots; 2015–2016; Cyberdyne Ibaraki Robots; 2016–2019; Ibaraki Robots; 2019–present
- Arena: Adastria Mito Arena
- Capacity: 5,000
- Location: Mito, Ibaraki
- Main sponsor: Adastria; Globis Corporation; K'S Holdings Corporation
- General manager: Daisuke Nishimura
- Head coach: Richard Glesmann
- Ownership: Yoshito Hori; Globis Corporation
- Website: www.ibarakirobots.win
Home	Away

The Ibaraki Robots (茨城ロボッツ, Ibaraki Robottsu) are a Japanese professional basketball team based in Mito, Ibaraki Prefecture. The team competes in the B.League Premier, the highest division of the B.League, as a member of the Eastern Conference. The team plays its home games at Adastria Mito Arena.

The team was originally based in Tsukuba, Ibaraki and were known as the Tsukuba Robots. The team's name originates from Tsukuba itself, which is well known for its scientific research laboratories and promotes itself as the "City of Robots."

== Roster ==
Ibaraki Robots roster
Players
Coaches

Pos.	No.	Nat.	Name	Ht.	Age
G	1	(Philippines)	Bobby Ray Parks Jr.	1.93 m (6 ft 4 in)	33 – 19 February 1993
G	2	(Japan)	Kohei Fukuzawa	1.77 m (5 ft 10 in)	33 – 2 April 1993
PG	3	(Japan)	Noboru Hasegawa (C)	1.75 m (5 ft 9 in)	29 – 21 December 1996
F	4	(United States)	Vic Law	2.01 m (6 ft 7 in)	30 – 19 December 1995
G	5	(Japan)	Genki Kojima	1.81 m (5 ft 11 in)	32 – 19 February 1994
F	7	(New Zealand)	Finn Delany	2.00 m (6 ft 7 in)	31 – 12 August 1995
SF	8	(Japan)	Hirotaka Yoshii	1.95 m (6 ft 5 in)	28 – 4 June 1998
G	10	(Japan)	Ru Jingaoka	1.88 m (6 ft 2 in)	23 – 1 February 2003
C	11	(Brazil)	Tim Soares	2.11 m (6 ft 11 in)	29 – 4 February 1997
G	12	(Japan)	Kento Akama	1.88 m (6 ft 2 in)	21 – 19 June 2005
G	13	(Japan)	Kohei Nakamura	1.81 m (5 ft 11 in)	30 – 16 September 1996
PG	14	(Japan)	Kotaro Hisaoka	1.80 m (5 ft 11 in)	29 – 4 January 1997
G/F	15	(Japan)	Reo Maeda	1.91 m (6 ft 3 in)	29 – 15 September 1997
F/C	18	(New Zealand)	Tohi Smith-Milner	2.05 m (6 ft 9 in)	31 – 6 October 1995
F/C	21	(United States)	Eric Jacobsen	2.08 m (6 ft 10 in)	32 – 2 June 1994
PG	25	(Japan)	Atsunobu Hirao	1.78 m (5 ft 10 in)	37 – 4 April 1989
PF	34	(Japan)	Hugh Watanabe	2.07 m (6 ft 9 in)	27 – 23 December 1998

Head coach

- (New Zealand) Paul Henare

Assistant coach(es)

- (Japan) Sho Higashijima

Legend

- (C) Team captain
- Injured

- Roster
Updated: October 22, 2026

== Season by season ==
Season	League	GP	W	L	%	Finish
2016–17	B2	60	32	28	(.533)	2
2017–18	B2	60	38	22	(.633)	2
2018–19	B2	60	35	25	(.583)	3
2019–20	B2	49	26	21	(.553)	3
2020–21	B2	57	41	16	(.719)	2
2021–22	B1	54	16	38	(.296)	10
2022–23	B1	60	23	37	(.383)	6
2023–24	B1	60	12	48	(.200)	8
2024–25	B1	56	13	43	(.232)	7

== Notable players ==
- Toarlyn Fitzpatrick
- Chukwudiebere Maduabum
- Yusuke Okada
- Juan Pattillo
- Justin Reynolds
- Rick Rickert
- Hirotaka Sato
- Logan Stutz
- Yuki Yamaguchi

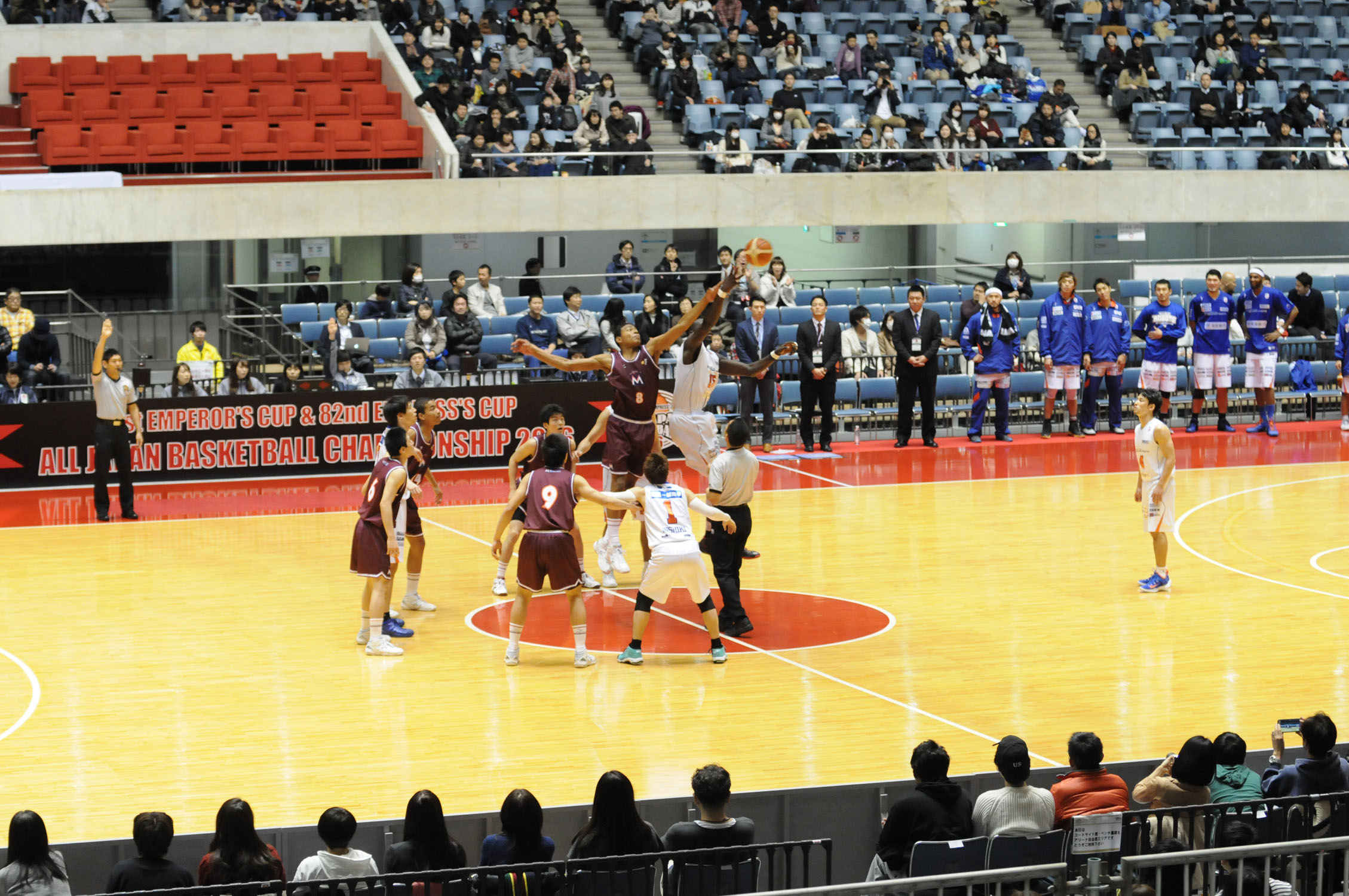
Robots

== Coaches ==
- Donte Hill
- Keita Iwashita
- Fujitaka Hiraoka
- Kenji Okamura
- Tony Garbelotto
- Richard Glesmann

== Arenas ==
- Adastria Mito Arena
- Lily Arena Mito
- Tsukuba Capio
- Hitachi City Ikenokawa Sakura Arena
- Kamisu Bousai Arena

== Practice facilities ==
They practice at the M-Spo Arena in Minamimachi 3chome, Mito. M-SpoFacebook
