= Nick Mayo =

American basketball player (born 1997)

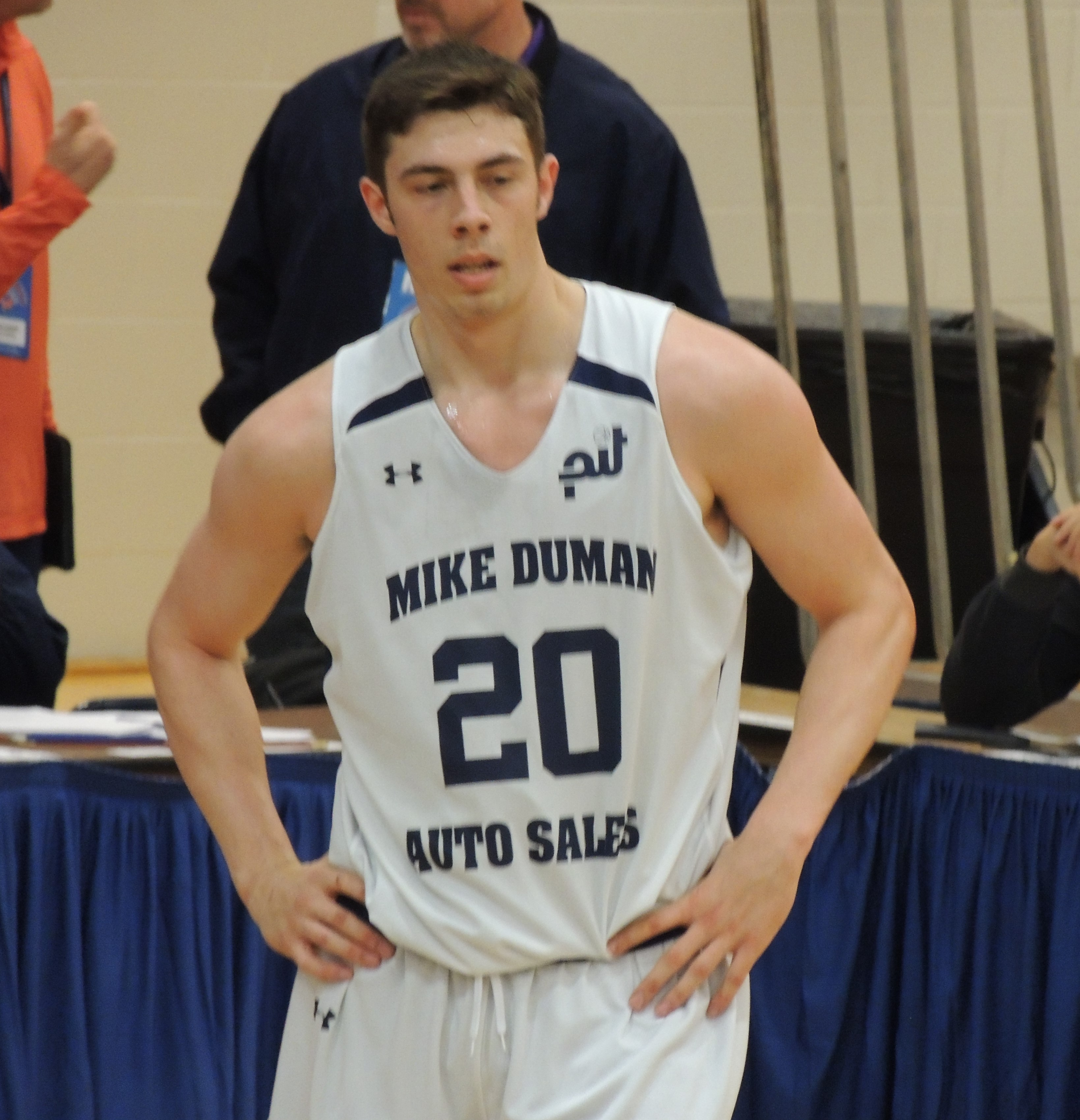
- Mayo at the 2019 PIT

No. 24 – Hiroshima Dragonflies
- Position: Power forward
- League: B.League

Personal information
- Born: August 18, 1997 (age 29)
- Listed height: 6 ft 9 in (2.06 m)
- Listed weight: 240 lb (109 kg)

Career information
- High school: Messalonskee (Oakland, Maine)
- College: Eastern Kentucky (2015–2019)
- NBA draft: 2019: undrafted
- Playing career: 2019–present

Career history
- 2019–2020: Chiba Jets Funabashi
- 2020–2021: Levanga Hokkaido
- 2021–present: Hiroshima Dragonflies

Career highlights
- B1 League champion (2024); 4× First-team All-OVC (2016–2019); OVC Freshman of the Year (2016)

Nicholas William Mayo (born August 18, 1997) is an American professional basketball player for Hiroshima Dragonflies of the B.League. He played college basketball for the Eastern Kentucky Colonels and left as the program's all-time leading scorer.

== High school career ==
Mayo grew up in Belgrade, Maine, and played basketball for Messalonskee High School in Oakland, Maine. As a senior, he averaged 24.4 points, 13.6 rebounds, 3.1 assists and three blocks per game, leading his team to the Eastern Maine Class A semifinals. Mayo was named Maine Gatorade Player of the Year and was a finalist for the Mr. Maine Basketball award.

== College career ==
Mayo was a four-year starter at Eastern Kentucky. He was named first-team All-Ohio Valley Conference (OVC) four times, joining Ralph Crosthwaite as the only players to ever achieve the feat. Mayo scored 2,316 career points, making him Eastern Kentucky's all-time leading scorer and ranking fifth in OVC history. He also became his school's all-time leader in blocks. As a senior, Mayo averaged 23.7 points, 8.7 rebounds, and 1.8 blocks per game, and led the OVC in free throw percentage (86.4%).

== Professional career ==
After going undrafted in the 2019 NBA draft, Mayo joined the Miami Heat for 2019 NBA Summer League. On July 19, 2019, he signed his first professional contract with Chiba Jets Funabashi of the Japanese B.League. In 19 games, he averaged 14.6 points and 5.6 rebounds per game. Mayo signed with Levanga Hokkaido of the B.League on June 29, 2020. He was named player of the week on November 17, after recording 37 points, six rebounds and three assists in a win against the Niigata Albirex BB.

On June 14, 2021, Mayo signed with Hiroshima Dragonflies. On May 20, 2022, he re-signed with Hiroshima Dragonflies. On May 24, 2023, he re- signed with Hiroshima Dragonflies. On June 6, 2024, he re- signed with Hiroshima Dragonflies.

== Career statistics ==
Legend
GP	Games played	GS	Games started	MPG	Minutes per game
FG%	Field goal percentage	3P%	3-point field goal percentage	FT%	Free throw percentage
RPG	Rebounds per game	APG	Assists per game	SPG	Steals per game
BPG	Blocks per game	PPG	Points per game	**Bold**	Career high

=== B.League ===
Year	Team	GP	GS	MPG	FG%	3P%	FT%	RPG	APG	SPG	BPG	PPG
2019–20	Chiba	19	6	24.4	.507	.333	.836	5.6	.9	1.1	.9	14.6
Career		19	6	24.4	.507	.333	.836	5.6	.9	1.1	.9	14.6

=== College ===
Year	Team	GP	GS	MPG	FG%	3P%	FT%	RPG	APG	SPG	BPG	PPG
2015–16	Eastern Kentucky	**31**	**31**	29.8	**.607**	**.556**	.802	4.9	1.1	.6	1.1	14.5
2016–17	Eastern Kentucky	**31**	**31**	**35.2**	.504	.390	.774	6.5	**2.8**	.9	1.4	18.5
2017–18	Eastern Kentucky	**31**	**31**	34.3	.526	.446	.839	6.7	2.2	.8	1.5	18.0
2018–19	Eastern Kentucky	**31**	30	34.8	.462	.331	**.864**	**8.7**	2.3	**1.2**	**1.8**	**23.7**
Career		124	123	33.5	.514	.387	.824	6.7	2.1	.9	1.4	18.7
