= Kashima General Gymnasium =

Arena in Japan

Coordinates: 35°31′39.9″N 132°59′12″E

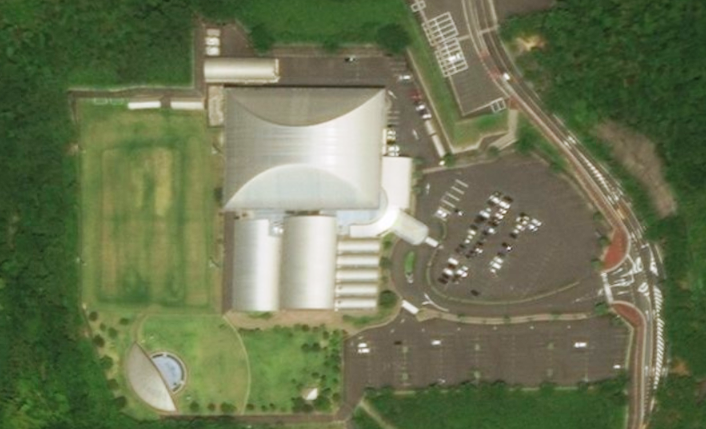
- Interactive map of Kashima General Gymnasium
- Full name: Kashima General Gymnasium
- Location: Matsue, Shimane, Japan
- Owner: Matsue city
- Operator: Matsue city
- Capacity: 2,000

Construction
- Cost

Website
- http://www.kashima-hall.com/index.html

Kashima General Gymnasium is an arena in Matsue, Shimane, Japan.
