= Hiroshima Dragonflies =

Professional basketball team in Hiroshima, Japan

- Conference: West
- Division: 1st
- Leagues: B.League; East Asia Super League
- Founded: 2013; 13 years ago
- History: Hiroshima Dragonflies (2014–present)
- Arena: Hiroshima Prefectural Sports Center
- Capacity: 6,052
- Location: Hiroshima Prefecture
- Team colors: Teal, Orange, Brown, White
- Head coach: Shogo Asayama
- Ownership: Nova Holdings
- Championships: 1 B.League (2024); 1 EASL (2025)
- Website: hiroshimadragonflies.com
Home	Away	3rd

The Hiroshima Dragonflies (Japanese: 広島ドラゴンフライズ, Hepburn: Hiroshima Doragonfuraizu) are a Japanese professional basketball team based in Hiroshima. The team competes in the B.League Premier, the highest division of the B.League, as a member of the Western Conference. The team plays its home games at Hiroshima Prefectural Sports Center called "Hiroshima Green Arena".

In October 2014 they commenced competing in the Western Conference of the Japanese National Basketball League. In September 2016 they joined the B.League, the NBL's successor league, and currently play in the first division's Western Conference. The Dragonflies have won the B.League championship once, in 2024. They also won the East Asia Super League (EASL) in 2025.

== History ==
=== Foundation ===
In April 2014, following the announcement that the former Japan Basketball League would be restructured as the National Basketball League, a group was launched to support the formation of a professional basketball team in Hiroshima. In May 2014 the group received support from the prefectural basketball association and an application to join the NBL was submitted in July. In August 2014 the application was approved and the name Hiroshima Dragonflies was decided. In October 2014 an operating company Hiroshima Dragonflies Corporation (株式会社広島ドラゴンフライズ) was established.

=== Championship (2024) ===
On May 29, 2024, the Dragonflies won their first-ever B1 League championship after they defeated the Ryukyu Golden Kings 2–1 in the finals.

The Dragonflies won the 2024–25 East Asia Super League.

== Team ==
=== Head coach ===
The inaugural head coach of the Dragonflies was Kenichi Sako, a former Japanese national player. It was the first coaching role for Sako, who was known as "Mr. Basketball" during his playing career that ended in 2011.

The team has not been able to retain a coach during the 2017–2018 season, and players have been filling in to the team's detriment.

- Kenichi Sako
- Jamie Andrisevic
- Shogo Asayama
- Shota Shakuno
- Takeshi Hotta
- Kyle Milling

=== Roster ===
Hiroshima Dragonflies roster
Players
Coaches

Pos.	No.	Nat.	Name	Ht.	Age
G	0	(Japan)	Ryo Terashima	1.75 m (5 ft 9 in)	29 – 23 October 1997
F/C	1	(Japan)	Masato Ichikawa	2.07 m (6 ft 9 in)	25 – 20 September 2001
G	3	(Japan)	Naoto Tsuji	1.85 m (6 ft 1 in)	37 – 8 August 1989
G	5	(United States) (Japan)	Isaiah Murphy	1.96 m (6 ft 5 in)	28 – 10 April 1998
F	7	(Japan)	Seiya Funyu	1.95 m (6 ft 5 in)	32 – 15 December 1993
F/C	8	(United States)	Kerry Blackshear Jr.	2.08 m (6 ft 10 in)	29 – 28 January 1997
G	10	(Japan)	Toshiki Kamisawa	1.76 m (5 ft 9 in)	28 – 2 June 1998
PG	12	(Japan)	Takuto Nakamura	1.84 m (6 ft 0 in)	25 – 3 March 2001
F	23	(Japan)	Ryo Sadohara	1.92 m (6 ft 4 in)	27 – 24 October 1999
F/C	24	(United States)	Nick Mayo	2.06 m (6 ft 9 in)	29 – 18 August 1997
G	30	(Japan)	Ryo Yamazaki	1.82 m (6 ft 0 in)	26 – 25 September 2000
G/F	34	(Japan)	Keijiro Mitani	1.91 m (6 ft 3 in)	25 – 15 June 2001

Head coach

Shogo Asayama

Assistant coach(es)

Shoyo Kato
Ryoichi Nishitani
Jay Sakamato

Legend

- (C) Team captain
- Injured

- Roster
Updated: October 2, 2024

== Arenas ==
- Hiroshima Prefectural Sports Center (2026 - )
- Hiroshima Sun Plaza ( - 2026)
- Fukuyama Rose Arena
- Shishin-yo Oak Arena
- Higashihiroshima Sports Park Gymnasium
- Maeda Housing Higashiku Sports Center

== Notable players ==
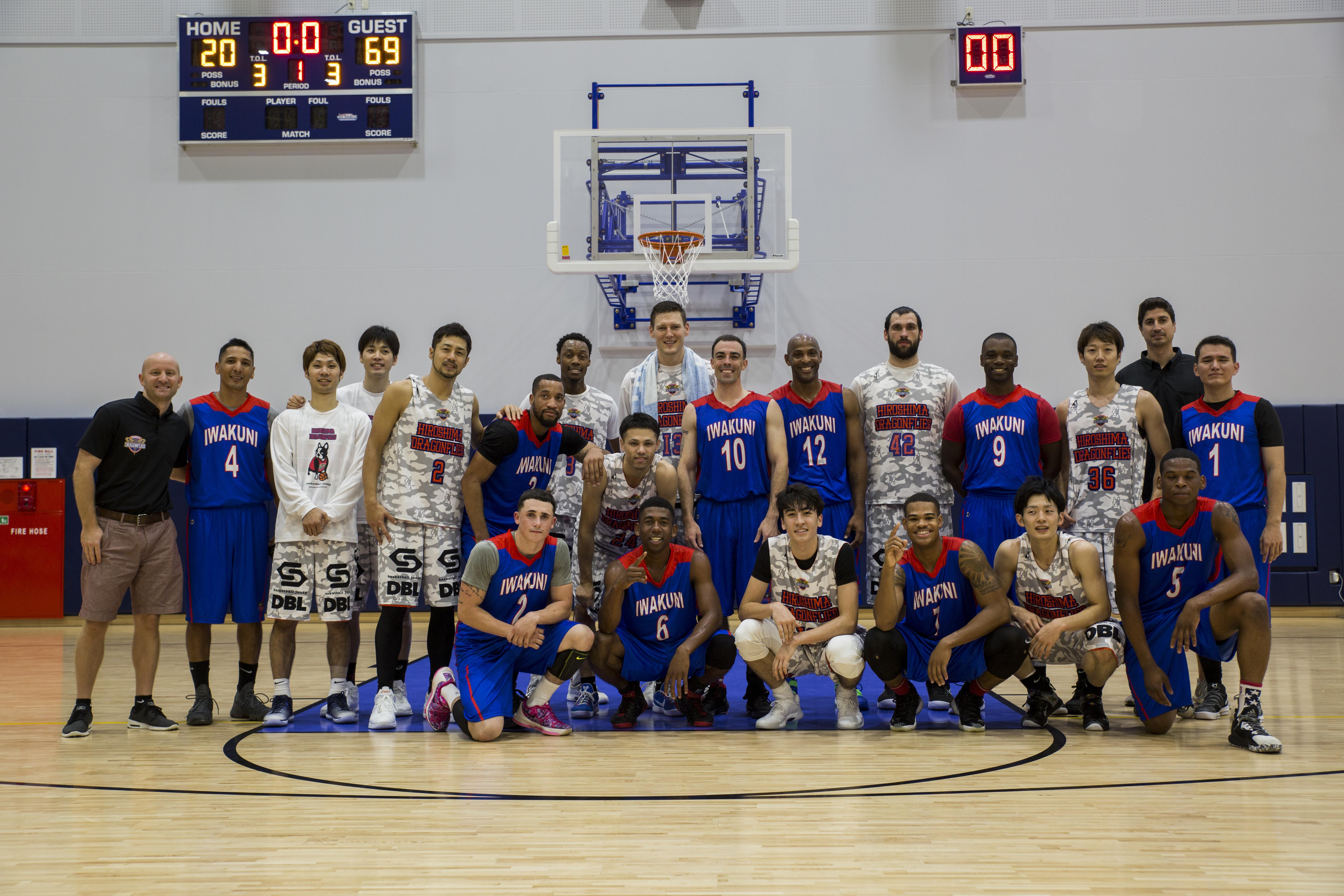
Dragonflies in 2017

- Clint Chapman
- Daniel Dillon
- Yusuke Okada
- Shannon Shorter
- Kosuke Takeuchi
- Wendell White
- Daiji Yamada
- Kai Sotto
