= Nagoya Diamond Dolphins =

Professional basketball team in Nagoya, Aichi Prefecture, Japan

- Conference: West
- Division: First
- Leagues: B.League
- Founded: 1950; 76 years ago
- Arena: IG Arena
- Capacity: 7,407
- Location: Nagoya, Aichi Prefecture
- Team colors: Red
- Main sponsor: Mitsubishi
- President: Yuki Yamashita
- Head coach: Roy Rana
- Ownership: Nagoya Diamond Dolphins Co., Ltd. (Mitsubishi Electric)
- Championships: 0
- Conference titles: 0
- Website: nagoya-dolphins.jp
Home	Away

The Nagoya Diamond Dolphins (名古屋ダイヤモンドドルフィンズ, Nagoya Daiyamondo Dorufinzu) are a professional basketball team based in Nagoya. The team competes in the B.League Premier, the highest division of the B.League, as a member of the Western Conference. The team plays its home games at IG Arena. Prior to their entry into the B.League in September 2016, the club was the corporate team of Mitsubishi Electric.

In 2020, the Diamond Dolphins became the first top-tier professional Japanese sports club to sign on to the "Sport for Climate Action Framework" led by the United Nations Framework Convention on Climate Change.

== History ==
The club was formed in 1950 at Mitsubishi Electric's Nagoya factory and entered the second division of Japan's top league in 1973. The club's women's team had previously entered the women's competition of the national corporate basketball league (全国実業団バスケットボールリーグ) upon the league's formation in 1967. Now known as the Mitsubishi Electric Koalas, they continue to compete in the Women's Japan Basketball League.

The men's team was promoted to the first division after winning the second division title in 1984. They finished runners-up in the first division on four occasions, in 1986, 1987, 1989 and 2006. They won the All-Japan Basketball Emperor's Cup in 1989 and 1990.

== Previous names ==
The team has undergone several name changes during its history:

- 1950-2000: Mitsubishi Electric Nagoya
- 2000-2007: Melco Dolphins
- 2007-2013: Mitsubishi Electric Diamond Dolphins
- 2013-2016: Mitsubishi Electric Diamond Dolphins Nagoya

== Current roster ==
Nagoya Diamond Dolphins roster
Players
Coaches

Pos.	No.	Nat.	Name	Ht.	Age
PG	2	(Japan)	Takumi Saito	1.72 m (5 ft 8 in)	31 – 11 August 1995
PG	3	(Japan)	Taketo Kato	1.78 m (5 ft 10 in)	26 – 15 January 2000
SF	4	(Japan)	Hiyuu Ozawa	1.90 m (6 ft 3 in)	22 – 4 October 2004
SG	5	(Japan)	Shinsaku Enomoto	1.96 m (6 ft 5 in)	28 – 10 April 1998
PG	7	(Japan)	Yuto Imanishi	1.80 m (5 ft 11 in)	20 – 16 May 2006
SF	8	(Japan)	Tenketsu Harimoto	1.98 m (6 ft 6 in)	34 – 8 January 1992
F/C	11	(United States)	Ryan Luther	2.06 m (6 ft 9 in)	31 – 10 September 1995
SG	12	(Japan)	Taito Nakahigashi	1.91 m (6 ft 3 in)	34 – 18 June 1992
G/F	14	(Japan)	Takuma Sato	1.97 m (6 ft 6 in)	31 – 10 May 1995
C	15	(United States)	Alan Williams	2.03 m (6 ft 8 in)	33 – 28 January 1993
G	17	(Japan)	Eita Wakano	1.86 m (6 ft 1 in)	19 – 13 June 2007
G	21	(Japan)	Makoto Kamata	1.93 m (6 ft 4 in)	26 – 19 September 2000
SF	23	(Japan)	Jake Koki Holtz	1.93 m (6 ft 4 in)	24 – 3 January 2002
SG	27	(Japan)	Yuito Haruta	1.66 m (5 ft 5 in)	18 – 13 November 2007
G/F	30	(Japan)	Keita Imamura	1.91 m (6 ft 3 in)	30 – 25 January 1996
F/C	43	(United States)	Scott Eatherton	2.08 m (6 ft 10 in)	34 – 26 December 1991
SF	50	(United States)	Aaron Henry	1.98 m (6 ft 6 in)	27 – 30 August 1999

Head coach

- (Canada) Roy Rana

Assistant coach(es)

- (Japan) Hirohisa Takada

Legend

- (C) Team captain
- Injured

- Roster
Updated: 2026 October 1

Note: Flags indicate national team eligibility at FIBA-sanctioned events. Players may hold other non-FIBA nationalities not displayed.

== Coaches ==
- Masato Fukushima
- Masahiro Fujita
- Antonio Lang (2010–14)
- Trifon Poch Lopez (2014–15)
- Reggie Geary (2015-2017)
- Shingo Kajiyama
- Hirohisa Takada (asst)

== Notable players ==
To appear in this section a player must have either:

- Set a club record or won an individual award as a professional player.
- Played at least one official international match for his senior national team at any time.

- (United States) Hilton Armstrong
- (Canada) Jordan Bachynski
- (United States) Craig Brackins
- (United States) Eric Dawson (2009-2010)
- (United States) Heshimu Evans
- (United States) Anthony Frederick
- (Japan) Satoru Furuta
- (Japan) Tenketsu Harimoto
- (United States) Jerald Honeycutt (2006-2008)
- (Japan) Kei Igarashi
- (Japan) Takumi Ishizaki
- (Japan) Reina Itakura
- (Japan) Shunsuke Itō
- (United States) Alex Jensen
- (Japan) Shinsuke Kashiwagi
- (United States) Tom Kleinschmidt
- (United States) Brendan Lane
- (France) Amath M'Baye
- (Senegal) Maurice Ndour
- (Mexico) Adam Parada
- (United States) Anthony Reed
- (The Bahamas) Magnum Rolle
- (Japan) Hirotaka Sato
- (United States) Matt Steigenga
- (United States) Johnny Taylor
- (United States) Stephen Thompson
- (United States) Jerome Tillman
- (Japan) Hiroyuki Tominaga
- (United States) David Weaver

== Arenas ==
- Dolphins Arena
- Park Arena Komaki
- IG Arena
