= 2025–26 East Asia Super League =

Third regular season of the East Asia Super League

East Asia Super League
- Season: 2025–26
- Duration: 8 October 2025 – 22 March 2026
- Teams: 12

Finals
- Champions: (Japan) Utsunomiya Brex (1st title)
- Runners-up: (Chinese Taipei) Taoyuan Pauian Pilots
- Third place: (Japan) Ryukyu Golden Kings
- Fourth place: (Japan) Alvark Tokyo
- Finals MVP: (Japan) Makoto Hiejima (Utsunomiya Brex)

Seasons
- ← 2024–25 2026–27 →

The 2025–26 East Asia Super League was the third regular season of the East Asia Super League, an international basketball club competition involving teams from Hong Kong, Japan, Macau, Mongolia, South Korea, Philippines and Taiwan. The season began on 8 October 2025 and ended on 22 March 2026.

The Utsunomiya Brex won their first title after defeating the Taoyuan Pauian Pilots in the final.

== Teams ==
=== Allocation ===
The 2025–26 East Asia Super League featured twelve teams, up from ten in the previous season.

Taiwan's (Chinese Taipei) P. League+ (PLG), Japan's B.League and South Korea's Korean Basketball League (KBL) each have two slots allocated for the finalists of their respective leagues. On 13 May 2025, a third slot was given to the B.League, allocated for the champion of the Emperor's Cup. On 24 July, the EASL also gave Chinese Taipei a third slot, which was given to the New Taipei Kings, champions of the Taiwan Professional Basketball League (TPBL).

The Philippines' Philippine Basketball Association (PBA) was allocated one slot, down from two in previous seasons. This is due to the PBA assessment that sending two teams would be difficult considering its busy schedule for the 2025–26 season. The allocation process for the lone Philippine representative was to be confirmed since the PBA has multiple conferences or tournaments for its 2024–25 season. Champions TNT Tropang Giga and San Miguel Beermen opted out from participating. On 30 July, the PBA announced that the Meralco Bolts would be the representative for the Philippines, a decision determined through a vote.

On 24 January 2025, the EASL announced that Mongolia's The League would be represented in the league for the first time. The League was given one slot for the league champions.

Continuing from the previous season, Macau and Hong Kong would each have one team joining the EASL. Hong Kong Eastern in particular are contracted to participate regardless of placing in the domestic league. The Macau Black Bears would also return.

League	Country or region	Berths
B.League	Japan	3
P. League+	Chinese Taipei (Note: Taiwan, officially Republic of China. The organizers of the EASL and FIBA uses the designation of "Chinese Taipei".)	2
Korean Basketball League	South Korea	2
The League	Mongolia	1
Philippine Basketball Association	Philippines	1
Others	Chinese Taipei	1
Others	Hong Kong	1
Others	Macau	1

==== Qualified teams ====
Team	Domestic league standing
(Chinese Taipei) Taoyuan Pauian Pilots	2024–25 P. League+ champion
(Chinese Taipei) Taipei Fubon Braves	2024–25 P. League+ runner-up
(Chinese Taipei) New Taipei Kings	2024–25 Taiwan Professional Basketball League champion
(Japan) Utsunomiya Brex	2024–25 B.League champion
(Japan) Ryukyu Golden Kings	2024–25 B.League runner-up
(Japan) Alvark Tokyo	2025 Emperor’s Cup runner-up (Note: As the 2025 Emperor's Cup champion Ryukyu Golden Kings qualified by reaching the 2025 B.League Finals, the slot reserved for the Emperor's Cup champion was transferred to the Emperor's Cup runner-up.)
(South Korea) Changwon LG Sakers	2024–25 Korean Basketball League champion
(South Korea) Seoul SK Knights	2024–25 Korean Basketball League runner-up
(Mongolia) Ulaanbaatar Xac Broncos	2024–25 The League champion
(Philippines) Meralco Bolts	2025 PBA Philippine Cup quarterfinalists (Note: The champions of the 2024–25 PBA season, TNT Tropang Giga (2024 Governors' Cup and 2024–25 Commissioner's Cup) and the San Miguel Beermen (2025 Philippine Cup) opted out. Instead the Meralco Bolts was voted to represent the PBA in the EASL.)
Hong Kong Eastern	2024–25 Hong Kong A1 Division Championship fourth place
Macau Black Bears	

=== Foreign and heritage players ===
The EASL allows a maximum of two foreign players or imports. Additionally teams are allowed to have one additional heritage and naturalized player.

Club	Imports		Asian heritage player	Naturalized player	Former players
(Chinese Taipei) Taoyuan Pauian Pilots			—N/a	(United States) Will Artino	—N/a
(Chinese Taipei) Taipei Fubon Braves			(Iran) Aaron Geramipoor	—N/a	(United States) Bennie Boatwright (United States) Troy Gillenwater
(Chinese Taipei) New Taipei Kings			(Iran) Sina Vahedi	(Taiwan) Quincy Davis	(Palestine) Sani Sakakini
(Japan) Utsunomiya Brex			—N/a	(United States) Gavin Edwards	—N/a
(Japan) Ryukyu Golden Kings			—N/a	(United States) Alex Kirk	—N/a
(Japan) Alvark Tokyo			(China) Michael Ou	(United States) Ryan Rossiter	(United States) Ira Brown (United States) Stephen Zack
(South Korea) Changwon LG Sakers	(Egypt) Assem Marei	(Nigeria) Micheal Eric	(Philippines) Carl Tamayo	—N/a	—N/a
(South Korea) Seoul SK Knights	(United States) Jameel Warney	(United States) Darryl Monroe	(Philippines) Arvin Tolentino	—N/a	—N/a
(Mongolia) Ulaanbaatar Xac Broncos	(United States) Ian Miller	(Canada) Jordy Tshimanga	(Thailand) Freddie Lish	—N/a	(Japan) Wataru Igari (United States) Efe Odigie
(Philippines) Meralco Bolts	(Cuba) Ismael Romero	(Haiti) Cady Lalanne	—N/a	(United States) Justin Brownlee	(United States) Rondae Hollis-Jefferson (Senegal) Ange Kouame (Iran) Sina Vahedi
Hong Kong Eastern	(France) Alexandre Gavrilovic	(United States) Cameron Clark	(Palestine) Jamal Mayali	—N/a	(United States) Ryan Watkins
Macau Black Bears	(Malta) Samuel Deguara	(United States) Torrence Watson	—N/a	—N/a	(United States) JD Miller

== Group stage ==
The twelve teams were drawn into three groups of four teams each for the group stage. The top two teams from each group advanced to postseason. The top two overall seeds received a bye.

=== Group A ===
Pos	Team	Pld	W	L	PF	PA	PD	PCT	Qualification
1	(Japan) Utsunomiya Brex	6	4	2	559	530	+29	.667 (Note: Utsunomiya Brex 175–173 Seoul SK Knights)	Advance to finals
2	(South Korea) Seoul SK Knights	6	4	2	527	515	+12	.667	Advance to finals
3	(Chinese Taipei) Taipei Fubon Braves	6	2	4	542	573	−31	.333 (Note: Taipei Fubon Braves 188–184 Hong Kong Eastern)	
4	Hong Kong Eastern	6	2	4	527	537	−10	.333	

Source: EASL
Notes:

8 October 2025	Taipei Fubon Braves (Chinese Taipei)	109–107(OT)	(Japan) Utsunomiya Brex	Taipei City
18:40 (TST)	Scoring by quarter: 21–22, 30–24, 22–29, 22–20, Overtime: 14–12
	Pts: Goodwin 43; Rebs: Mbaye 6 Asts: Goodwin 6	Boxscore	Pts: Newbill 32; Rebs: Fotu 12; Asts: Newbill 10	Arena: Taipei Heping Basketball Gymnasium

22 October 2025	Utsunomiya Brex (Japan)	97–89	(South Korea) Seoul SK Knights	Utsunomiya
19:10 (JST)	Scoring by quarter: 31–24, 23–12, 21–26, 22–27
	Pts: Fotu 30; Rebs: Takeuchi 10; Asts: Fotu 6	Boxscore	Pts: Tolentino 29; Rebs: Warney 11; Asts: Monroe 9	Arena: Brex Arena Utsunomiya

12 November 2025	Seoul SK Knights (South Korea)	94–87	Hong Kong Eastern	Seoul
19:10 (KST)	Scoring by quarter: 25–27, 28–12, 23–26, 18–22
	Pts: Warney 34; Rebs: Warney 7 Asts: Warney 6	Boxscore	Pts: Gilbert 23; Rebs: Gavrilovic 13; Asts: Blankley 6	Arena: Jamsil Students' Gymnasium

13 December 2025	Taipei Fubon Braves (Chinese Taipei)	95–81	Hong Kong Eastern	Taipei City
17:10 (TST)	Scoring by quarter: 24–28, 21–16, 30–20, 20–17
	Pts: Goodwin, Gillenwater 26; Rebs: Mbaye, Gillenwater 9 Asts: Chou 3	Boxscore	Pts: Gilbert 23; Rebs: Gavrilovic 15; Asts: Chan S. 4	Arena: Taipei Heping Basketball Gymnasium

17 December 2025	Seoul SK Knights (South Korea)	84–78	(Japan) Utsunomiya Brex	Seoul
19:10 (KST)	Scoring by quarter: 21–16, 25–14, 18–20, 20–28
	Pts: Warney 22; Rebs: Monroe 14; Asts: Kim N., Warney 4	Boxscore	Pts: Fotu 27; Rebs: Fotu 9 Asts: Newbill 7	Arena: Jamsil Students' Gymnasium

24 December 2025	Taipei Fubon Braves (Chinese Taipei)	79–88	(South Korea) Seoul SK Knights	Taipei City
19:40 (TST)	Scoring by quarter: 25–20, 21–14, 15–32, 18–22
	Pts: Goodwin 26; Rebs: Geramipoor 8 Asts: Goodwin 5	Boxscore	Pts: Warney 25; Rebs: Monroe 13; Asts: Oh J. 5	Arena: Taipei Heping Basketball Gymnasium

28 December 2025	Hong Kong Eastern	103–93	(Chinese Taipei) Taipei Fubon Braves	Hong Kong
20:10 (HKT)	Scoring by quarter: 31–26, 28–25, 28–19, 16–23
	Pts: Clark 24; Rebs: Gilbert 9 Asts: G. Yang 9	Boxscore	Pts: Gillenwater 26; Rebs: Gillenwater 7 Asts: Chou 8	Arena: Southorn Stadium

7 January 2026	Hong Kong Eastern	96–83(OT)	(South Korea) Seoul SK Knights	Hong Kong
20:10 (HKT)	Scoring by quarter: 20–17, 20–27, 18–15, 23–22, Overtime: 15–2
	Pts: Clark, Gilbert 27; Rebs: Gilbert 12; Asts: G. Yang 7	Boxscore	Pts: Warney 29; Rebs: Monroe 14; Asts: Warney, Monroe 4	Arena: Southorn Stadium

21 January 2026	Utsunomiya Brex (Japan)	83–74	Hong Kong Eastern	Utsunomiya
19:10 (JST)	Scoring by quarter: 28–20, 25–22, 18–15, 12–17
	Pts: Newbill 23; Rebs: three players 8 Asts: Newbill 10	Boxscore	Pts: Gavrilovic 20; Rebs: Gavrilovic 11; Asts: three players 4	Arena: Brex Arena Utsunomiya; Attendance: 3,969

28 January 2026	Seoul SK Knights (South Korea)	89–78	(Chinese Taipei) Taipei Fubon Braves	Seoul
19:10 (KST)	Scoring by quarter: 31–19, 26–27, 10–20, 22–12
	Pts: Warney 24; Rebs: Monroe 18; Asts: Monroe 6	Boxscore	Pts: Goodwin 35; Rebs: Geramipoor 7 Asts: Goodwin 5	Arena: Jamsil Students' Gymnasium

4 February 2026	Hong Kong Eastern	86–89	(Japan) Utsunomiya Brex	Hong Kong
20:10 (HKT)	Scoring by quarter: 18–26, 15–21, 27–23, 26–19
	Pts: Gilbert 21; Rebs: Gavrilovic 12; Asts: Chong Qui 6	Boxscore	Pts: Jerrett 26; Rebs: Edwards 10; Asts: Newbill 5	Arena: Southorn Stadium

11 February 2026	Utsunomiya Brex (Japan)	105–88	(Chinese Taipei) Taipei Fubon Braves	Utsunomiya
19:10 (JST)	Scoring by quarter: 31–21, 23–26, 29–21, 22–20
	Pts: Newbill 27; Rebs: Jerrett 10; Asts: Jerrett 8	Boxscore	Pts: Goodwin 23; Rebs: Geramipoor 10; Asts: Goodwin 5	Arena: Brex Arena Utsunomiya; Attendance: 4,169

=== Group B ===
Pos	Team	Pld	W	L	PF	PA	PD	PCT	Qualification
1	(Japan) Ryukyu Golden Kings	6	5	1	526	487	+39	.833	Advance to finals
2	(Chinese Taipei) Taoyuan Pauian Pilots	6	4	2	533	494	+39	.667	Advance to finals
3	(Philippines) Meralco Bolts	6	3	3	493	492	+1	.500	
4	Macau Black Bears	6	0	6	494	573	−79	.000	

Source: EASL

8 October 2025	Taoyuan Pauian Pilots (Chinese Taipei)	94–80	(Japan) Ryukyu Golden Kings	Taipei City
20:40 (TST)	Scoring by quarter: 25–25, 24–20, 27–15, 18–20
	Pts: Lu 24; Rebs: Artino 12; Asts: Pai 6	Boxscore	Pts: Law 29; Rebs: Cooley 14; Asts: Kishimoto 3	Arena: Taipei Heping Basketball Gymnasium

22 October 2025	Ryukyu Golden Kings (Japan)	81–72	(Philippines) Meralco Bolts	Okinawa
19:05 (JST)	Scoring by quarter: 14–18, 23–18, 22–20, 22–16
	Pts: Kishimoto 22; Rebs: Cooley 19; Asts: Kishimoto 8	Boxscore	Pts: Hollis-Jefferson 25; Rebs: Romero 11; Asts: Hollis-Jefferson, Newsome 5	Arena: Okinawa Suntory Arena

2 November 2025	Taoyuan Pauian Pilots (Chinese Taipei)	82–72	(Philippines) Meralco Bolts	Taoyuan City
17:10 (TST)	Scoring by quarter: 21–16, 22–14, 21–17, 18–25
	Pts: Artino 20; Rebs: Artino 17; Asts: three players 3	Boxscore	Pts: Romero 26; Rebs: Romero 17; Asts: Hollis-Jefferson 4	Arena: Taoyuan Arena

8 November 2025	Meralco Bolts (Philippines)	85–76	(Chinese Taipei) Taoyuan Pauian Pilots	Ilagan
18:10 (PST)	Scoring by quarter: 23–14, 20–16, 23–20, 19–26
	Pts: Vahedi, Romero 22; Rebs: Romero 14; Asts: Vahedi, Hollis-Jefferson 7	Boxscore	Pts: Millner 19; Rebs: Artino 11; Asts: Brown 4	Arena: The Capital Arena

15 November 2025	Meralco Bolts (Philippines)	92–74	Macau Black Bears	Cebu City
18:10 (PST)	Scoring by quarter: 25–24, 23–14, 17–14, 27–22
	Pts: Hollis-Jefferson 34; Rebs: Romero 28; Asts: Hollis-Jefferson 5	Boxscore	Pts: Chong Qui 25; Rebs: Miller 10; Asts: Chong Qui 4	Arena: Cebu Coliseum

6 December 2025	Macau Black Bears	91–93	(Philippines) Meralco Bolts	Ilagan
18:10 (PST)	Scoring by quarter: 27–29, 17–22, 19–20, 28–22
	Pts: Peek-Green 26; Rebs: Deguara 13; Asts: Chong Qui 9	Boxscore	Pts: Romero 24; Rebs: Romero 17; Asts: Newsome 10	Arena: The Capital Arena

14 December 2025	Taoyuan Pauian Pilots (Chinese Taipei)	104–86	Macau Black Bears	Taoyuan City
17:10 (TST)	Scoring by quarter: 17–40, 28–25, 29–10, 30–11
	Pts: Brown 27; Rebs: Dieng 14; Asts: Lu 6	Boxscore	Pts: Chong Qui 25; Rebs: Deguara 11; Asts: Chong Qui 7	Arena: Taoyuan Arena

17 December 2025	Ryukyu Golden Kings (Japan)	87–81	Macau Black Bears	Okinawa
19:40 (JST)	Scoring by quarter: 21–24, 20–19, 22–16, 24–22
	Pts: Sadohara 19; Rebs: Cooley 11; Asts: Waki, Kirk 5	Boxscore	Pts: Chong Qui 25; Rebs: Peek-Green, Deguara 8 Asts: Chong Qui 7	Arena: Okinawa Suntory Arena; Attendance: 7,788

4 January 2026	Macau Black Bears	83–95	(Chinese Taipei) Taoyuan Pauian Pilots	Quanzhou
15:10 (CST)	Scoring by quarter: 21–24, 15–17, 21–22, 26–32
	Pts: Peek-Green 25; Rebs: Shackelford 9 Asts: Chong Qui, Shackelford 4	Boxscore	Pts: Brown 35; Rebs: Brown 13; Asts: Pai, Chen C. 7	Arena: Huaqiao University Lin Shuzhen Gymnasium

21 January 2026	Macau Black Bears	79–102	(Japan) Ryukyu Golden Kings	Manila
19:40 (PST)	Scoring by quarter: 17–20, 21–29, 16–26, 25–27
	Pts: Ye 23; Rebs: four players 4 Asts: Wang 4	Boxscore	Pts: Cooley, Kirk 25; Rebs: Cooley 9 Asts: Kishimoto 6	Arena: Ninoy Aquino Stadium

4 February 2026	Ryukyu Golden Kings (Japan)	88–82	(Chinese Taipei) Taoyuan Pauian Pilots	Okinawa
19:40 (JST)	Scoring by quarter: 21–27, 25–22, 25–22, 17–11
	Pts: Cooley 16; Rebs: Cooley 8 Asts: Dotson, Kishimoto 5	Boxscore	Pts: Lu 32; Rebs: Brown 10; Asts: Graham, Li 3	Arena: Okinawa Suntory Arena; Attendance: 8,016

11 February 2026	Meralco Bolts (Philippines)	79–88	(Japan) Ryukyu Golden Kings	Quezon City
19:40 (PST)	Scoring by quarter: 16–26, 20–25, 22–23, 21–14
	Pts: Romero 24; Rebs: Romero 9 Asts: Brownlee 6	Boxscore	Pts: Matsuwaki 18; Rebs: Cooley 11; Asts: Law, Kishimoto 4	Arena: Smart Araneta Coliseum

=== Group C ===
Pos	Team	Pld	W	L	PF	PA	PD	PCT	Qualification
1	(Japan) Alvark Tokyo	6	5	1	545	499	+46	.833	Advance to finals
2	(Chinese Taipei) New Taipei Kings	6	3	3	536	548	−12	.500 (Note: New Taipei Kings 185–184 Ulaanbaatar Xac Broncos)	Advance to finals
3	(Mongolia) Ulaanbaatar Xac Broncos	6	3	3	549	526	+23	.500	
4	(South Korea) Changwon LG Sakers	6	1	5	494	551	−57	.167	

Source: EASL
Notes:

8 October 2025	Alvark Tokyo (Japan)	69–84	(Mongolia) Ulaanbaatar Xac Broncos	Chōfu
19:10 (JST)	Scoring by quarter: 25–28, 24–18, 10–16, 10–22
	Pts: Foster 20; Rebs: Zack 9 Asts: Baranski 4	Boxscore	Pts: Odigie 25; Rebs: Odigie 11; Asts: Miller 6	Arena: Keio Arena Tokyo

22 October 2025	New Taipei Kings (Chinese Taipei)	89–107	(Japan) Alvark Tokyo	New Taipei City
19:10 (TST)	Scoring by quarter: 23–30, 17–25, 26–31, 23–21
	Pts: Gardner 29; Rebs: Gardner 7 Asts: Lin Y. 5	Boxscore	Pts: Saiz 25; Rebs: Rossiter 11; Asts: Toews, Rossiter 6	Arena: Xinzhuang Gymnasium; Attendance: 3,280

30 October 2025	Changwon LG Sakers (South Korea)	78–90	(Chinese Taipei) New Taipei Kings	Changwon
19:10 (KST)	Scoring by quarter: 17–31, 26–12, 22–27, 13–20
	Pts: Marei, Yang J. 16; Rebs: Marei 14; Asts: Yang J. 10	Boxscore	Pts: Sakakini 33; Rebs: Gardner 10; Asts: Daye 8	Arena: Changwon Gymnasium

1 November 2025	Ulaanbaatar Xac Broncos (Mongolia)	90–76	(Chinese Taipei) New Taipei Kings	Ulaanbaatar
17:10 (ULAT)	Scoring by quarter: 35–18, 17–20, 12–14, 26–24
	Pts: Miller 40; Rebs: Odigie 21; Asts: Barsbold 5	Boxscore	Pts: Sakakini 24; Rebs: Gardner 16; Asts: Gardner 5	Arena: M bank Arena

5 November 2025	Ulaanbaatar Xac Broncos (Mongolia)	105–77	(South Korea) Changwon LG Sakers	Ulaanbaatar
19:10 (ULAT)	Scoring by quarter: 30–25, 23–17, 26–22, 26–13
	Pts: Odigie 32; Rebs: Azbayar 10; Asts: Azbayar 6	Boxscore	Pts: Eric 16; Rebs: Eric 5 Asts: Yang J. 8	Arena: M bank Arena

19 November 2025	New Taipei Kings (Chinese Taipei)	93–87	(South Korea) Changwon LG Sakers	New Taipei City
19:10 (TST)	Scoring by quarter: 24–22, 23–21, 25–28, 21–16
	Pts: Sakakini 25; Rebs: Sakakini 9 Asts: Lee 9	Boxscore	Pts: Eric 21; Rebs: Marei 16; Asts: Marei 7	Arena: Xinzhuang Gymnasium; Attendance: 2,908

6 December 2025	New Taipei Kings (Chinese Taipei)	109–94	(Mongolia) Ulaanbaatar Xac Broncos	New Taipei City
17:10 (TST)	Scoring by quarter: 34–29, 27–16, 23–16, 25–33
	Pts: Harris 35; Rebs: Washburn 10; Asts: J. Lin, Su S. 4	Boxscore	Pts: Odigie 29; Rebs: Odigie 18; Asts: Miller 10	Arena: Xinzhuang Gymnasium; Attendance: 3,394

9 December 2025	Changwon LG Sakers (South Korea)	98–83	(Mongolia) Ulaanbaatar Xac Broncos	Changwon
19:10 (KST)	Scoring by quarter: 22–14, 27–27, 21–14, 28–28
	Pts: Marei, Yang H. 21; Rebs: Marei 10; Asts: Marei 11	Boxscore	Pts: Bilguun 31; Rebs: Azbayar 5 Asts: Barsbold 3	Arena: Changwon Gymnasium

17 December 2025	Alvark Tokyo (Japan)	92–73	(South Korea) Changwon LG Sakers	Tachikawa
19:10 (JST)	Scoring by quarter: 17–17, 22–18, 23–17, 30–21
	Pts: Saiz 30; Rebs: Rossiter 18; Asts: Foster 9	Boxscore	Pts: Tamayo 24; Rebs: Eric 10; Asts: Yang J. 5	Arena: Arena Tachikawa Tachihi; Attendance: 2,489

21 January 2026	Changwon LG Sakers (South Korea)	81–88	(Japan) Alvark Tokyo	Changwon
19:10 (KST)	Scoring by quarter: 30–24, 13–22, 23–23, 15–19
	Pts: Marei 27; Rebs: Marei 10; Asts: Yang J. 6	Boxscore	Pts: Foster 27; Rebs: Rossiter 7 Asts: Rossiter 8	Arena: Changwon Gymnasium

4 February 2026	Alvark Tokyo (Japan)	92–79	(Chinese Taipei) New Taipei Kings	Tachikawa
19:10 (JST)	Scoring by quarter: 20–13, 22–24, 30–20, 20–22
	Pts: Foster 29; Rebs: Rossiter 12; Asts: Rossiter 10	Boxscore	Pts: Harris 24; Rebs: Washburn 9 Asts: Harris 7	Arena: Arena Tachikawa Tachihi; Attendance: 2,459

11 February 2026	Ulaanbaatar Xac Broncos (Mongolia)	93–97	(Japan) Alvark Tokyo	Ulaanbaatar
19:10 (ULAT)	Scoring by quarter: 20–22, 21–22, 24–22, 28–31
	Pts: Miller 25; Rebs: Tshimanga 15; Asts: Barsbold 12	Boxscore	Pts: Saiz 38; Rebs: Rossiter 12; Asts: Foster 9	Arena: M bank Arena

== Finals ==
The finals was held in Macau, China.

Quarterfinals
(Chinese Taipei) Taoyuan Pauian Pilots	89
(South Korea) Seoul SK Knights	69
(Japan) Utsunomiya Brex	85
(Chinese Taipei) New Taipei Kings	64

Semifinals
(Japan) Alvark Tokyo	76
(Chinese Taipei) Taoyuan Pauian Pilots	102
(Japan) Ryukyu Golden Kings	96
(Japan) Utsunomiya Brex	103

Championship
(Chinese Taipei) Taoyuan Pauian Pilots	81
(Japan) Utsunomiya Brex	90
Third place
(Japan) Alvark Tokyo	76
(Japan) Ryukyu Golden Kings	77

=== Quarterfinals ===
Note: All times are Macau Standard Time (UTC+8)

18 March 2026
17:00

Boxscore

Taoyuan Pauian Pilots (Chinese Taipei)	89–69	(South Korea) Seoul SK Knights
Scoring by quarter: 21–14, 23–18, 28–20, 17–17
Pts: Graham 19; Rebs: Brown 9 Asts: three players 3		Pts: Tolentino, Warney 18; Rebs: Monroe 12; Asts: Warney 5

Tap Seac Multi-sports Pavilion, Macau

18 March 2026
19:30

Boxscore

Utsunomiya Brex (Japan)	85–64	(Chinese Taipei) New Taipei Kings
Scoring by quarter: 12–23, 36–14, 19–13, 18–14
Pts: Jerrett 27; Rebs: Jerrett 12; Asts: Newbill 6		Pts: Harris 18; Rebs: Washburn 10; Asts: Harris 5

Tap Seac Multi-sports Pavilion, Macau

=== Semifinals ===
20 March 2026
18:00

Boxscore

Ryukyu Golden Kings (Japan)	96–103	(Japan) Utsunomiya Brex
Scoring by quarter: 27–20, 19–30, 25–13, 25–40
Pts: Kirk 23; Rebs: Cooley 12; Asts: Kishimoto 6		Pts: Jerrett, Newbill 29; Rebs: Newbill 8 Asts: Newbill 9

Studio City Event Center, Macau

20 March 2026
20:30

Boxscore

Alvark Tokyo (Japan)	76–102	(Chinese Taipei) Taoyuan Pauian Pilots
Scoring by quarter: 30–21, 24–29, 11–29, 11–23
Pts: Foster 21; Rebs: Saiz 8 Asts: Toews 8		Pts: Artino 26; Rebs: Brown 13; Asts: Brown 7

Studio City Event Center, Macau

=== Third place game ===
22 March 2026
15:00

Boxscore

Alvark Tokyo (Japan)	76–77	(Japan) Ryukyu Golden Kings
Scoring by quarter: 21–19, 11–19, 20–16, 24–23
Pts: Davies 25; Rebs: Saiz 7 Asts: Toews 6		Pts: Cooley 20; Rebs: Dotson 9 Asts: Matsuwaki 5

Studio City Event Center, Macau

=== Championship game ===
22 March 2026
18:00

Boxscore

Taoyuan Pauian Pilots (Chinese Taipei)	81–90	(Japan) Utsunomiya Brex
Scoring by quarter: 13–39, 19–12, 24–21, 25–18
Pts: Graham 23; Rebs: Artino 8 Asts: four players 4		Pts: Newbill 21; Rebs: Edwards 10; Asts: Newbill 8

Studio City Event Center, Macau

== Qualification for 2026 Basketball Champions League Asia ==
On 15 December 2025, the FIBA announced that EASL became the official qualifier for Basketball Champions League Asia (BCL Asia). The top performing EASL teams representing B.League, Korean Basketball League and the Philippine Basketball Association would secure direct qualification to BCL Asia. On September 3, 2026, the FIBA announced that 2026 Basketball Champions League Asia was cancelled.

Team	Qualified on	Qualified as
(Philippines) Meralco Bolts	15 December 2025	2025–26 EASL PBA top performing team
(South Korea) Seoul SK Knights	28 January 2026	2025–26 EASL KBL top performing team
(Japan) Utsunomiya Brex	20 March 2026	2025–26 EASL B.League top performing team
