= 2024–25 B1 League season =

Japanese basketball league season

- League: B1 League
- Season: 2024–25
- Duration: 5 October 2024 – 4 May 2025 (Regular season); 9 May 2024 – 27 May 2025 (Playoffs)
- Games played: 60
- Teams: 24

B1 Regular season
- Top seed: Utsunomiya Brex
- Season MVP: (United States) D. J. Newbill (Utsunomiya)

B1 Finals
- Champions: Utsunomiya Brex
- Finals MVP: (United States) D. J. Newbill (Utsunomiya)

Statistical leaders
- Points: (Australia) Brock Motum (Shiga)
- Rebounds: (United States) Thomas Welsh (Hokkaido)
- Assists: (Japan) Ryusei Sasaki (San-en)

The 2024–25 B1 League season was the ninth season of the B1 League, the top Japanese professional basketball league, since its establishment in 2015. The regular season began on 5 October 2024.

The Hiroshima Dragonflies were the defending champions, having won their first B1 League title after defeating the Ryukyu Golden Kings in the 2024 finals. Utsunomiya Brex won the title, after defeating the Ryukyu Golden Kings in three games in the finals. As champions, they qualified for the 2025 Basketball Champions League Asia and the 2025–26 East Asia Super League. D. J. Newbill stood out individually this season, winning both the season MVP and finals MVP awards.

== Teams ==
Locations of teams of the 2024–25 B1 League season
Red: East Division; Blue: Central Division; Yellow: West Division.
Location of teams within Aichi Prefecture, Chūkyō region

=== Team changes ===
Promoted from 2023–24 B2 League	Relegated from 2023–24 B1 League
Shiga Lakes; Koshigaya Alphas	Shinshu Brave Warriors; Toyama Grouses

=== Coaching changes ===
Team	Outgoing	Incoming
Off-season
Utsunomiya Brex	Norio Sassa	Kevin Braswell
Hiroshima Dragonflies	Kyle Milling	Shogo Asayama
Gunma Crane Thunders	Kota Mizuno	Kyle Milling
Yokohama B-Corsairs	Taketo Aoki	Lassi Tuovi
Nagasaki Velca	Kenjiro Maeda	Mody Maor
Shiga Lakes	David Gómez	Kenjiro Maeda
Kawasaki Brave Thunders	Kenji Sato	Ronen Ginzburg
Ibaraki Robots	Richard Glesnann	Chris Holm
Sendai 89ers	Hiroki Fujita	Yoshiro Ochiai
Chiba Jets	John Patrick	Trevor Gleeson
In-season
Utsunomiya Brex	Kevin Braswell (†)	Zico Coronel (interim)
Sun Rockers Shibuya	Luka Pavićević	Kyle Bailey (interim)

==== In-season ====
- On 24 January 2025, Utsunomiya Brex named Zico Coronel the interim head coach after Kevin Braswell was hospitalized. The team announced the death of Braswell on 24 February 2025.
- On 15 April 2025, Sun Rockers Shibuya terminated the contract of head coach Luka Pavićević. Kyle Bailey was announced as the interim head coach for the remainder of the season.

== Foreign players ==
This is the full list of international players competing in the 2024–25 season.

Team	Player 1	Player 2	Player 3	Player 4	Replaced
Akita Northern Happinets	(Taiwan) Mohammad Gadiaga	(United States) Tanner Leissner	(Nigeria) Christian Mekowulu	(France) Yannis Morin	–
Alvark Tokyo	(Lithuania) Artūras Gudaitis	(Brazil) Léonardo Meindl	(Spain) Sebastián Saiz	–	–
Chiba Jets	(United States) D. J. Hogg	(United States) John Mooney	(China) Michael Ou	(United States) Chris Smith	–
Fighting Eagles Nagoya	(United States) Isaac Butts	(United States) Justin Harper	(United States) Sean O'Mara	(Taiwan) Tseng Hsiang-chun	–
Gunma Crane Thunders	(United States) Trey McKinney-Jones	(United States) Kaleb Tarczewski	(Germany) Johannes Thiemann	–	–
Hiroshima Dragonflies	(United States) Kerry Blackshear	(United States) Dwayne Evans	(United States) Nick Mayo	(United States) Worth Smith	–
Ibaraki Robots	(United States) Robert Franks	(United States) Eric Jacobsen	(China) Sun Siyao	(United States) Chehales Tapscott	–
Kawasaki Brave Thunders	(Hungary) Rosco Allen	(United States) Alize Johnson	(United Kingdom) Sacha Killeya-Jones	(Philippines) Matthew Wright	–
Koshigaya Alphas	(United States) Jeff Gibbs	(United States) L. J. Peak	(United States) Tim Soares	(Philippines) Kai Sotto	–
Kyoto Hannaryz	(United States) Angelo Caloiaro	(United States) Jordan Heath	(United States) Charles Jackson	–	–
Levanga Hokkaido	(United States) Terry Allen	(United States) Ryan Kriener	(Philippines) Dwight Ramos	(United States) Thomas Welsh	–
Nagasaki Velca	(United States) Jarrell Brantley	(Philippines) A. J. Edu	(United States) Mark Smith	(United States) Stephen Zack	–
Nagoya Diamond Dolphins	(United States) Zylan Cheatham	(United States) Scott Eatherton	(United States) Luke Maye	–	–
Osaka Evessa	(United States) Matt Bonds	(Ukraine) Volodymyr Gerun	(United States) Ryan Luther	(Philippines) Ray Parks	–
Ryukyu Golden Kings	(United States) Keve Aluma	(United States) Jack Cooley	(United States) Vic Law	–	–
Saga Ballooners	(United States) Yoeli Childs	(United States) Chase Fieler	(Cuba) Reynaldo Garcia	–	–
San-en NeoPhoenix	(United States) David Dudzinski	(United States) Yante Maten	(United States) David Nwaba	–	–
SeaHorses Mikawa	(Greece) Zach Auguste	(United States) Davante Gardner	(United States) Jake Layman	–	–
Sendai 89ers	(United States) Nathan Boothe	(Brazil) Cristiano Felício	(United States) Stanton Kidd	(South Korea) Yang Jae-min	–
Shiga Lakes	(United States) Javier Carter	(United States) Markeith Cummings	(Australia) Brock Motum	(Taiwan) Yu Ai-che	–
Shimane Susanoo Magic	(United States) Coty Clarke	(Australia) Nick Kay	(United States) J. M. McAdoo	–	–
Sun Rockers Shibuya	(United States) Anthony Clemmons	(United States) Kevin Jones	(United States) Reid Travis	–	–
Utsunomiya Brex	(New Zealand) Isaac Fotu	(United States) Grant Jerrett	(United States) D. J. Newbill	–	–
Yokohama B-Corsairs	(United States) Gary Clark	(France) Damien Inglis	(Estonia) Maik Kotsar	(Philippines) Kiefer Ravena	–

== Regular season ==
=== Standings ===
==== Central Division ====
Pos	Team	Pld	W	L	PF	PA	PD	PCT	Qualification or relegation
1	San-en NeoPhoenix	59	47	12	5355	4691	+664	.797	Qualification to playoffs
2	Alvark Tokyo	60	44	16	4566	4211	+355	.733	Qualification to playoffs
3	SeaHorses Mikawa	60	39	21	4903	4562	+341	.650	Wildcard
4	Nagoya Diamond Dolphins	60	35	25	4928	4765	+163	.583	
5	Fighting Eagles Nagoya	60	30	30	4689	4756	−67	.500	
6	Sun Rockers Shibuya	60	30	30	4356	4252	+104	.500	
7	Yokohama B-Corsairs	60	24	36	4513	4770	−257	.400	
8	Kawasaki Brave Thunders	60	18	42	4725	5195	−470	.300	

Source: B.League

==== East Division ====
Pos	Team	Pld	W	L	PF	PA	PD	PCT	Qualification or relegation
1	Utsunomiya Brex	60	48	12	5074	4507	+567	.800	Qualification to playoffs
2	Chiba Jets	60	42	18	4913	4567	+346	.700	Qualification to playoffs
3	Gunma Crane Thunders	60	39	21	4649	4294	+355	.650	Wildcard
4	Akita Northern Happinets	60	28	32	4377	4473	−96	.467	
5	Levanga Hokkaido	60	21	39	4529	4795	−266	.350	
6	Koshigaya Alphas	60	19	41	4485	4835	−350	.317	
7	Ibaraki Robots	60	15	45	4354	4775	−421	.250	
8	Sendai 89ers	60	11	49	4350	4954	−604	.183	

Source: B.League

==== West Division ====
Pos	Team	Pld	W	L	PF	PA	PD	PCT	Qualification or relegation
1	Ryukyu Golden Kings	60	46	14	5129	4581	+548	.767	Qualification to playoffs
2	Shimane Susanoo Magic	60	37	23	4785	4518	+267	.617	Qualification to playoffs
3	Kyoto Hannaryz	60	33	27	4920	4800	+120	.550	
4	Osaka Evessa	60	29	31	4917	5023	−106	.483	
5	Hiroshima Dragonflies	60	28	32	4813	4982	−169	.467	
6	Nagasaki Velca	60	26	34	4548	4697	−149	.433	
7	Saga Ballooners	60	22	38	4588	4745	−157	.367	
8	Shiga Lakes	59	8	51	4546	5264	−718	.136	

Source: B.League

=== Canceled games ===
- 5 January: Shiga Lakes vs. San-en NeoPhoenix was abandoned after Javier Carter suffered a medical emergency on the court.

=== Statistics ===
==== Individual statistic leaders ====
Category	Player	Team	Statistic
Points per game	(Australia) Brock Motum	Shiga Lakes	21.4
Rebounds per game	(United States) Thomas Welsh	Levanga Hokkaido	13.6
Assists per game	(Japan) Ryusei Sasaki	San-en NeoPhoenix	6.5
Steals per game	(United States) Aaron Henry	Fighting Eagles Nagoya	2.4
Blocks per game	(United Kingdom) Sacha Killeya-Jones	Kawasaki Brave Thunders	2.0
FG%	(United States) Scott Eatherton	Nagoya Diamond Dolphins	60.5%
3FG%	(Japan) Makoto Hiejima	Utsunomiya Brex	44.3%
FT%	(Japan) Ryusei Shinoyama	Kawasaki Brave Thunders	91.7%

==== Team statistic leaders ====
Category	Team	Statistic
Points per game	San-en NeoPhoenix	90.8
Rebounds per game	Ryukyu Golden Kings	34.5
Assists per game	San-en NeoPhoenix	22.6
Steals per game	Akita Northern Happinets	8.2
Blocks per game	San-en NeoPhoenix	3.9
FG%	Kyoto Hannaryz	47.3%
3FG%	San-en NeoPhoenix	35.7%
FT%	Ryukyu Golden Kings	77.9%

== Playoffs ==
=== Bracket ===
All matches in the playoffs are in a best-of-three series. Teams in bold advanced to the next round.

Quarterfinals
**1**	**Utsunomiya Brex**	**2**
8	SeaHorses Mikawa	0
4	Alvark Tokyo	0
**5**	**Chiba Jets**	**2**
**2**	**San-en NeoPhoenix**	**2**
7	Gunma Crane Thunders	0
**3**	**Ryukyu Golden Kings**	**2**
6	Shimane Susanoo Magic	0

Semifinals
**1**	**Utsunomiya Brex**	**2**
5	Chiba Jets	1
2	San-en NeoPhoenix	1
**3**	**Ryukyu Golden Kings**	**2**

Finals
**1**	**Utsunomiya Brex**	**2**
3	Ryukyu Golden Kings	1

==== Quarter-finals ====
===== (1) Utsunomiya Brex vs. (8) SeaHorses Mikawa =====
10 May 2025

boxscore

**Utsunomiya Brex**	**93**–81	SeaHorses Mikawa
Scoring by quarter: **19**–14, **24**–18, 22–22, **28**–27
Pts: Edwards 20; Rebs: Fotu 7 Asts: Newbill 7		Pts: Gardner 20; Rebs: Layman 8 Asts: Nagano 5
**Utsunomiya leads series, 1–0**

Nikkan Arena Tochigi, Utsunomiya
Attendance: 6,262
Referees: Takaki Kato, Yuki Kubo, Tomohiro Hosoda

11 May 2025

boxscore

**Utsunomiya Brex**	**89**–75	SeaHorses Mikawa
Scoring by quarter: **28**–22, **19**–17, **22**–10, 20–**26**
Pts: Hiejima 18; Rebs: Fotu, Jerrett 6 Asts: Newbill 11		Pts: Gardner 22; Rebs: Auguste, Gardner 8 Asts: Nagano 7
**Utsunomiya won series, 2–0**

Nikkan Arena Tochigi, Utsunomiya
Attendance: 6,209
Referees: Takaki Kato, Yuki Kubo, Tomohiro Hosoda

===== (2) San-en NeoPhoenix vs. (7) Gunma Crane Thunders =====
10 May 2025

boxscore

**San-en NeoPhoenix**	**83**–80	Gunma Crane Thunders
Scoring by quarter: **29**–25, 19–**21**, **20**–13, 15–**21**
Pts: Nwaba 17; Rebs: Nwaba 10; Asts: Sasaki 8		Pts: McKinney-Jones 23; Rebs: Parker 8 Asts: Tsuji 5
**San-en leads series, 1–0**

Hamamatsu Arena, Hamamatsu
Attendance: 4,349
Referees: Abe Kiyoshi, Ohno Tahiro, Takano Kohei

11 May 2025

boxscore

**San-en NeoPhoenix**	**93**–84	Gunma Crane Thunders
Scoring by quarter: **25**–22, **25**–10, 18–**24**, 25–**28**
Pts: Nwaba 26; Rebs: Nwaba 8 Asts: Nwaba, Oura, Sasaki 4		Pts: Fujii 22; Rebs: McKinney-Jones 6 Asts: Fujii 9
**San-en won series, 2–0**

Hamamatsu Arena, Hamamatsu
Attendance: 4,378
Referees: Abe Kiyoshi, Ohno Tahiro, Takano Kohei

===== (3) Ryukyu Golden Kings vs. (6) Shimane Susanoo Magic =====
9 May 2025

boxscore

**Ryukyu Golden Kings**	**79**–71	Shimane Susanoo Magic
Scoring by quarter: 16–**19**, 22–22, **22**–13, **19**–17
Pts: Law 15; Rebs: Aluma, Cooley 9 Asts: Law 5		Pts: Tsuyama 21; Rebs: Kay 8 Asts: Kay, Tsuyama 4
**Ryukyu leads series, 1–0**

Okinawa Arena, Okinawa
Attendance: 8,720
Referees: Daigo Urushibara, Jun Horiuchi, Toshihiro Aoki

10 May 2025

boxscore

**Ryukyu Golden Kings**	**88**–70	Shimane Susanoo Magic
Scoring by quarter: **25**–18, 21–**27**, **20**–5, **22**–20
Pts: Law 26; Rebs: Law 9 Asts: Law, Onodera 4		Pts: Clarke 21; Rebs: Evans 7 Asts: Chika, Kay 5
**Ryukyu won series, 2–0**

Okinawa Arena, Okinawa
Attendance: 8,745
Referees: Daigo Urushibara, Jun Horiuchi, Toshihiro Aoki

===== (4) Alvark Tokyo vs. (5) Chiba Jets =====
10 May 2025

boxscore

Alvark Tokyo	53–**78**	**Chiba Jets**
Scoring by quarter: 8–**23**, **18**–16, 13–**23**, 14–**16**
Pts: Meindl 12; Rebs: Saiz 11; Asts: Rossiter 4		Pts: Smith 21; Rebs: Mooney 10; Asts: Segawa 4
**Chiba leads series, 1–0**

Ariake Coliseum, Ariake
Attendance: 8,931
Referees: Norito Okawara, Yuji Hirahara, Kenji Tomishima

11 May 2025

boxscore

Alvark Tokyo	65–**92**	**Chiba Jets**
Scoring by quarter: 14–**22**, 14–**28**, 12–**20**, **25**–22
Pts: Meindl 17; Rebs: Rossiter 9 Asts: Meindl 6		Pts: Smith 20; Rebs: Mooney 9 Asts: Hogg, Mooney 4
**Chiba won series, 2–0**

Ariake Coliseum, Ariake
Attendance: 9,374
Referees: Norito Okawara, Yuji Hirahara, Kenji Tomishima

==== Semi-finals ====
===== (1) Utsunomiya Brex vs. (5) Chiba Jets =====
17 May 2025

boxscore

**Utsunomiya Brex**	**84**–67	Chiba Jets
Scoring by quarter: 14–**21**, **20**–13, **25**–18, **25**–15
Pts: Newbill 24; Rebs: Edwards 9 Asts: Ogawa 6		Pts: Hogg 17; Rebs: Mooney 12; Asts: Togashi 7
**Utsunomiya leads series, 1–0**

Nikkan Arena Tochigi, Utsunomiya
Attendance: 6,206
Referees: Abe Sei, Katayose Tatsu, Horiuchi Jun

18 May 2025

boxscore

Utsunomiya Brex	55–**74**	**Chiba Jets**
Scoring by quarter: **16**–13, 13–**19**, 9–**26**, **17**–16
Pts: Jerrett 12; Rebs: Newbill 7 Asts: Endo, Jerrett, Newbill 2		Pts: Smith 23; Rebs: Hara 7 Asts: Hogg, Segawa, Togashi 3
**Series tied, 1–1**

Nikkan Arena Tochigi, Utsunomiya
Attendance: 6,245
Referees: Abe Sei, Katayose Tatsu, Horiuchi Jun

19 May 2025

boxscore

**Utsunomiya Brex**	**82**–71	Chiba Jets
Scoring by quarter: 13–**15**, **30**–16, 18–18, 21–**22**
Pts: Jerrett 27; Rebs: Newbill 8 Asts: Newbill 6		Pts: Smith 22; Rebs: Mooney 8 Asts: Hogg, Togashi 5
**Utsunomiya won series, 2–1**

Nikkan Arena Tochigi, Utsunomiya
Attendance: 6,185
Referees: Abe Sei, Katayose Tatsu, Horiuchi Jun

===== (2) San-en NeoPhoenix vs. (3) Ryukyu Golden Kings =====
17 May 2025

boxscore

**San-en NeoPhoenix**	**87**–85	Ryukyu Golden Kings
Scoring by quarter: **24**–22, 20–**23**, **29**–17, 14–**23**
Pts: Nwaba 23; Rebs: Dudzinski 8 Asts: Oura, Sasaki 5		Pts: Law 17; Rebs: Law 14; Asts: Waki 6
**San-en leads series, 1–0**

Hamamatsu Arena, Hamamatsu
Attendance: 4,326
Referees: Norito Okawara, Kohei Kano, Takeo Kitazawa

18 May 2025

boxscore

San-en NeoPhoenix	98–**100** (2OT)	**Ryukyu Golden Kings**
Scoring by quarter: **15**–14, 20–**29**, **22**–17, **22**–19, Overtime: 9–9, 10–**12**
Pts: Nwaba 26; Rebs: Nwaba 13; Asts: Oura 9		Pts: Cooley 26; Rebs: Cooley 16; Asts: Law 6
**Series tied, 1–1**

Hamamatsu Arena, Hamamatsu
Attendance: 4,713
Referees: Norito Okawara, Kohei Kano, Takeo Kitazawa

19 May 2025

boxscore

San-en NeoPhoenix	69–**77**	**Ryukyu Golden Kings**
Scoring by quarter: 16–**27**, **26**–16, **17**–16, 10–**18**
Pts: Maten 27; Rebs: Maten 9 Asts: Nemoto, Oura 5		Pts: Law 30; Rebs: Law 10; Asts: Ito 5
**Ryukyu won series, 2–1**

Hamamatsu Arena, Hamamatsu
Attendance: 4,078
Referees: Norito Okawara, Kohei Kano, Takeo Kitazawa

== Finals ==
=== (1) Utsunomiya Brex vs. (3) Ryukyu Golden Kings ===
24 May 2025

boxscore

Utsunomiya Brex	81–68	Ryukyu Golden Kings
Scoring by quarter: 24–20, 17–15, 18–10, 22–23
Pts: Newbill 25; Rebs: Hiejima 6 Asts: Newbill 6		Pts: Law 18; Rebs: Kirk 12; Asts: Ito, Kirk, Law 3
Utsunomiya leads series, 1–0

Nikkan Arena Tochigi, Utsunomiya
Attendance: 13,121
Referees: Takaki Kato, Daigo Urushibara, Tsuyoshi Hiraide

25 May 2025

boxscore

Utsunomiya Brex	75–87	Ryukyu Golden Kings
Scoring by quarter: 20–21, 23–14, 21–28, 11–24
Pts: Newbill 21; Rebs: Newbill 7 Asts: Newbill 7		Pts: Law 19; Rebs: Aluma, Cooley 10; Asts: Waki 8
Series tied, 1–1

Nikkan Arena Tochigi, Utsunomiya
Attendance: 13,273
Referees: Takaki Kato, Daigo Urushibara, Tsuyoshi Hiraide

27 May 2025

boxscore

Utsunomiya Brex	73–71	Ryukyu Golden Kings
Scoring by quarter: 11–18, 17–22, 16–11, 29–20
Pts: Newbill 19; Rebs: Edwards 9 Asts: Newbill 5		Pts: Law 16; Rebs: Law 13; Asts: Waki 5
Utsunomiya won series, 2–1

Nikkan Arena Tochigi, Utsunomiya
Attendance: 13,159
Referees: Takaki Kato, Daigo Urushibara, Tsuyoshi Hiraide

== B1 League clubs in Asian competitions ==
Team	Competition	Progress
Hiroshima Dragonflies	Basketball Champions League Asia	Semifinals, 3rd place
Hiroshima Dragonflies	East Asia Super League	Finals, Champions
Ryukyu Golden Kings	East Asia Super League	Semifinals, 4th place
