= 2025–26 B1 League season =

Japanese basketball league season

- League: B1 League
- Season: 2025–26
- Duration: 3 October 2025 – May 2026
- Teams: 26

The 2025–26 B1 League season, also known as the 2025–26 Resona Group B1 League season (Japanese: 2025–26シーズン りそなグループ B1リーグ, Hepburn: 2025–26 Shīzun Resona Group B1 Rīgu) for sponsorship reasons, is the tenth season of the B1 League, the top Japanese professional basketball league, since its establishment in 2015. It was also the final season under the promotion and relegation setup, as the league structure will change in the 2026–27 season, with the B1 division becoming the B.League Premier.

Utsunomiya Brex are the defending champions, having won their third B.League title after defeating the Ryukyu Golden Kings in the 2025 finals.

== Changes from last season ==
=== Format ===
The teams will now be split between two conferences instead of three as in previous seasons.

=== Team changes ===
Altiri Chiba and Toyama Grouses were promoted from the B2 League. Relegation from the B1 League was suspended last season as part of the lead up to the upcoming league reformatting.

== Teams ==
Locations of teams of the 2025–26 B1 League season
Pink: East Division; Yellow: West Division.
Location of teams within Aichi Prefecture, Chūkyō region

== Regular season ==
=== Standings ===
(As of May 3rd, 2026)

#	East Division	GP	W	L	PCT	GB
1	Utsunomiya Brex	60	45	15	.750	—
2	Chiba Jets	60	42	18	.700	3
3	Gunma Crane Thunders	60	42	18	.700	3
4	Alvark Tokyo	60	41	19	.683	4
5	Levanga Hokkaido	60	37	23	.617	8
6	Sendai 89ers	60	35	25	.583	10
7	Yokohama B-Corsairs	60	26	34	.433	19
8	Sunrockers Shibuya	60	25	35	.417	20
9	Koshigaya Alphas	60	21	39	.350	24
10	Ibaraki Robots	60	19	41	.317	26
11	Altiri Chiba	60	19	41	.317	26
12	Kawasaki Brave Thunders	60	16	44	.267	29
13	Akita Northern Happinets	60	10	50	.167	35

#	West Division	GP	W	L	PCT	GB
1	Nagasaki Velca	60	47	13	.783	—
2	Seahorses Mikawa	60	43	17	.717	4
3	Ryukyu Golden Kings	60	42	18	.700	5
4	Nagoya Diamond Dolphins	60	41	19	.683	6
5	San-en NeoPhoenix	60	36	24	.600	11
6	Saga Ballooners	60	32	28	.533	15
7	Hiroshima Dragonflies	60	31	29	.517	16
8	Shimane Susanoo Magic	60	28	32	.467	19
9	Osaka Evessa	60	23	37	.383	24
10	Shiga Lakes	60	23	37	.383	24
11	Kyoto Hannaryz	60	20	40	.333	27
12	Toyama Grouses	60	18	42	.300	29
13	Fighting Eagles Nagoya	60	18	42	.300	29

== B1 League clubs in Asian competitions ==
Team	Competition	Progress	Result	W–L
Utsunomiya Brex	Basketball Champions League Asia	Group stage	Loss vs. (Samahang Basketbol ng Pilipinas) Meralco Bolts	4–1
Utsunomiya Brex	Basketball Champions League Asia	Group stage	Win vs. (United Arab Emirates Basketball Association) Shabab Al Ahli	4–1
Utsunomiya Brex	Basketball Champions League Asia	Quarter-finals	2OT Win vs. (Islamic Republic of Iran Basketball Federation) Tabiat	4–1
Utsunomiya Brex	Basketball Champions League Asia	Semi-finals	Win vs. (Mongolian Basketball Association) Ulaanbaatar Xac Broncos	4–1
Utsunomiya Brex	Basketball Champions League Asia	Final	Win vs. (Lebanese Basketball Federation) Al Riyadi	4–1
Utsunomiya Brex	East Asia Super League	Group stage	OT Loss vs. (Chinese Taipei Basketball Association) Taipei Fubon Braves	7–2
Utsunomiya Brex	East Asia Super League	Group stage	Win vs. (Korea Basketball Association) Seoul SK Knights	7–2
Utsunomiya Brex	East Asia Super League	Group stage	Loss vs. (Korea Basketball Association) Seoul SK Knights	7–2
Utsunomiya Brex	East Asia Super League	Group stage	Win vs. (Hong Kong Basketball Association) Hong Kong Eastern	7–2
Utsunomiya Brex	East Asia Super League	Group stage	Win vs. (Hong Kong Basketball Association) Hong Kong Eastern	7–2
Utsunomiya Brex	East Asia Super League	Group stage	Win vs. (Chinese Taipei Basketball Association) Taipei Fubon Braves	7–2
Utsunomiya Brex	East Asia Super League	Quarter-finals	Win vs. (Chinese Taipei Basketball Association) New Taipei Kings	7–2
Utsunomiya Brex	East Asia Super League	Semi-finals	Win vs. (Japan Basketball Association) Ryukyu Golden Kings	7–2
Utsunomiya Brex	East Asia Super League	Championship	Win vs. (Chinese Taipei Basketball Association) Taoyuan Pauian Pilots	7–2
Alvark Tokyo	East Asia Super League	Group stage	Loss vs. (Mongolian Basketball Association) Ulaanbaatar Xac Broncos	5–3
Alvark Tokyo	East Asia Super League	Group stage	Win vs. (Chinese Taipei Basketball Association) New Taipei Kings	5–3
Alvark Tokyo	East Asia Super League	Group stage	Win vs. (Korea Basketball Association) Changwon LG Sakers	5–3
Alvark Tokyo	East Asia Super League	Group stage	Win vs. (Korea Basketball Association) Changwon LG Sakers	5–3
Alvark Tokyo	East Asia Super League	Group stage	Win vs. (Chinese Taipei Basketball Association) New Taipei Kings	5–3
Alvark Tokyo	East Asia Super League	Group stage	Win vs. (Mongolian Basketball Association) Ulaanbaatar Xac Broncos	5–3
Alvark Tokyo	East Asia Super League	Semi-finals	Loss vs. (Chinese Taipei Basketball Association) Taoyuan Pauian Pilots	5–3
Alvark Tokyo	East Asia Super League	Third place	Loss vs. (Japan Basketball Association) Ryukyu Golden Kings	5–3
Ryukyu Golden Kings	East Asia Super League	Group stage	Loss vs. (Chinese Taipei Basketball Association) Taoyuan Pauian Pilots	6–2
Ryukyu Golden Kings	East Asia Super League	Group stage	Win vs. (Samahang Basketbol ng Pilipinas) Meralco Bolts	6–2
Ryukyu Golden Kings	East Asia Super League	Group stage	Win vs. (Macau-China Basketball Association) Macau Black Bears	6–2
Ryukyu Golden Kings	East Asia Super League	Group stage	Win vs. (Macau-China Basketball Association) Macau Black Bears	6–2
Ryukyu Golden Kings	East Asia Super League	Group stage	Win vs. (Chinese Taipei Basketball Association) Taoyuan Pauian Pilots	6–2
Ryukyu Golden Kings	East Asia Super League	Group stage	Win vs. (Samahang Basketbol ng Pilipinas) Meralco Bolts	6–2
Ryukyu Golden Kings	East Asia Super League	Semi-finals	Loss vs. (Japan Basketball Association) Utsunomiya Brex	6–2
Ryukyu Golden Kings	East Asia Super League	Third place	Win vs. (Japan Basketball Association) Alvark Tokyo	6–2

== B1 League clubs in International competitions ==
Team	Competition	Progress	Result	W–L
Utsunomiya Brex	Intercontinental Cup	Group stage	Loss vs. (Spanish Basketball Federation) Unicaja	0–3
Utsunomiya Brex	Intercontinental Cup	Group stage	Loss vs. (Libyan Arab Basketball Federation) Al Ahli Tripoli	0–3
Utsunomiya Brex	Intercontinental Cup	Fifth place	Loss vs. (Basketball Australia) Illawarra Hawks	0–3
