= Gavin Edwards (basketball) =

American-born Japanese basketball player

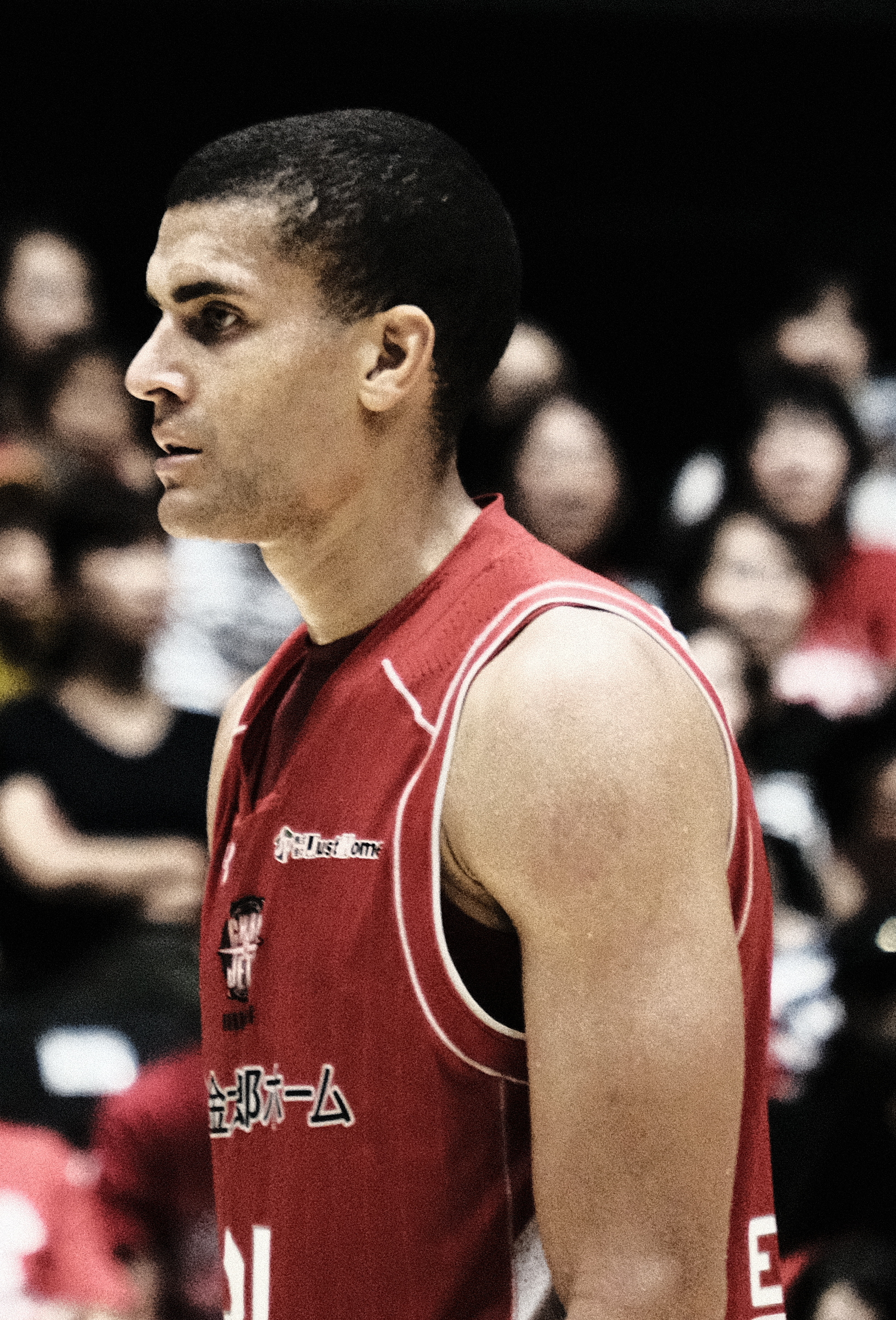

No. 33 – Utsunomiya Brex
- Position: Power forward / center
- League: B.League

Personal information
- Born: January 15, 1988 (age 38) Gilbert, Arizona, U.S.
- Listed height: 6 ft 9 in (2.06 m)
- Listed weight: 243 lb (110 kg)

Career information
- High school: Mesquite (Gilbert, Arizona)
- College: UConn (2006–2010)
- NBA draft: 2010: undrafted
- Playing career: 2010–present

Career history
- 2010: Anyang KGC
- 2010: BC Khimik
- 2010–2011: Springfield Armor
- 2011–2012: Peristeri B.C.
- 2012–2013: Westports KL Dragons
- 2013–2017: Aisin SeaHorses Mikawa
- 2017–2023: Chiba Jets Funabashi
- 2023–present: Utsunomiya Brex

Career highlights
- EASL champion (2026); B.League Champion (2025); 2× NBL Blockshot leader (2015, 2016); NBL All-Star (2015); B.League All-Star (2019)

Gavin Earl Edwards (born January 15, 1988, in Gilbert, Arizona) is a U.S.-born Japanese professional basketball player for Utsunomiya Brex in Japan. He is also a member of the Japanese men's national basketball team and competed for them in the 2020 Summer Olympics held in Tokyo.

== College ==
Edwards played collegiate basketball at UConn Huskies men's basketball.

== Professional and National Team career ==
Edwards plays professional basketball in Japan in the B.League, and as a naturalized import for the Japanese national team. “It’s not exactly how you’d picture going because you always think, ‘I’d love to play on Team USA,’ but everybody wants to play in the Olympics,” said Edwards, who played at UConn in 2006-10 and has played professionally in Japan for the past eight years." He was one of the last members to be selected.

== Career statistics ==
Legend
GP	Games played	GS	Games started	MPG	Minutes per game
FG%	Field goal percentage	3P%	3-point field goal percentage	FT%	Free throw percentage
RPG	Rebounds per game	APG	Assists per game	SPG	Steals per game
BPG	Blocks per game	PPG	Points per game	**Bold**	Career high

Year	Team	GP	GS	MPG	FG%	3P%	FT%	RPG	APG	SPG	BPG	PPG
2013–14	Aisin	53	12	23.6	60.7	50.0	64.7	8.1	1.0	0.5	1.8	13.9
2014–15	Aisin	54	5	22.9	63.8	20.0	66.0	7.9	1.3	0.8	1.9	13.8
2015–16	Aisin	53	13	25.3	57.8	36.4	71.6	7.8	1.4	0.8	1.8	15.0
2016–17	Mikawa	60	16	26.0	54.5	29.2	68.8	7.5	1.5	0.8	1.2	14.6
2017–18	Chiba	60	59	29.0	60.9	25.7	64.4	7.7	2.8	0.9	1.2	18.1

== Personal ==
Edwards and his wife, Elle, have a son and daughter. His wife and children live in Arizona while he lives in Funabashi. He is a naturalized Japanese citizen, which allowed him to compete in the 2020 Tokyo Olympics.

His father, Earl Edwards is a former American football player.
