= Grant Jerrett =

American basketball player (born 1993)

No. 33 – Ryukyu Golden Kings
- Position: Power forward / center
- League: B.League

Personal information
- Born: July 8, 1993 (age 33) Costa Mesa, California, U.S.
- Listed height: 6 ft 10 in (2.08 m)
- Listed weight: 232 lb (105 kg)

Career information
- High school: Lutheran (La Verne, California)
- College: Arizona (2012–2013)
- NBA draft: 2013: 2nd round, 40th overall pick
- Drafted by: Portland Trail Blazers
- Playing career: 2013–present

Career history
- 2013–2014: Tulsa 66ers
- 2014–2015: Oklahoma City Thunder
- 2014–2015: →Oklahoma City Blue
- 2015: Utah Jazz
- 2015: →Idaho Stampede
- 2016: Canton Charge
- 2016–2017: Beijing Ducks
- 2018: Canton Charge
- 2018: SeaHorses Mikawa
- 2019: Igokea
- 2019–2020: ratiopharm Ulm
- 2020–2021: Darüşşafaka Tekfen
- 2021–2022: Avtodor
- 2022–2026: Utsunomiya Brex
- 2026-present: Ryukyu Golden Kings

Career highlights
- EASL champion (2026); B.League Champion (2025); Bosnian Cup winner (2019); NBA D-League All-Rookie Second Team (2014); McDonald's All-American (2012); First-team Parade All-American (2012)
- Stats at NBA.com
- Stats at Basketball Reference

Grant Alexander Jerrett (born July 8, 1993) is an American professional basketball player for Ryukyu Golden Kings of the Japanese B.League. He played college basketball for the Arizona Wildcats.

== Early life ==
Jerrett was born to Lamont and Barbara Jerrett on July 8, 1993, in Costa Mesa, California. He attended Lutheran High School in La Verne, California.

As a junior in 2010–11, Jerrett averaged 18.0 points, 10.1 rebounds and 3.4 blocked shots per game for coach Eric Cooper Sr. while leading Lutheran to the 2011 California Division 3 state championship game, where Jarrett posted 16 points and 10 rebounds. He was also named an all-CIF Southern Section Division 3AA performer in 2010–11.

On November 14, 2011, Jerrett signed a National Letter of Intent to play college basketball for the University of Arizona.

As a high school senior in 2011–12, Jerrett averaged 22.3 points, 10.0 rebounds, and 2.4 blocks in leading the Trojans to a 25–8 record. He was subsequently named a 2012 Parade All-American and the Gatorade California Player of the Year. Jarrett also participated in the 2012 McDonald's All-American Boys Game and Jordan Brand Classic.

Considered a five-star recruit by ESPN.com, Jerrett was listed as the No. 2 power forward and the No. 9 player in the nation in 2012.

== College career ==
In his lone season at Arizona playing for coach Sean Miller, Jerrett averaged 5.2 points and 3.6 rebounds in 34 games and two starts. He recorded season highs of 15 points against Oral Roberts and 10 rebounds against UCLA. Following the 2012–13 season, Jarrett announced his intentions to leave Arizona and either declare for the NBA draft or join another school.

On April 18, 2013, Jarrett declared for the NBA draft, forgoing his final three years of college eligibility.

== Professional career ==
=== Oklahoma City Thunder / Tulsa 66ers (2014–2015) ===
Jerrett was selected 40th overall by the Portland Trail Blazers in the 2013 NBA draft. His draft rights were later traded to the Oklahoma City Thunder for cash considerations on draft night. In July 2013, Jarrett joined the Thunder for the 2013 NBA Summer League.

On November 1, 2013, Jerrett was selected with the first overall pick in the 2013 NBA Development League Draft by the Tulsa 66ers, the Thunder's D-League affiliate team. On April 7, 2014, he signed with the Thunder for the rest of the 2013–14 season.

On July 16, 2014, Jerrett re-signed with the Thunder to a multi-year deal. During his sophomore season with the Thunder, Jarrett had multiple assignments with the Oklahoma City Blue of the NBA Development League. On November 28, Jerrett made his long-awaited NBA debut in the Thunder's 105–78 victory over the New York Knicks. In just under nine minutes of action, Jerrett recorded three points, a rebound, and an assist.

=== Utah Jazz (2015) ===
On February 19, 2015, Jerrett was traded to the Utah Jazz in a three-team trade that also involved the Detroit Pistons. On March 10, he was assigned to the Idaho Stampede. Jerrett was recalled by the Jazz on March 19, reassigned on March 26, and recalled again on April 6.

On October 15, 2015, Jerrett was waived by the Jazz.

=== Portland Trail Blazers (2016) ===
On August 16, 2016, Jerrett signed with the Portland Trail Blazers. However, he was later waived on October 21 after appearing in four preseason games.

=== Canton Charge (2016) ===
On November 20, 2016, Jarrett was acquired by the Canton Charge and made his debut that night in a 103–96 loss to the Westchester Knicks, recording four points and three rebounds in 19 minutes off the bench. On December 16, Jerrett terminated his contract with Canton. In 10 games, Jerrett averaged 12.8 points, 7.2 rebounds, 2.0 assists, and 1.0 block in 37.0 minutes.

=== China (2016–2017) ===
On December 16, 2016, Jerrett signed with the Beijing Ducks of the Chinese Basketball Association.

=== Return to Canton (2018) ===
On February 9, 2018, Jerrett re-signed with the Canton Charge of the NBA G League.

=== SeaHorses Mikawa (2018) ===
On August 23, 2018, Jerrett joined SeaHorses Mikawa of the Japanese B.League. On December 25, he left the team.

=== Igokea (2019) ===
On January 10, 2019, Jerrett joined Igokea for the remainder of the 2018–19 season.

=== ratiopharm Ulm (2019–2020) ===
On July 18, 2019, Jerrett signed two-year contract with ratiopharm Ulm of the German Basketball Bundesliga (BBL). He averaged 11.4 points and six rebounds per game.

=== Darüşşafaka (2020–2021) ===
On July 18, 2020, Jerrett signed with Darüşşafaka of the Basketball Super League. He was named Player of the Week on November 17, after recording a double-double of 29 points and 10 rebounds in a victory over Galatasaray S.K.

=== Avtador (2021) ===
On September 6, 2021, Jerrett signed with Avtodor of the VTB United League. He left the team after the 2022 Russian invasion of Ukraine.

=== Utsunomiya Brex (2022–present) ===
On December 10, 2022, Jerrett signed with Utsunomiya Brex of the Japanese B.League.

== NBA career statistics ==
Legend
GP	Games played	GS	Games started	MPG	Minutes per game
FG%	Field goal percentage	3P%	3-point field goal percentage	FT%	Free throw percentage
RPG	Rebounds per game	APG	Assists per game	SPG	Steals per game
BPG	Blocks per game	PPG	Points per game	**Bold**	Career high

=== Regular season ===
Year	Team	GP	GS	MPG	FG%	3P%	FT%	RPG	APG	SPG	BPG	PPG
2014–15	Oklahoma City	**5**	0	5.0	.176	**.077**	–	.8	.2	.0	**.4**	1.4
2014–15	Utah	3	0	**8.7**	**.444**	.000	**1.000**	**1.7**	**.4**	**.7**	.0	**3.0**
Career		8	0	6.4	.269	.067	.1000	1.1	.4	.3	.3	2.0
