= Kyle Bailey (basketball) =

American basketball player and coach

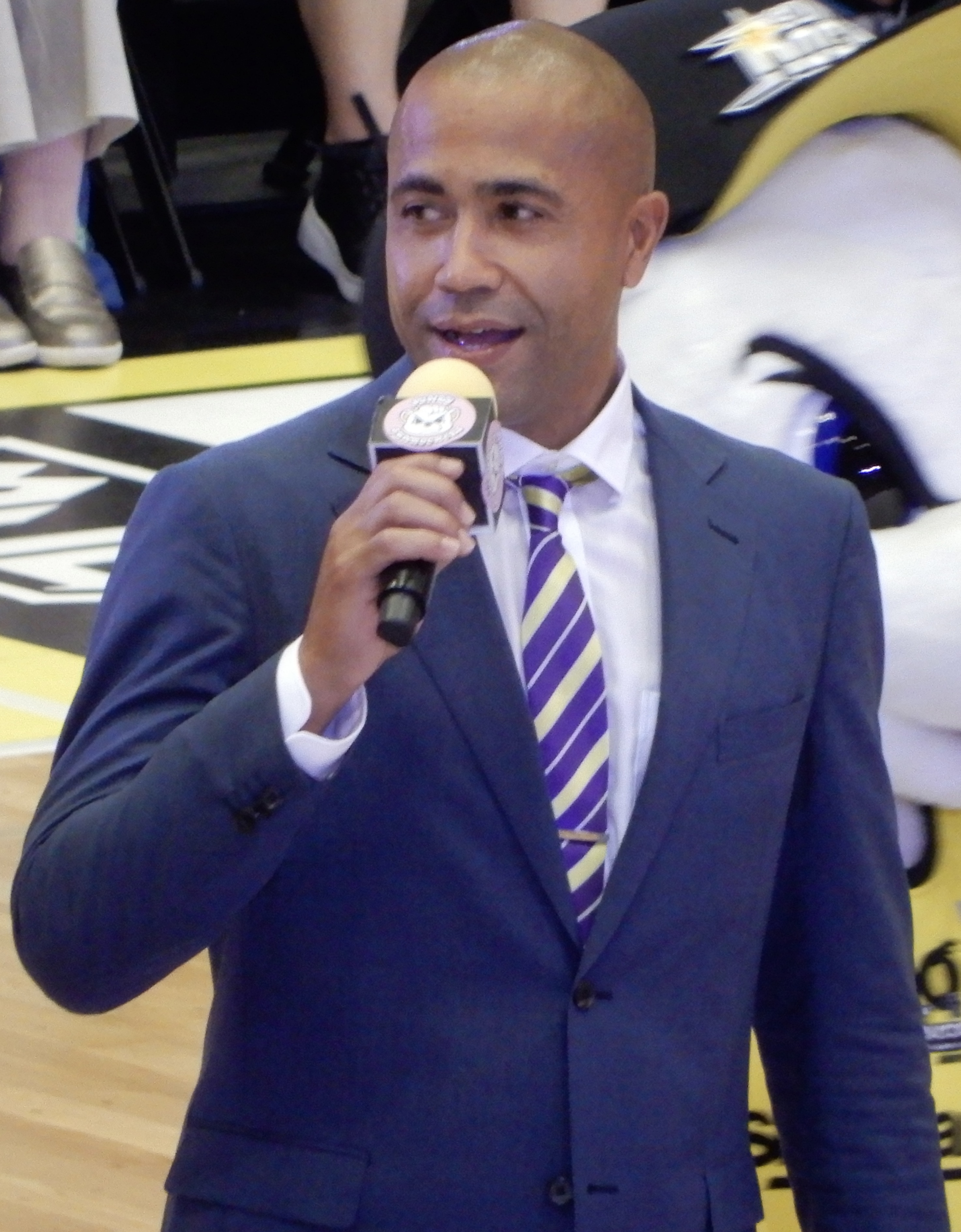
- Bailey in 2025

Personal information
- Born: March 10, 1982 (age 44) Fairbanks, Alaska, U.S.
- Listed height: 6 ft 2 in (1.88 m)
- Listed weight: 200 lb (91 kg)

Career information
- High school: Lathrop (Fairbanks, Alaska)
- College: Santa Clara (2000–2005)
- NBA draft: 2005: undrafted
- Playing career: 2005–2012
- Position: Shooting guard
- Coaching career: 2017–present

Career history

Playing
- 2005–2006: BK Rīga
- 2006–2007: BG Göttingen
- 2007–2008: ratiopharm Ulm
- 2008–2009: MEG Goettingen
- 2009–2010: EnBW Ludwigsburg
- 2010–2012: BG Göttingen

Coaching
- 2017–2022: Sun Rockers Shibuya (assistant)
- 2022-2023: Gunma Crane Thunders (assistant)
- 2023–2025: Sun Rockers Shibuya (assistant)
- 2025–2026: Sun Rockers Shibuya
- 2026–present: Guangzhou Loong Lions (assistant)

Career highlights
- Bundesliga North MVP (2007); First-team All-WCC (2002)

Kyle Jacob Bailey (born March 10, 1982) is an American former professional basketball player and basketball coach. He is an assistant coach for the Guangzhou Loong Lions in the Chinese Basketball Association.

== Biography ==
Born in Fairbanks, Alaska, Bailey began his active career during his studies at Santa Clara University where he set team records for most games (127), minutes played (3,897), and the single-season record for most three-pointers attempted with 198 (all since broken). He was also named to the 2002 All-West Coast Conference First Team.

After graduating in 2005, he was selected in the 2005 NBA Development League Draft by the Florida Flame, although he never played in a game for them. In 2006, he moved to Germany to BG Göttingen. That same year he received the award of the Most Valuable Player of the 2nd Basketball Bundesliga North.

== Coaching career ==
After serving 7 seasons as assistant coach for Sun Rockers Shibuya, Bailey took over as interim coach midway through the 2024-25 B.League season.

In May 2025 Bailey was announced as the head coach of Sun Rockers Shibuya for the 2025-26 B.League.

However after a 11-19 start to the season, Bailey was released shortly after.

In August 2026, Bailey joined the Guangzhou Loong Lions as an assistant coach.
