= Isaac Fotu =

New Zealand basketball player

No. 42 – Utsunomiya Brex
- Position: Power forward
- League: B.League

Personal information
- Born: 18 December 1993 (age 32) York, England
- Listed height: 2.03 m (6 ft 8 in)
- Listed weight: 104 kg (229 lb)

Career information
- High school: Rangitoto College (Auckland, New Zealand)
- College: Hawaii (2012–2014)
- NBA draft: 2015: undrafted
- Playing career: 2011–present

Career history
- 2011–2012: New Zealand Breakers
- 2014–2017: Zaragoza
- 2014–2015: →Manresa
- 2017–2019: ratiopharm Ulm
- 2019–2020: Universo Treviso
- 2020–2021: Reyer Venezia
- 2021–present: Utsunomiya Brex

Career highlights
- EASL champion (2026); 2× B.League champion (2022, 2025); NBL champion (2012); First-team All-Big West (2014); Big West co-Freshman of the Year (2013)

Isaac Mana Mei Langi Finau Fotu (born 18 December 1993) is a New Zealand professional basketball player for Utsunomiya Brex of the Japanese B.League. He also represents the New Zealand national team in international competition.

== Early life ==
Fotu was born in York, England, to a Tongan father and an English mother. He briefly lived in England alongside his two younger siblings, Ella and Dan, before the family moved to New Zealand when Fotu was seven.

As a teenager, Fotu attended Rangitoto College in Auckland and played club basketball for the North Harbour Basketball Association, leading the U19 boys squad to back-to-back national runner-up finishes. In 2011, he was named to the all-star five of the Nike All-Asia Camp in China, an invitation-only tournament for some of the best young high school players throughout Asia and Oceania.

On 4 July 2011, Fotu signed with the New Zealand Breakers as a non-contracted development player for the 2011–12 NBL season. Being non-contracted still allowed him to pursue opportunities in the American college system without jeopardising his amateur status. On 11 November 2011, he played his first and only game for the Breakers, appearing the final 46 seconds of the team's 81–63 loss to the Wollongong Hawks.

On 22 November 2011, Fotu signed a National Letter of Intent to play college basketball for the University of Hawaii. After the University of Hawaii suggested that he might contravene NCAA rules if he played for a professional team, Fotu did not play again for the Breakers, nor did he play for the Harbour Heat during the 2012 New Zealand NBL season despite signing with the club.

== College career ==
As a freshman at Hawaii in 2012–13, Fotu earned Big West co-Freshman of the Year honors and in doing so, became just the second UH player to earn league freshman of the year honors. He also earned Freshman All-American honors from CollegeInsider.com. In 32 games (18 starts), he averaged 10.1 points, 6.2 rebounds and 1.0 assists in 25.1 minutes per game.

As a sophomore in 2013–14, Fotu earned first-team All-Big West and second-team NABC All-District 9 honors, becoming just the 11th UH player ever to be named all-district. He also earned Academic All-Big West honors. On 25 January 25, 2014, he scored a career-high 30 points on 13-of-16 shooting in an overtime win over UC Irvine. In 31 games (all starts), he averaged 14.9 points and 6.1 rebounds in 30.8 minutes per game.

On 29 October 2014, Fotu was ruled ineligible to play in 2014–15 after an NCAA investigation revealed he received improper benefits as a student-athlete. He was told he could continue practicing with the team but could not participate in games. He subsequently announced on 3 November that he was leaving the program to pursue a professional contract overseas.

=== College statistics ===
Year	Team	GP	GS	MPG	FG%	3P%	FT%	RPG	APG	SPG	BPG	PPG
2012–13	Hawaii	32	18	25.1	.623	.000	.663	6.2	1.0	.2	.8	10.1
2013–14	Hawaii	31	31	30.8	.584	.125	.733	6.1	.7	.4	.8	14.9

== Professional career ==
On 12 November 2014, Fotu signed a three-year deal with CAI Zaragoza of the Liga ACB. Two weeks later, he was loaned to La Bruixa d'Or Manresa for the rest of the season. He went on to make his debut for Manresa on 29 November, recording two points and two rebounds in a loss to Joventut Badalona. The following game, on 7 December, he made his first start for Manresa, recording 16 points and 6 rebounds in a loss to Iberostar Tenerife. In 26 games for Manresa in 2014–15, he averaged 10.7 points and 4.0 rebounds per game.

Fotu returned to Zaragoza for the 2015–16 season, making his debut for the club on 11 October 2015. On 3 April 2016, he had a 16-point game against CB Estudiantes, and on 11 May, he had an 18-point game against Valencia BC.

On 22 July 2019, he has signed with Universo Treviso of the Italian Lega Basket Serie A.

On 5 July 2020, he has signed with Reyer Venezia of the Italian Lega Basket Serie A (LBA). Fotu parted ways with the team on 28 June 2021.

On 20 July 2021, Fotu moves to Japan in the B.League signing with Utsunomiya Brex.

== National team career ==
Fotu, at the age of just 17 years, became the youngest player to represent the Tall Blacks when he made his international debut in August 2011 at the Stanković Cup in Guangzhou, China where he helped them win the tournament. The following month, he helped New Zealand win the inaugural FIBA 3x3 World Youth Championship in Italy.

Fotu competed for the Tall Blacks at the 2014 FIBA Basketball World Cup in Spain where he averaged 9.5 points and 4.5 rebounds in six games.

After helping lead the Tall Blacks to the 2015 Stanković Cup title, Fotu played in the two-game FIBA Oceania Championship series against Australia in mid-August. New Zealand were defeated 2–0 as Fotu recorded a total of 18 points and 18 rebounds over the two games.

== Personal life ==
Fotu is the son of Manu and Jenny Fotu, both of whom reside in Torbay, Auckland. His father played professional rugby in England. He also has two younger brothers and two younger sisters. His sister Ella and brother Dan have represented the Tall Ferns and Tall Blacks respectively.

Fotu holds dual New Zealand-British nationality.
