= Kanseki Stadium Tochigi =

Stadium in Utsunomiya, Tochigi, Japan

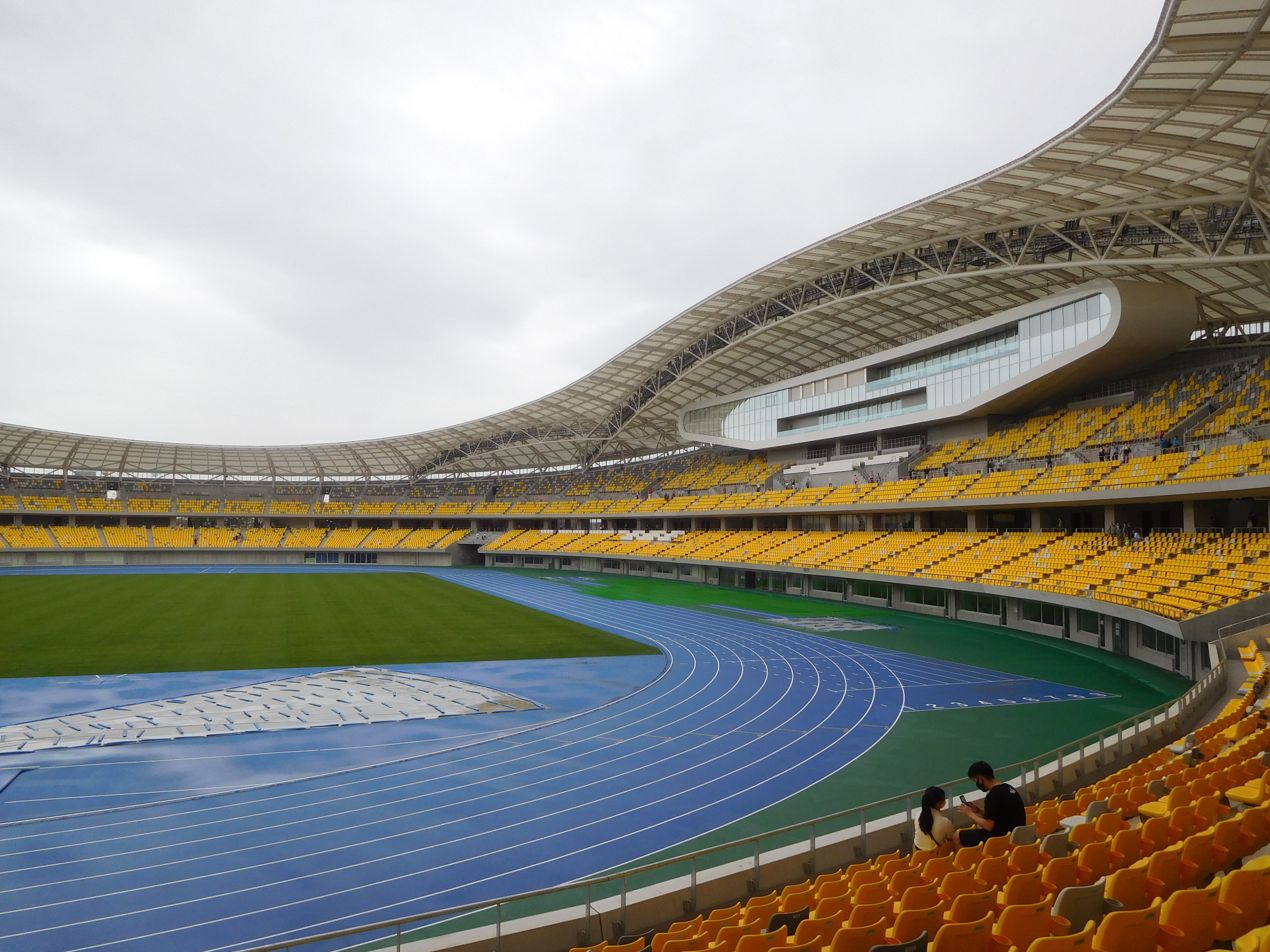
- Interactive map of Kanseki Stadium Tochigi
- Full name: Tochigi Prefectural Sports Park Athletic Field
- Location: Utsunomiya, Japan
- Coordinates: 36°30′52″N 139°51′27″E
- Owner: Tochigi Prefecture
- Capacity: 25,244

Construction
- Opened: July 23, 2020
- Cost: JPY 19.4 billion
- General contractor: Kajima

Tenant
- Tochigi SC

Kanseki Stadium Tochigi (カンセキスタジアムとちぎ) is a multi-purpose stadium at the Tochigi Prefectural General Sports Park in Utsunomiya, Tochigi, Japan. The stadium was originally opened in 2020 and has a capacity of 25,244 spectators.

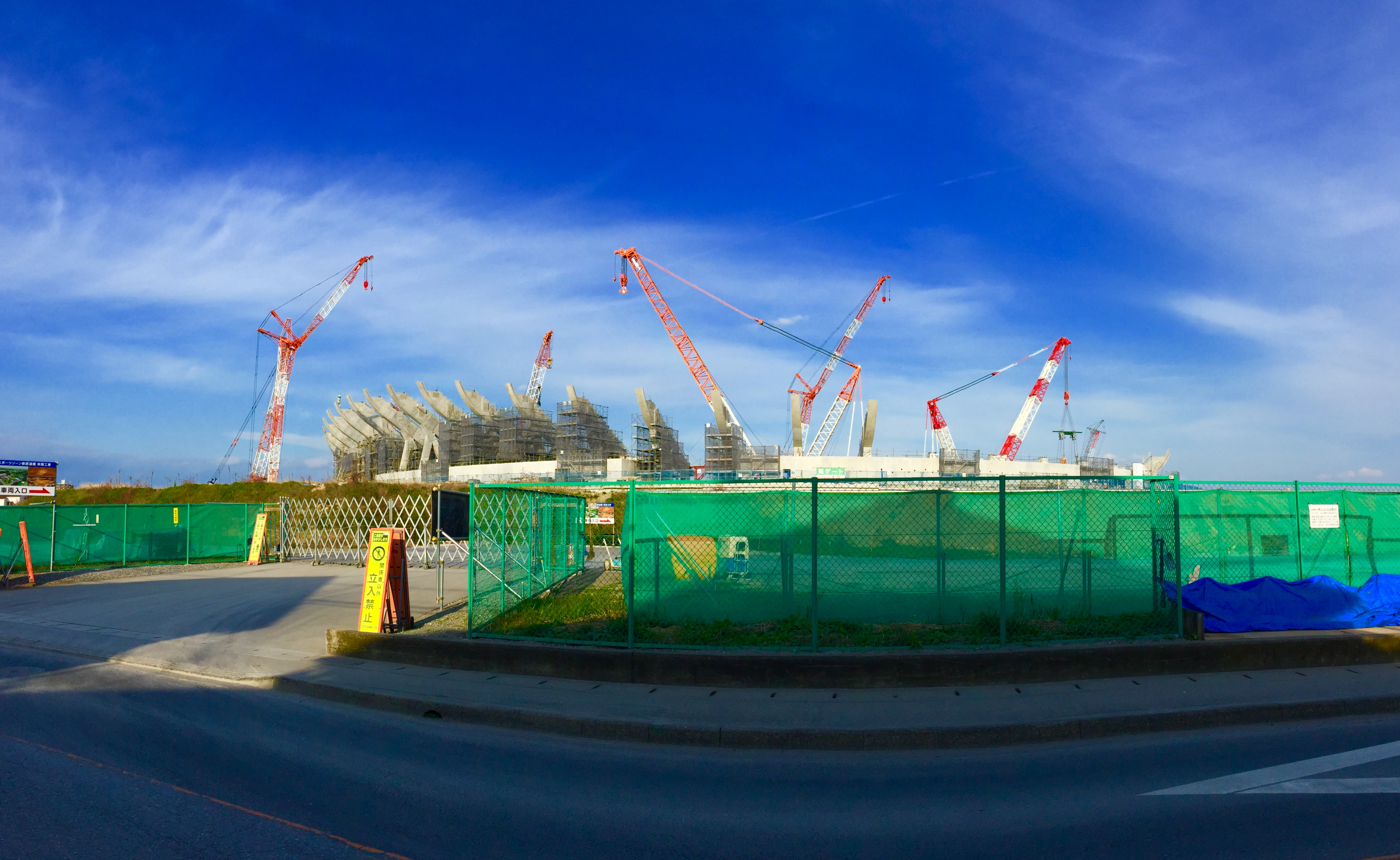
Under construction in November 2018
