= Zack Baranski =

Japanese-born American basketball player

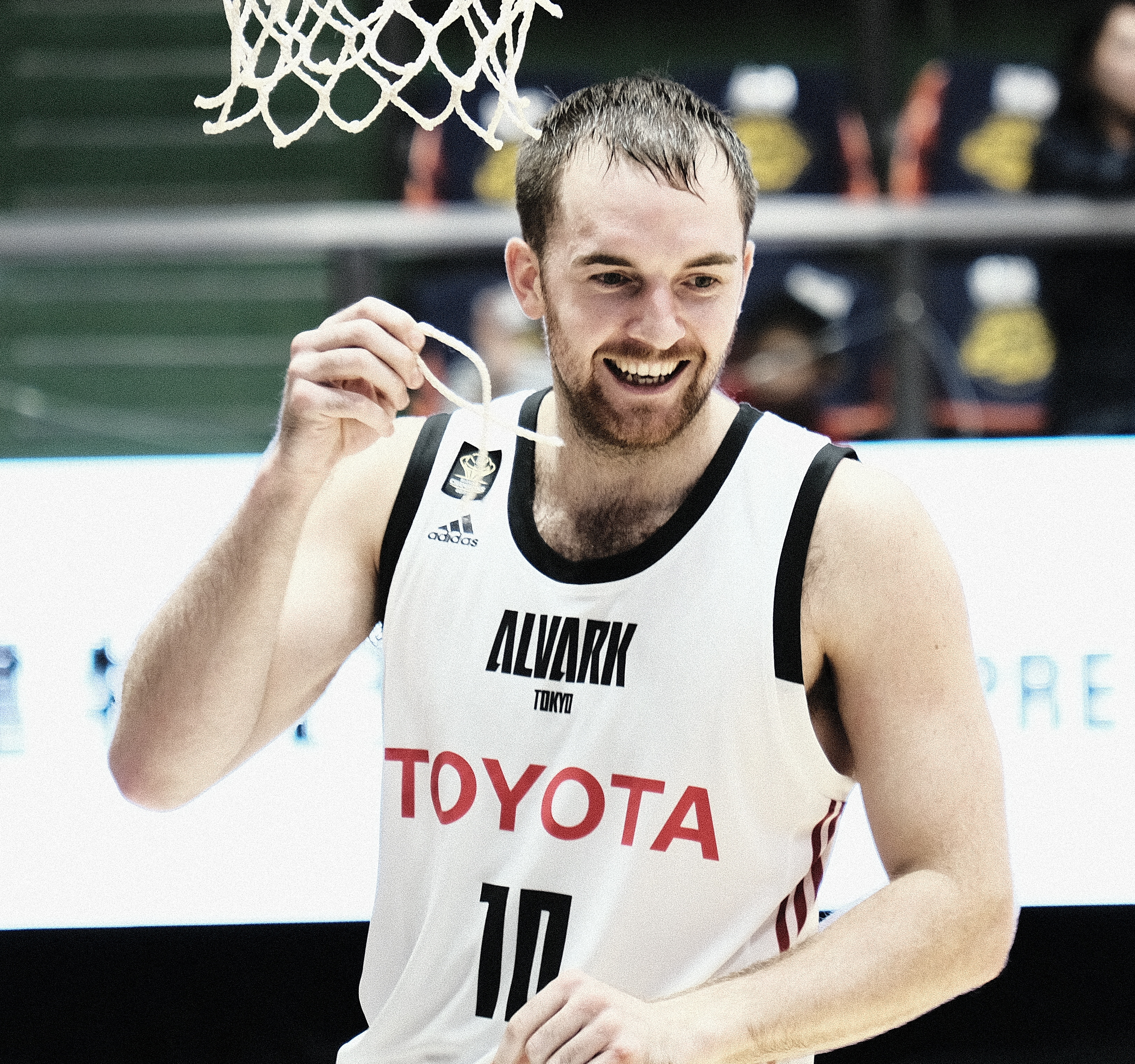

No. 10 – Alvark Tokyo
- Position: Small forward
- League: B.League

Personal information
- Born: December 18, 1992 (age 33) Nasu, Tochigi, Japan
- Listed height: 6 ft 4 in (1.93 m)
- Listed weight: 207 lb (94 kg)

Career information
- High school: Tokai University#3 High (Chino, Nagano)
- College: Tokai University
- Playing career: 2015–present

Career history
- 2015–present: Alvark Tokyo
Medals
Men's basketball
Representing Japan
FIBA Asia Champions Cup
Silver medal – second place	2018 Thailand	Team
Gold medal – first place	2019 Thailand	Team

Zack Alan Baranski (born December 18, 1992), is an American professional basketball player for Alvark Tokyo of the Japanese B.League.

== Career statistics ==
Legend
GP	Games played	GS	Games started	MPG	Minutes per game
FG%	Field goal percentage	3P%	3-point field goal percentage	FT%	Free throw percentage
RPG	Rebounds per game	APG	Assists per game	SPG	Steals per game
BPG	Blocks per game	PPG	Points per game	**Bold**	Career high

Year	Team	GP	GS	MPG	FG%	3P%	FT%	RPG	APG	SPG	BPG	PPG
2014–15	Toyota	12	–	7.2	.571	.167	.571	1.3	0.1	0.7	0.0	3.1
2015–16	Toyota	43	8	12.3	.414	.366	.500	2.2	0.6	0.4	0.1	5.2
2016–17	A Tokyo	60	12	22.1	.426	.326	.594	3.9	1.0	0.8	3.4	9.1
2017–18	A Tokyo	57	8	18.7	.402	.394	.711	2.4	1.2	0.9	0.1	5.7

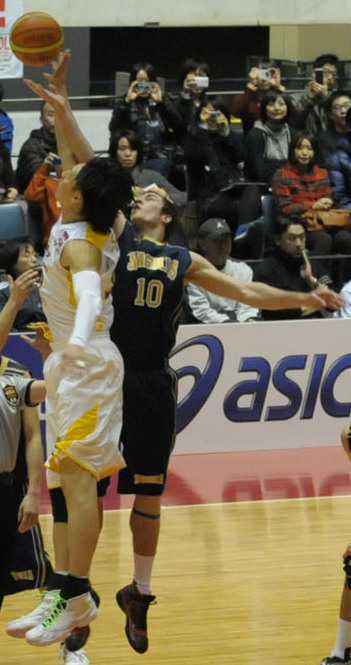
Baranski #10
