= Alexandre Gavrilovic =

French-Serbian professional basketball player

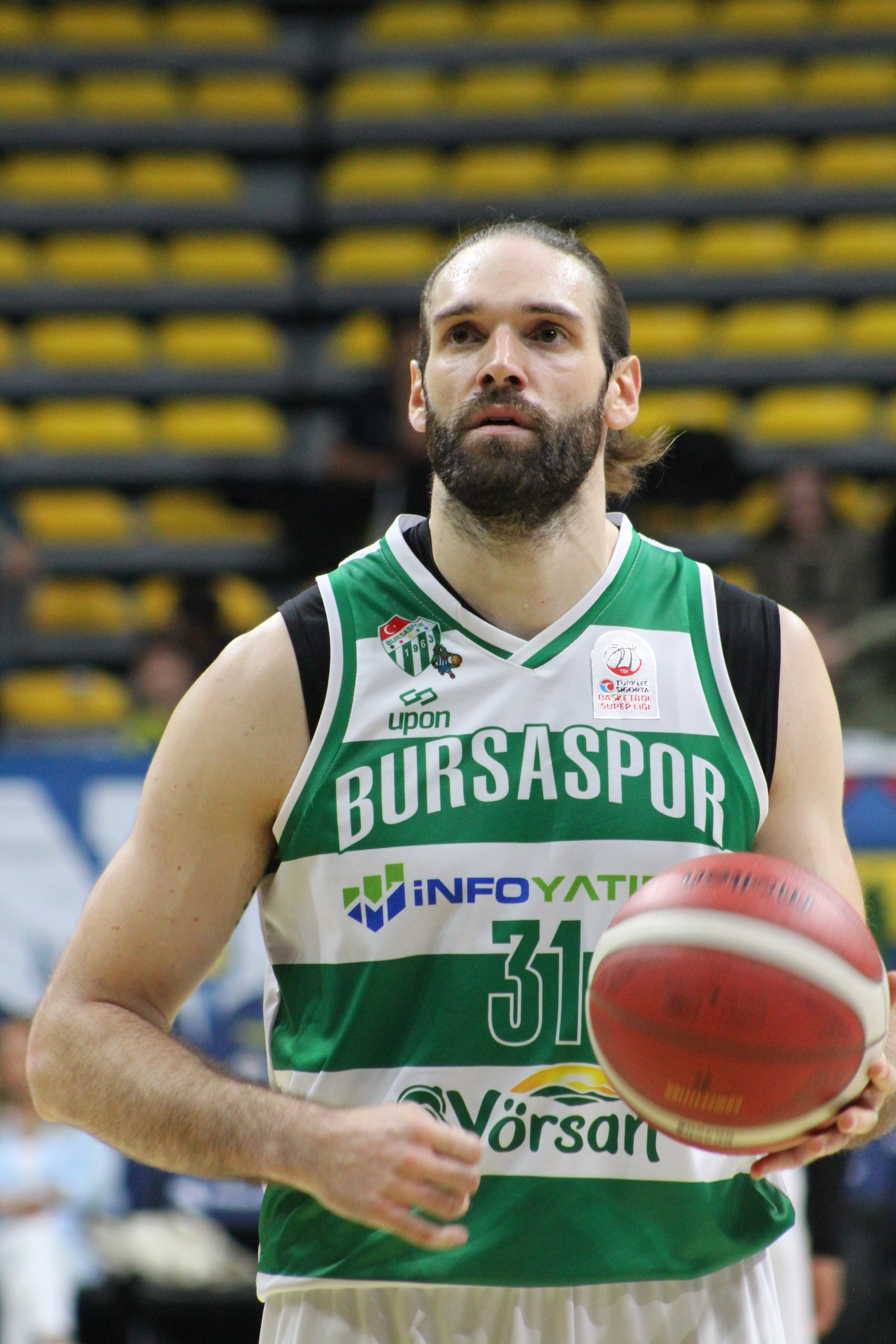

No. 31 – Saint-Quentin
- Position: Center
- League: LNB Élite

Personal information
- Born: 20 November 1991 (age 34) Strasbourg, France
- Listed height: 2.08 m (6 ft 10 in)
- Listed weight: 110 kg (243 lb)

Career information
- College: Dayton (2011–2014); Towson (2014–2015)
- NBA draft: 2015: undrafted
- Playing career: 2015–present

Career history
- 2015–2017: Chorale Roanne
- 2017–2018: Hermine Nantes
- 2018: ALM Évreux
- 2018–2019: Balkan
- 2019–2020: BC Minsk
- 2020–2021: Nizhny Novgorod
- 2021–2022: Oradea
- 2022–2023: Mons-Hainaut
- 2023–2024: Mornar Bar
- 2024–2025: Bursaspor
- 2025–2026: Hong Kong Eastern
- 2026: Büyükçekmece
- 2026–present: Saint-Quentin

Alexandre Gavrilovic (fr. Alexandre Vladimir Źivko Gavrilovic; born 25 November 1991) is a French-Serbian professional basketball player for Saint-Quentin of the LNB Élite. Born in Strasbourg, he started his professional career in Chorale Roanne, France, before playing college basketball for the Dayton Flyers and the Towson Tigers.

Gavrilovic was named to the All-FIBA Europe Cup Second Team and All-Europeans First Team in 2019 when he played for Bulgarian team Balkan Botevgrad. He has also played for teams in the VTB United League, and the ABA League. Gavrilovic was part of the France u20 national team which won gold medal at the European Championship in 2010. He plays the center position.

== Early life ==
Alex Gavrilovic was born in the city of Strasbourg in France. He grew up in Germany and Switzerland before returning to Strasbourg in 2000. He started playing basketball in 2006 by integrating to youth team of SIG Strasbourg. At the age of 17, he received a scholarship to play at the IMG Academies in Bradenton, Florida. In 2010, he signed a National Letter of Intent (NLI) committing to Providence College but was ruled ineligible for academic reasons. He returned to IMG Academies for a second year and committed to the University of Dayton in 2011. He played three seasons with the Dayton Flyers and appeared in 67 games averaging 3.0 points, 1.9 rebounds, in 10.0 minutes per game. After his junior year, he transferred to Towson University where he averaged 5.4 points, 4.0 rebounds, in 17.3 minutes per game.

== Professional career ==
=== Chorale de Roanne (2015–2017) ===
In June 2015, Gavrilovic signed a two-year contract with Chorale de Roanne in ProB, France. On 13 November 2015 he recorded a season-high 22 points in his first career and season win against SOM Boulogne. During his first season he averaged 6.5 points, 4.5 rebounds, in 15.6 minutes per game.

During his second season, he averaged 8.1 points, 4.1 rebounds, in 18.5 minutes per game. In 2017, he won the LNB ProB Disneyland Leaders Cup.

=== Hermine Nantes / ALM Evreux (2017–2018) ===
Gavrilovic started the season with Hermine Nantes where he recorder a season-high 24 points against ADA Blois. He left the team in February 2018 to join ALM Évreux where he averaged 7.7 points, 3.0 rebounds, in 15.2 minutes per game.

=== Balkan Botevgrad (2018–2019) ===
Gavrilovic signed with Balkan Botevgrad on 26 October 2018 after spending the preseason with Antibes Sharks. He averaged 10.2 points, 7.7 rebounds, in 23.1 minutes per game in the Bulgarian league. He also discovered the FIBA Europe Cup where he averaged 13.5 points, 8.4 rebounds, in 27.8 minutes per game. He was named to the All-FIBA Europe Cup Second Team and All-Europeans First Team in 2019.

=== Tsmoki Minsk (2019–2020) ===
Gavrilovic discovered the VTB League in 2019 when he joined Tsmoki Minsk. He recorded he season-high 20 points against Khimki Moscow Region on 24 November 2019, and season-high 30 efficiency against CSKA Moscow on 28 December 2019. Gavrilovic averaged 12.2 points, 5.6 rebounds, in 24.3 minutes per game. After losing against Kauhajoki Karhu Basket in the FIBA Champions League qualification round, averaging 14.5 points and 5.0, in 26.0 minutes in two games, Gavrilovic played his second FIBA Europe Cup season with Tsmoki Minsk where he averaged 13.9 points, 6.1 rebounds, in 23.3 minutes per game with a season-high 25 points against Kyiv Basket on 6 November 2019.

=== Nizhny Novgorod (2020–2021) ===
Gavrilovic signed with another VTB League team, Nizhny Novgorod. He averaged 6.2 points, 2.9 rebounds, in 15.3 minutes per game in the VTB League and 7.2 points, 2.9 rebounds, 12.2 minutes per game in FIBA Champions League with a season-high 21 points against Casademont Zaragoza on 11 November 2020.

=== CSM CSU Oradea (2021–2022) ===
Gavrilovic signed with CSM CSU Oradea in July 2021 and discovered the Romanian basketball league. He also played his third season in FIBA Europe Cup. Gavrilovic averaged 9.8 points, 3.9 rebounds, in. 19.9 minutes per game in the Romanian league and 9.4 points, 4.6 rebounds, in 21.9 minutes per game in FIBA Europe Cup.

=== Belfius Mons Hainaut (2022–2023) ===
Gavrilovic spend the 2022–2023 season in Mons, Belgium. He averaged 12.4 points, 4.6 rebounds, in 23.3 minutes per game in the BNXT League. He recorded a career-high 26 points on 4 March 2023. Also, he recorded a career-high efficiency of 36 against Den Helder Suns on 4 March 2023.

=== Mornar-Barsko Zlato Bar (2023–2024) ===
Gavrilovic signed with Mornar-Barsko Zlato Bar, ABA League, on 15 August 2023. He started his season with a game against KK Partizan Belgrade in Stark Arena, Belgrade and scored 19 points in 26 minutes. On 30 October 2023, Gavrilovic recorded a double-double 14 points and 11 rebounds in his first season win against KK Krka Novo Mesto.

=== Bursaspor (2024–2025) ===
On 5 April 2024, he signed with Bursaspor Basketbol of the Basketbol Süper Ligi (BSL). On 7 July 2024, he extended his contract one more year with Bursaspor.

=== Hong Kong Eastern (2025) ===
On October 14, 2025, he signed with Hong Kong Eastern of the Hong Kong A1.

=== Büyükçekmece (2026) ===
On February 6, 2026, he signed with ONVO Büyükçekmece of the Basketbol Süper Ligi (BSL).

=== Saint-Quentin (2026–present) ===
On July 21, 2026, he signed with Saint-Quentin Basket-Ball of the French LNB Élite.

== Personal life ==
Gavrilovic was born in Strasbourg, France. He lived in Bonn, Germany for 6 years, where his mother worked at the French Embassy. Also, Gavrilovic's family have been living in Zurich and Bern.

Alex got married on 15 February 2022 in Strasbourg to Daria Novikova from Belarus.
