= Alex Kirk =

American basketball player (born 1991)

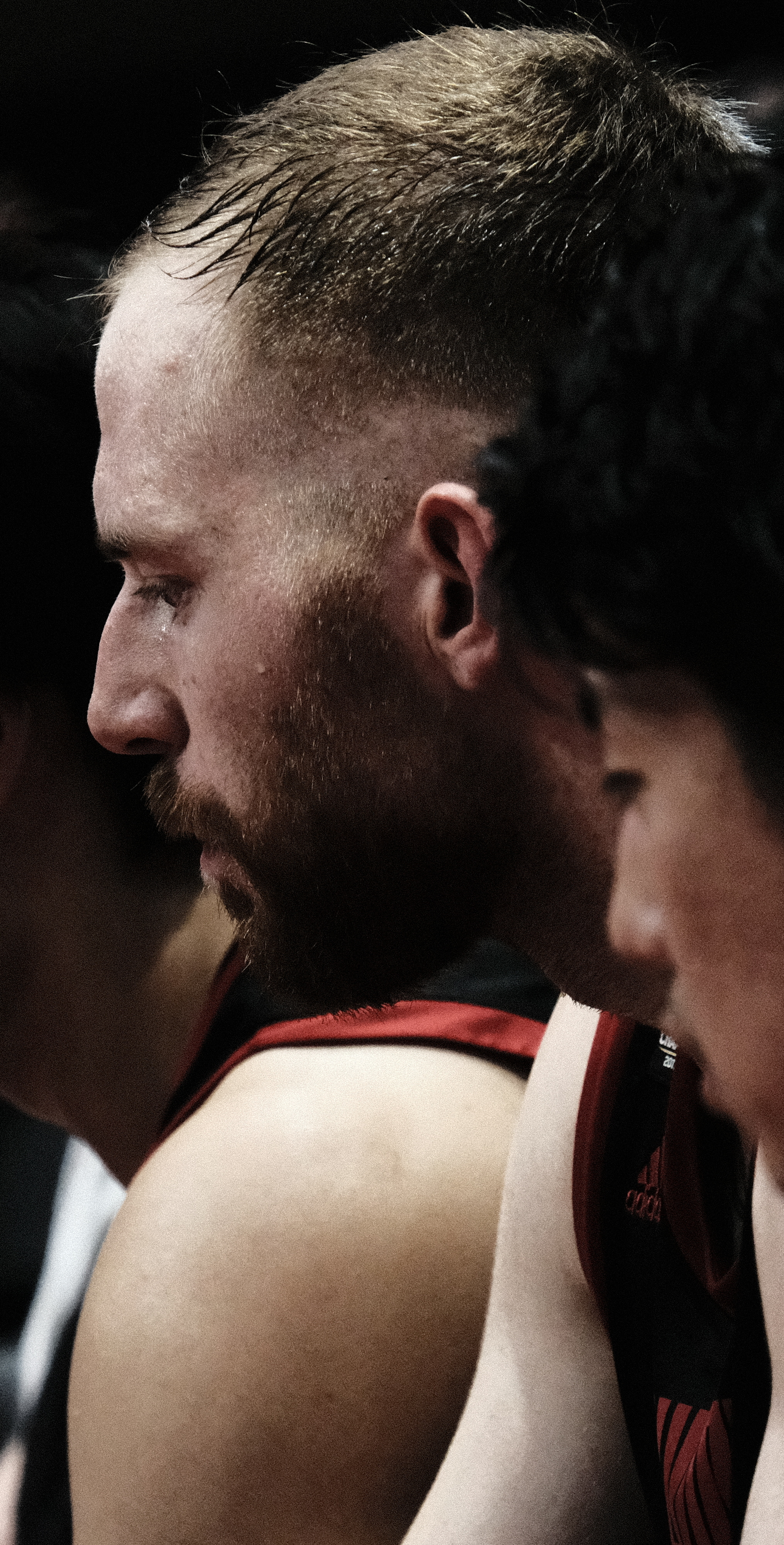
- Kirk in 2018 with Alvark Tokyo

No. 53 – Kawasaki Brave Thunders
- Position: Center
- League: B.League

Personal information
- Born: November 14, 1991 (age 35) Los Alamos, New Mexico, U.S.
- Listed height: 6 ft 11 in (2.11 m)
- Listed weight: 252 lb (114 kg)

Career information
- High school: Los Alamos (Los Alamos, New Mexico)
- College: New Mexico (2010–2014)
- NBA draft: 2014: undrafted
- Playing career: 2014–present

Career history
- 2014–2015: Cleveland Cavaliers
- 2014: →Canton Charge
- 2015: Canton Charge
- 2015–2016: Pistoia Basket 2000
- 2016: Guangzhou Long-Lions
- 2017: Anadolu Efes
- 2017–2023: Alvark Tokyo
- 2023–2026: Ryukyu Golden Kings
- 2026–present: Kawasaki Brave Thunders

Career highlights
- 2× B.League champion (2018, 2019); FIBA Asia Champions Cup champion (2019); FIBA Asia Champions Cup MVP (2019); Second-team All-MWC (2013); 2× MWC All-Defensive team (2013, 2014)
- Stats at NBA.com
- Stats at Basketball Reference
Medals
Men's basketball
Representing Japan
Asian Games
Silver medal – second place	2026 Aichi–Nagoya	Team
FIBA Asia Champions Cup
Silver medal – second place	2018 Thailand	Team
Gold medal – first place	2019 Thailand	Team

Alex Ryan Kirk (born November 14, 1991) is an American-born Japanese professional basketball player for the Kawasaki Brave Thunders of the Japanese B.League. He played college basketball for the University of New Mexico.

== College career ==
Kirk, a 7'0" center, played at Los Alamos High School in Los Alamos, New Mexico. He came to the University of New Mexico in 2010, averaging 4.7 points and 3.7 rebounds per game in the 2010–11 season. In the offseason, Kirk underwent back surgery for a herniated disc and subsequently redshirted the 2011–12 season. Kirk bounced back as a redshirt sophomore, averaging 12.1 points, 8.1 rebounds and 1.8 blocked shots per game. At the conclusion of the season, Kirk was named second team All-Mountain West Conference and a member of the league's All-Defensive team.

In the summer of 2013, Kirk was named to the United States' team for the 2013 Summer Universiade. He averaged 3.7 points and 4.6 rebounds as the team finished in ninth place.

In 2013–14, Kirk increased his numbers to 13.2 points, 8.7 rebounds and 2.7 blocks per game. He was named third team All-MWC and repeated as a member of the All-Defensive team.

In April 2014, Kirk declared for the NBA draft, foregoing his final year of college eligibility.

== Professional career ==
=== Cleveland Cavaliers ===
After going undrafted in the 2014 NBA draft, Kirk joined the Cleveland Cavaliers for the 2014 NBA Summer League. On August 11, 2014, he signed with the Cavaliers. During his rookie season with the Cavaliers, he had multiple assignments with the Canton Charge of the NBA Development League.

On January 5, 2015, Kirk was traded to the New York Knicks in a three-team trade that also involved the Oklahoma City Thunder. Two days later, he was waived by the Knicks.

=== Canton Charge ===
On January 10, 2015, Kirk was acquired by the Canton Charge. In 46 games for the Charge in 2014–15, he averaged 12.5 points, 6.5 rebounds, 1.1 assists and 1.1 blocks per game.

=== Pistoia Basket 2000 ===
On August 15, 2015, Kirk signed with Pistoia Basket 2000 of the Italian Serie A for the 2015–16 season. Kirk averaged 16.3 points and 7.6 rebounds per game for Pistoia, which reached the Serie A playoffs before being eliminated in the first round by Scandone Avellino.

=== Guangzhou Long-Lions ===
In July 2016, Kirk played for the San Antonio Spurs in the Utah session of the 2016 NBA Summer League. He then played for the Toronto Raptors in the Las Vegas session.

On July 29, 2016, Kirk signed to play for the Guangzhou Long-Lions of the Chinese Basketball Association for the 2016–17 season. On November 15, he was released by Guangzhou.

=== Anadolu Efes ===
On January 16, 2017, Kirk signed with Turkish club Anadolu Efes for the rest of the season.

=== Alvark Tokyo ===
On July 26, 2017, Kirk signed with Alvark Tokyo of the Japan B League.

Alvark Tokyo won the 2017–18 B League championship, and Kirk led the team, averaging 16.2 points and 8.8 rebounds per game for the season.

In the summer of 2017, Kirk played in The Basketball Tournament on ESPN for The Stickmen. He competed for the $2 million prize, and for The Stickmen, he averaged 6.5 points per game. Kirk helped take The Stickmen to the second round of the tournament, where they then lost to Team Challenge ALS 87–73. In TBT 2018, he played for Eberlein Drive. Eberlein Drive made it to the championship game, where they lost to Overseas Elite.

== NBA career statistics ==
Legend
GP	Games played	GS	Games started	MPG	Minutes per game
FG%	Field goal percentage	3P%	3-point field goal percentage	FT%	Free throw percentage
RPG	Rebounds per game	APG	Assists per game	SPG	Steals per game
BPG	Blocks per game	PPG	Points per game	**Bold**	Career high

=== Regular season ===
Year	Team	GP	GS	MPG	FG%	3P%	FT%	RPG	APG	SPG	BPG	PPG
2014–15	Cleveland	5	0	2.8	.250	.000	1.000	.2	.2	.0	.0	.8
Career		5	0	2.8	.250	.000	1.000	.2	.2	.0	.0	.8

== International career statistics ==
Year	Team	GP	GS	MPG	FG%	3P%	FT%	RPG	APG	SPG	BPG	PPG
2017–18	A Tokyo	60	60	26.1	.606	.275	.773	8.9	.9	.5	1.2	16.2
