= Ryan Rossiter =

American basketball player (born 1989)

Ryan Rossiter ライアン・ロシター
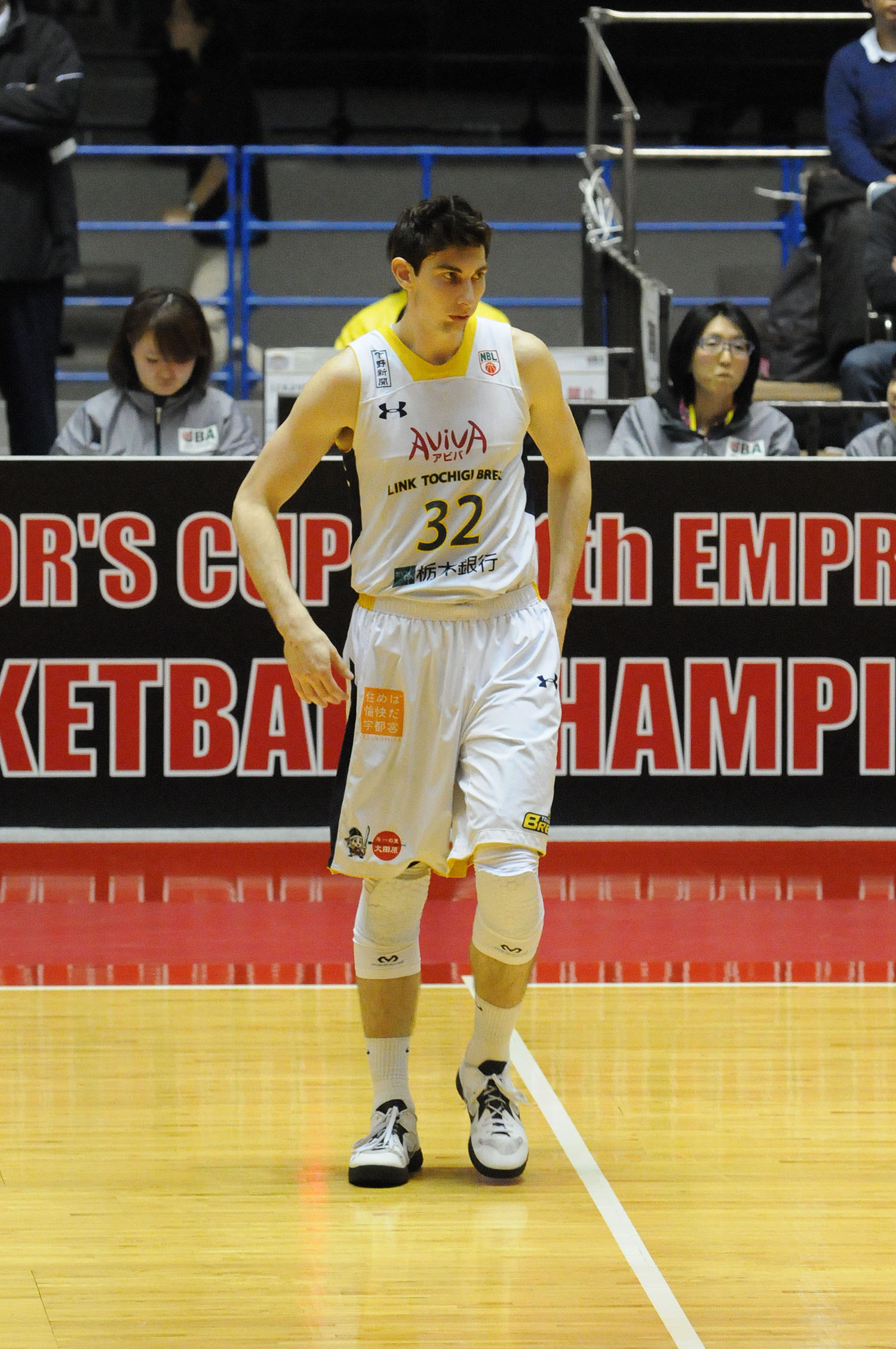

No. 22 – Alvark Tokyo
- Position: Power forward
- League: B.League

Personal information
- Born: September 14, 1989 (age 37) Staten Island, New York, U.S.
- Listed height: 6 ft 9 in (2.06 m)
- Listed weight: 255 lb (116 kg)

Career information
- High school: Monsignor Farrell (Staten Island, New York)
- College: Siena (2007–2011)
- NBA draft: 2011: undrafted
- Playing career: 2011–present

Career history
- 2011–2012: Denain ASC Voltaire
- 2012–2013: Canton Charge
- 2013–2021: Link Tochigi Brex / Utsunomiya Brex
- 2014: Chongqing Fly Dragons
- 2021–present: Alvark Tokyo

Career highlights
- B.League First Team (2020); B.League Rebound leader (2016); MAAC Player of the Year (2011); 2× First-team All-MAAC (2010, 2011)

Ryan Francis Rossiter (born September 14, 1989) is a US-born Japanese professional basketball power forward for the Alvark Tokyo of the B.League. Rossiter was named Metro Atlantic Athletic Conference player of the year and an All-American as a senior at Siena College in 2010–11.

== College career ==
Rossiter, a 6'9" big man out of Monsignor Farrell High School in Staten Island, New York, played college basketball at Siena College. Rossiter showed signs of potential as a freshman, starting 11 games as the Saints made the 2008 NCAA tournament. As a sophomore, he started all 34 games and averaged 10.0 points and 7.9 rebounds per game as the Saints made another NCAA tournament appearance.

As a junior Rossiter broke out, averaging 13.8 points and 11.1 rebounds per game and leading the conference in rebounding and field goal percentage (.571). Rossiter was named first team all-conference as the Saints won their third straight MAAC title and NCAA appearance. As a senior, Rossiter improved again. He averaged 18.7 points and 13.2 rebounds per game (placing him second nationally in rebounds per game to Morehead State's Kenneth Faried). Rossiter was named MAAC player of the year and an honorable mention Associated Press All-American. Rossiter graduated as Siena's all-time leading rebounder with 1,151 in his four years. He finished with 1,457 points and 167 blocked shots (third in school history).

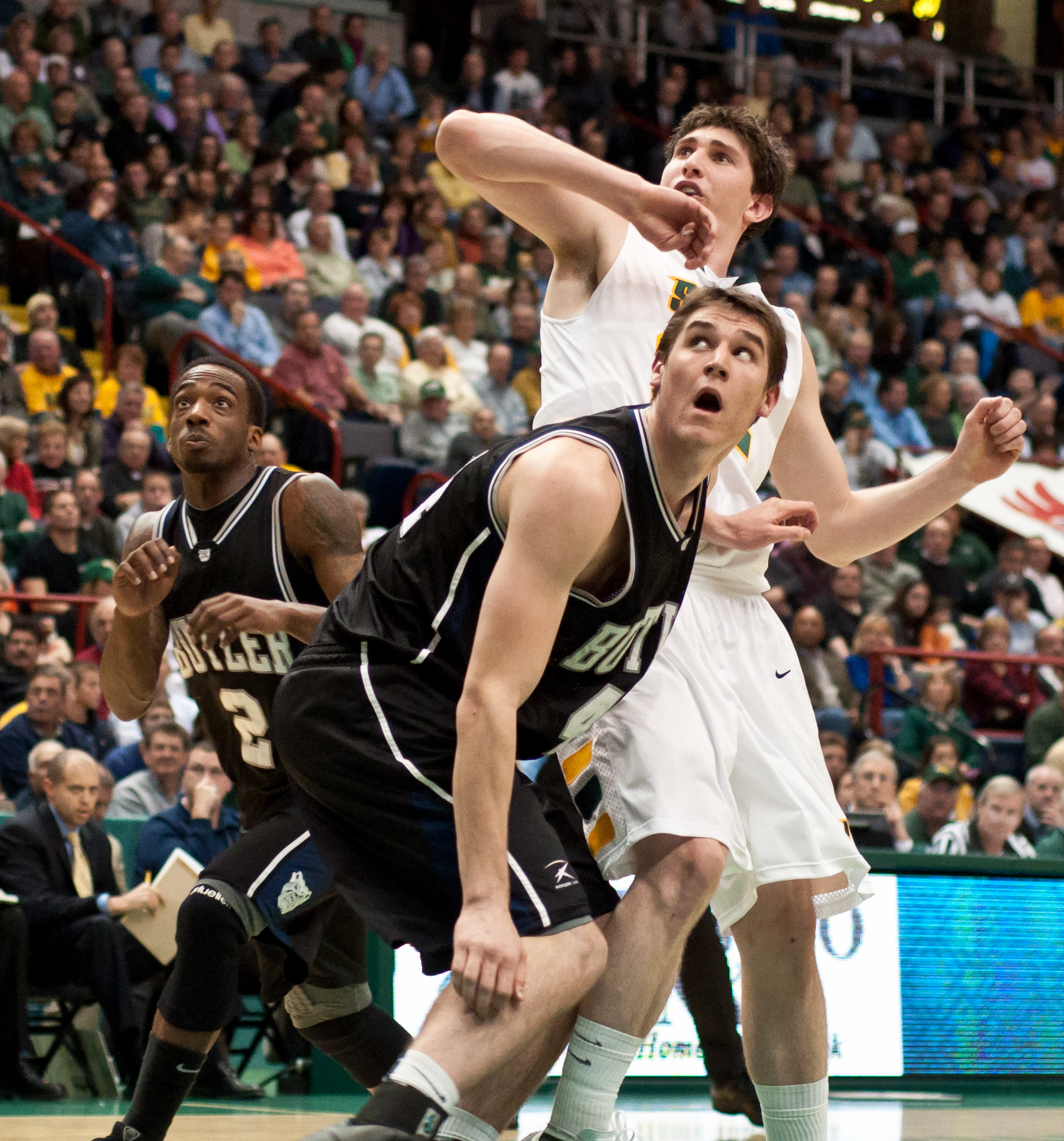
Butler's Andrew Smith and Siena's Ryan Rossiter both try to anticipate the rebound, as Butler's Shawn Vanzant closes in from behind. Photo taken November 23, 2010.

== Professional career ==
After the completion of his college career, Rossiter was not selected in the 2011 NBA draft. He signed with Denain ASC Voltaire of the French LNB Pro B in August 2011. For the season, Rossiter averaged 13.8 points and 9.7 rebounds per game.

In 2012, Rossiter made the roster of the Canton Charge of the NBA Development League.

On August 21, 2013, Rossiter signed with Link Tochigi Brex of the National Basketball League in Japan. He won the National Basketball League's MVP Trophy for the month of December 2013, a month in which he averaged 24.1 points per game and 13.1 rebounds per game. On June 12, 2014, he re-signed with Link Tochigi Brex. In July 2014, he played for Chongqing Fly Dragons of National Basketball League In China. On August 20, 2015, he re-signed with Link Tochigi Brex. On June 30, 2016, he re-signed with Link Tochigi Brex. During the 2017 B.League Semifinals, He hit a game winning layup with 2 seconds remaining to send his team to the finals, which they then won. On July 14, 2017, he re-signed with Link Tochigi Brex. On July 12, 2018, he re-signed with Link Tochigi Brex. On June 7, 2019, he re-signed with Link Tochigi Brex. In December 2019, he became Japanese citizen, became naturalised player in B.League. On June 8, 2020, he re-signed with Utsunomiya Brex.

On June 21, 2021, Rossiter signed with Alvark Tokyo of the B.League. On June 22, 2022, he re-signed with Alvark Tokyo. On June 16, 2023, he re-signed with Alvark Tokyo. On June 12, 2024, he re-signed with Alvark Tokyo.

== The Basketball Tournament ==
Ryan Rossiter played for Saints Alive in the 2018 edition of The Basketball Tournament. He scored 26 points and had 17 rebounds in the team's first-round loss to Team Fancy.

== Career statistics ==
Legend
GP	Games played	GS	Games started	MPG	Minutes per game
FG%	Field goal percentage	3P%	3-point field goal percentage	FT%	Free throw percentage
RPG	Rebounds per game	APG	Assists per game	SPG	Steals per game
BPG	Blocks per game	PPG	Points per game	**Bold**	Career high

†	Denotes seasons in which Rossiter won an championship
*	Led the league

Year	Team	GP	GS	MPG	FG%	3P%	FT%	RPG	APG	SPG	BPG	PPG
2013–14	Tochigi	54	54	32.9	.580	.306	.737	11.8	1.8	0.9	1.1	21.3
2014–15	Tochigi	53	52	33.5	.538	.500	.645	13.3	3.1	1.1	1.1	19.9
2015–16	Tochigi	47	47	35.7	.552	.231	.527	12.6	3.1	1.9	0.9	23.7
2016-17†	Tochigi	59	59	30.7	.507	.284	.445	13.3*	3.2	1.5	0.8	17.3
2017–18	Tochigi	57	56	28.3	.465	.339	.426	10.2	4.4	1.2	0.3	13.5
