= Alvark Tokyo =

Professional basketball team in Tokyo, Japan

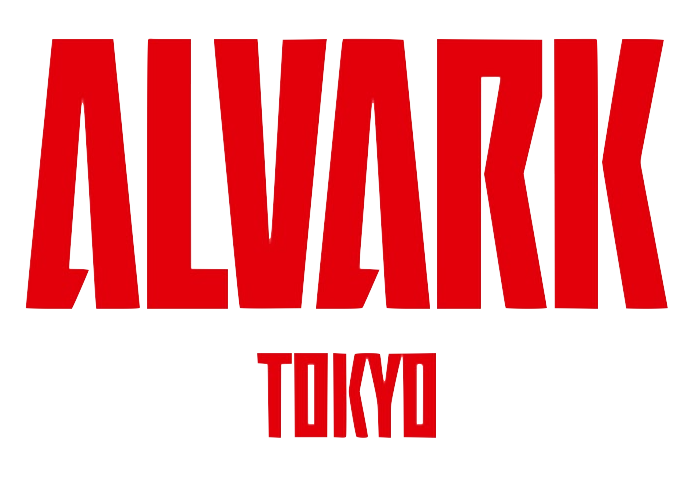
- Leagues: B.League
- Founded: 1948; 78 years ago
- History: Toyota Pacers; 1948–2000; Toyota Alvark; 2000–2016; Alvark Tokyo; 2016–present
- Arena: Toyota Arena Tokyo
- Team colors: Black, White, and Red
- Main sponsor: Toyota
- Head coach: Dainius Adomaitis
- Championships: 3 JBL Super League; 1 Japan Basketball League; 2 B.League; 1 FIBA Asia Champions Cup
- Website: https://www.alvark-tokyo.jp/
Home	Away	3rd

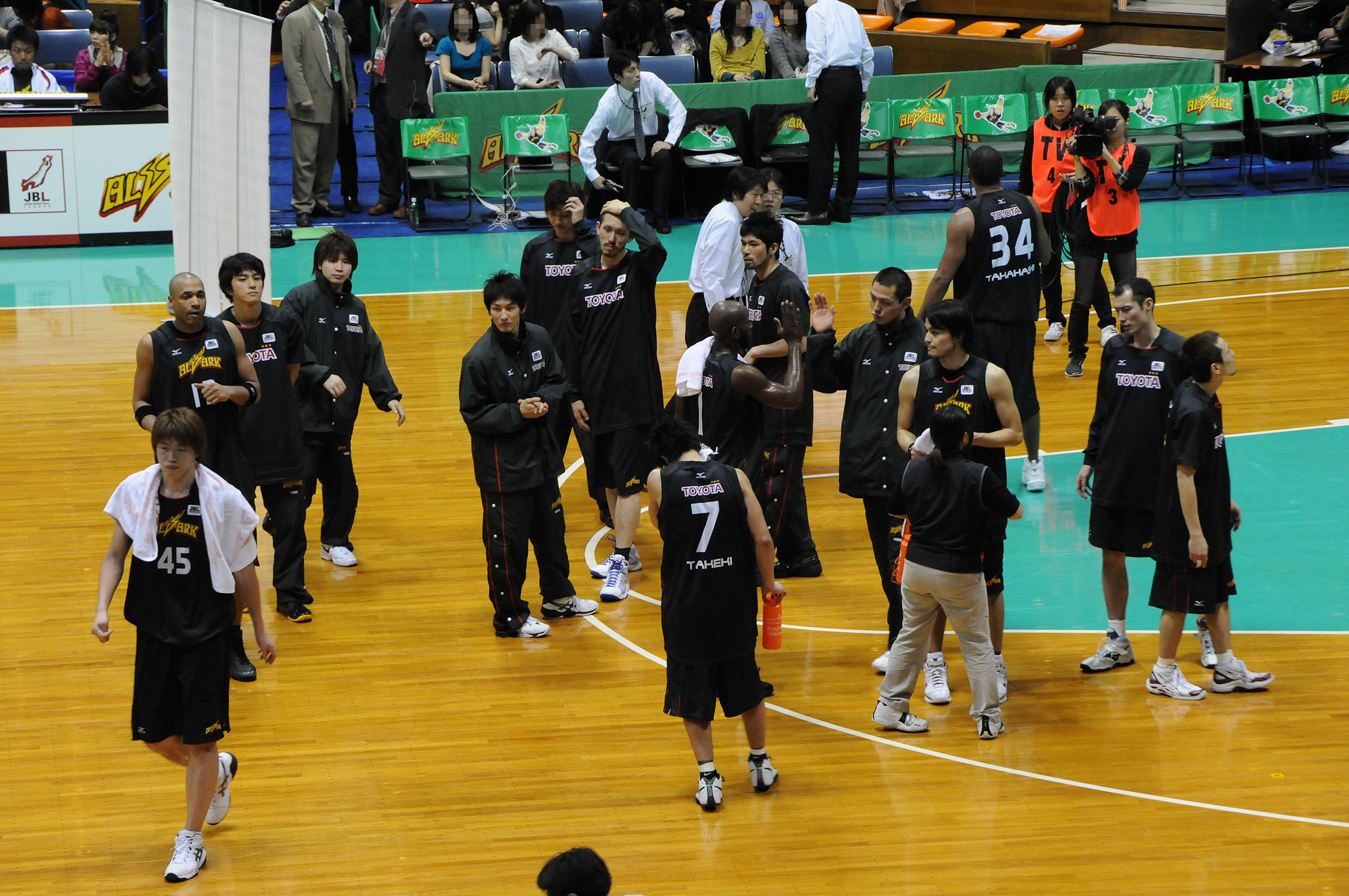
Toyota Alvark team in 2009

Alvark Tokyo is a Japanese professional basketball team based in Tokyo. The team, which is sponsored by Toyota, competes in the B.League Premier, the highest division of the B.League, as a member of the Eastern Conference. As of 2025, the team plays its home games at Toyota Arena Tokyo in Aomi, Kōtō Ward, which they share with the Tokyo Sun Rockers.

Founded as the Toyota Pacers in 1948, the club won two consecutive JBL Super League league titles in 2006 and 2007.

In July 2015, it was announced that the team would compete in the first division of the new Japan Professional Basketball League, which commenced from October 2016.

As of 2020, the team has been the reigning back-to-back champion of the B.League, Japan's top basketball league.

== Honors ==
=== Domestic ===
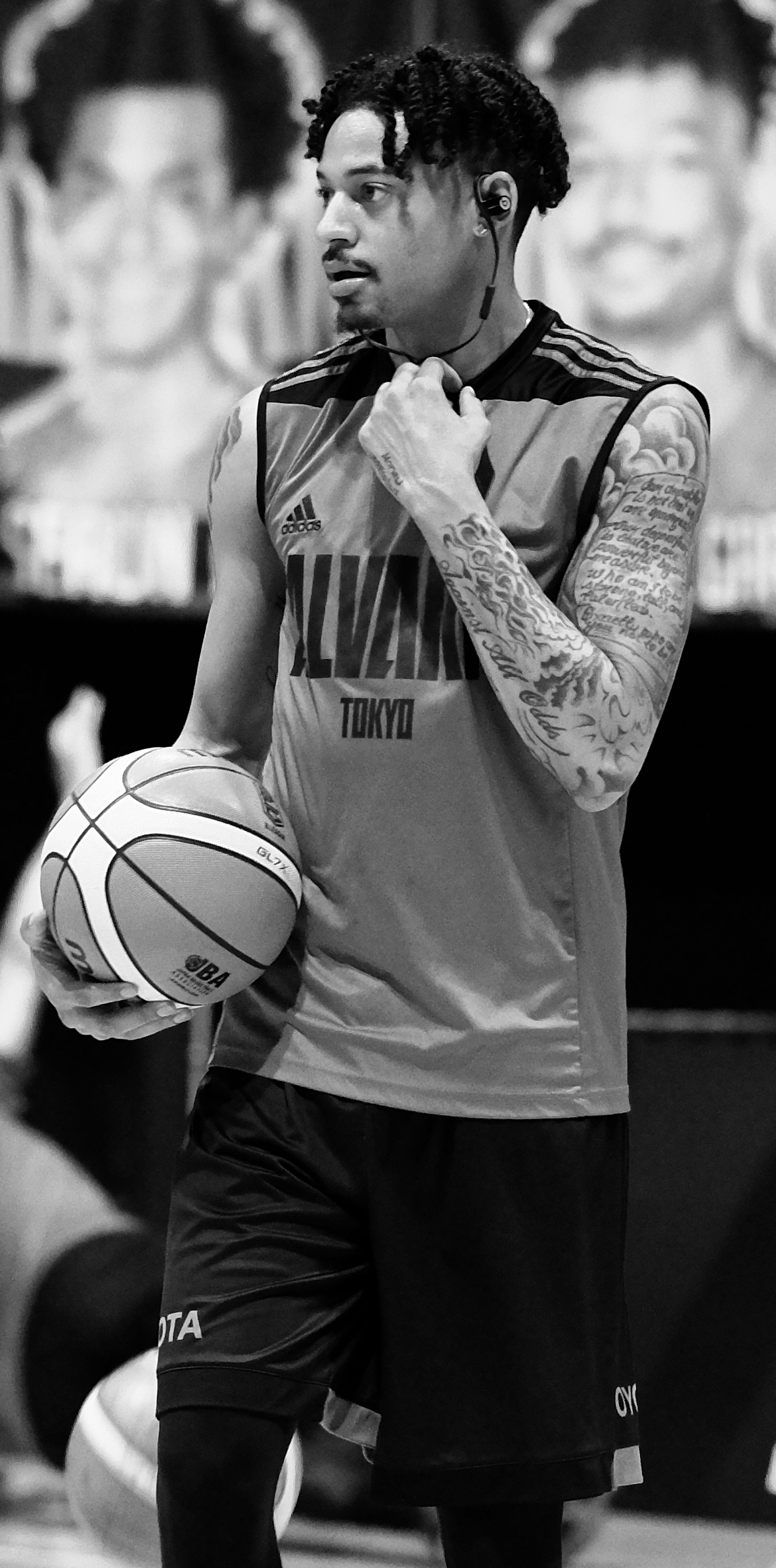
Diante Garrett

- B.League
  - Champions (2): 2018, 2019
- National Basketball League
  - Runner-up (1): 2015
- Japan Basketball League
  - Champions (1): 2011
- JBL Super League
  - Champions (3): 2001, 2005, 2006
  - Runner-up (1): 2002
  - 3rd place (1): 2004
- Japan League Division I
  - Runner-up (1): 1996
  - 3rd place (1): 1991

=== Continental ===
- FIBA Asia Champions Cup
  - Champions (1): 2019
  - Runner-up (1): 2018

== Players ==
=== Current roster ===
Note: Flags indicate national team eligibility at FIBA-sanctioned events. Players may hold other non-FIBA nationalities not displayed.

Alvark Tokyo roster
Players
Coaches

Pos.	No.	Nat.	Name	Ht.	Age
F	1	(United States)	D. J. Hogg	2.07 m (6 ft 9 in)	30 – 3 September 1996
G	2	(Japan)	Sota Okura	1.85 m (6 ft 1 in)	27 – 28 May 1999
PG	3	(Japan)	Kai Toews	1.88 m (6 ft 2 in)	28 – 17 September 1998
G	5	(Japan)	Hiromu Nakamura	1.77 m (5 ft 10 in)	28 – 29 November 1997
G	9	(Japan)	Shuto Ando	1.90 m (6 ft 3 in)	32 – 13 June 1994
SF	10	(United States)	Zack Baranski	1.93 m (6 ft 4 in)	33 – 18 December 1992
SF	11	(United States)	Keyontae Johnson	1.93 m (6 ft 4 in)	26 – 24 May 2000
G/F	13	(Japan)	Shohei Kikuchi	1.91 m (6 ft 3 in)	42 – 27 August 1984
G	17	(Japan)	Ryo Iida	1.85 m (6 ft 1 in)	31 – 11 April 1995
PF	21	(Japan)	Gen Hiraiwa	2.00 m (6 ft 7 in)	28 – 5 December 1997
F/C	22	(Japan)	Ryan Rossiter	2.06 m (6 ft 9 in)	37 – 14 September 1989
F/C	44	(United States)	Frank Kaminsky	2.13 m (7 ft 0 in)	33 – 4 April 1993
F/C	47	(Australia)	Lachlan Olbrich	2.08 m (6 ft 10 in)	22 – 30 December 2003
G	75	(Japan)	Taiki Osakabe	1.87 m (6 ft 2 in)	28 – 15 July 1998
G/F	77	(United States)	DeJon Jarreau	1.96 m (6 ft 5 in)	28 – 23 January 1998

Head coach

- (United States) Ryan Richman

Assistant coach(es)

- (Japan) Kanji Ikehata
- (Japan) Kodai Taira
- (Japan) Yuki Yamaguchi

Legend

- (C) Team captain
- Injured

- Roster
Updated: October 1, 2026

=== Depth chart ===
Pos.	Starting 5	Bench 1	Bench 2
C	Lachlan Olbrich	Ryan Rossiter	Frank Kaminsky
PF	D. J. Hogg	Zack Baranski	Gen Hiraiwa
SF	Keyontae Johnson	DeJon Jarreau	Shohei Kikuchi
SG	Shuto Ando	Ryo Iida	Taiki Osakabe
PG	Kai Toews	Sota Okura	Hiromu Nakamura

== Notable players ==
Note: Flags indicate national team eligibility at FIBA-sanctioned events. Players may hold other non-FIBA nationalities not displayed.

Criteria

To appear in this section a player must have either:

- Set a club record or won an individual award while at the club
- Played at least one official international match for their national team at any time
- Played at least one official NBA match at any time.

- (Japan) Tomoo Amino
- (Japan) Seiya Ando
- (United States) Jeff Ayres
- (Japan) Yudai Baba
- (United States) Clif Brown
- (United States) Wilbert Brown
- (United States) Louis Campbell
- (Japan) Satoru Furuta
- (United States) Diante Garrett
- (United States) Jeff Gibbs
- (Japan) Keishi Handa
- (Japan) Tenketsu Harimoto
- (United States) Juaquin Hawkins
- (United States) Tom Hovasse
- (Japan) Kei Igarashi
- (Japan) Reina Itakura
- (United States) Brendan Lane
- (United States) Todd Lindeman
- (United States) Ricardo Marsh
- (Japan) Keijuro Matsui
- (Finland) Alex Murphy
- (United States) Drew Naymick
- (United States) Charles O'Bannon
- (Japan) Yusuke Okada
- (Japan) Ryumo Ono
- (Japan) Takehiko Orimo
- (United States) Doron Perkins
- (United States) Trent Plaisted
- (United States) Philip Ricci
- (Japan) Satoshi Sakumoto
- (Japan) Ryōta Sakurai
- (Japan) Kazuhiro Shoji
- (United States) Richard Solomon
- (Japan) Yuta Tabuse
- (Japan) Michael Takahashi
- (Japan) Joji Takeuchi
- (Japan) Kosuke Takeuchi
- (Japan) Daiki Tanaka
- (United States) Stephen Thompson
- (United States) Devin Uskoski
- (United States) Jawad Williams
- (United States) Howard Wright
- (Japan) Daiji Yamada
- (Japan) Hirotaka Yoshii
- (Montenegro) Milko Bjelica

== Head coaches ==
- (Japan) Shuji Ono: 2000–2005
- (United States) John Patrick: 2005–2006
- (Germany) Torsten Loibl: 2006–2008
- (Japan) Koju Munakata: 2008–2010
- (United States) Donald Beck: 2010–2015
- (Japan) Takuma Ito: 2015–2017
- (Montenegro) Luka Pavićević: 2017–2022
- (Lithuania) Dainius Adomaitis: 2022–present

== Practice facilities ==
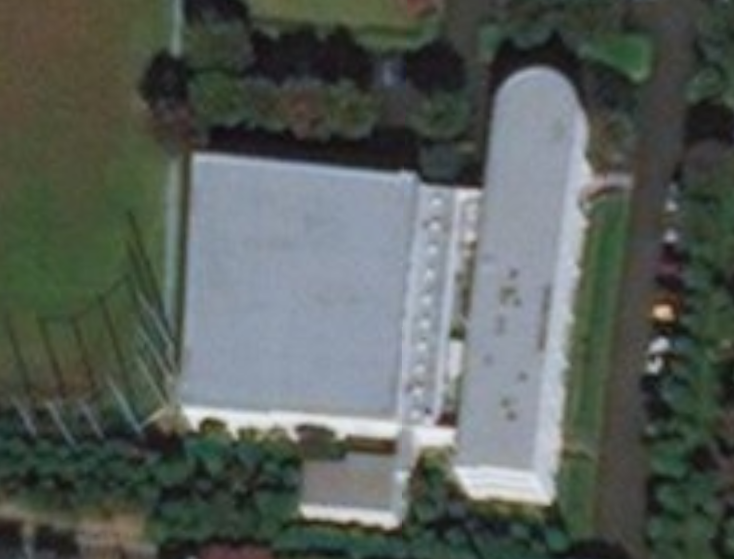
Toyota Motors Fuchu Sports Center

They have their own gymnasium, Toyota Motors Fuchu Sports Center in Kitayamacho, Fuchu, Tokyo.

== Seasons ==
=== B.League ===
Key
Finish	Final position in league or division standings
MVP	Most Valuable Player

League champions	Division champions	Playoff berth

Season	League	Division	Regular season					Playoffs	Awards
Season	League	Division	Finish (Note: The Finish column lists regular season results and excludes postseason play.)	W (Note: The Wins and Losses columns list regular season results and exclude any postseason play. Regular and postseason records are combined only below the table.)	L	Pct	GB	Playoffs	Awards
Alvark Tokyo
2016–17	B1	East	2nd	44	16	.733	5	Won quarterfinals (NeoPhoenix) 2–0; Lost semifinals (Brave Thunders) 1–2	—
2017–18	B1	East	2nd	44	16	.733	2	Won quarterfinals (Hannaryz) 2–0; Won semifinals (SeaHorses) 2–0; Won finals (Jets)	—
2018–19	B1	East	3rd	44	16	.733	8	Won quarterfinals (Albirex) 2–0; Won semifinals (Golden Kings) 2–1; Won finals (Jets)	—
2019–20	B1	East	1st	32	9	.780	—	—	Daiki Tanaka (MVP)
2020–21	B1	East	6th	32	24	.571	15	—	—
2021–22	B1	East	3rd	39	14	.736	0	Lost quarterfinals (Susanoo Magic) 1–2	—
2022–23	B1	East	2nd	42	18	.700	11	Won quarterfinals (Susanoo Magic) 2–1; Lost semifinals (Jets) 0–2	—
2023–24	B1	East	2nd	48	12	.800	3	Lost quarterfinals (Golden Kings) 1–2	—
2024–25	B1	Central	2nd	44	16	.733	3.5	Lost quarterfinals (Jets) 0–2	—
2025–26	B1	East	4th	41	19	.683	4	Lost quarterfinals (Velca) 0–2	—
2026-27	Premier	East				–			
