= Mari Konno =

Japanese basketball player

Mari Konno (紺野 麻里, Konno Mari; born 18 May 1980) is a Japanese former basketball player who competed in the 2004 Summer Olympics.

== Personal life ==
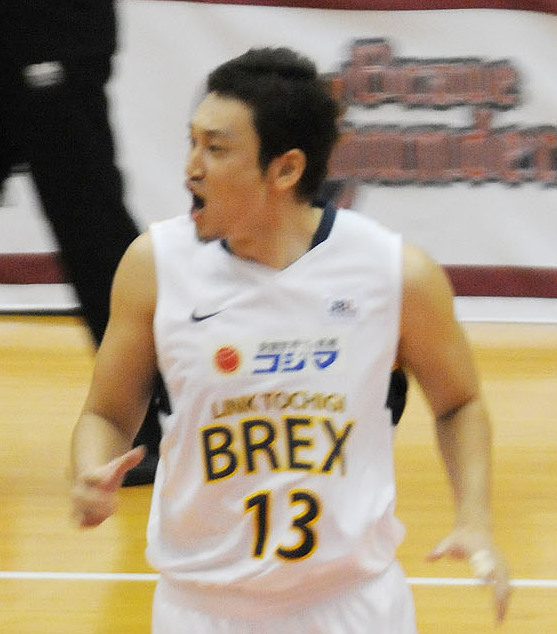
Ryuzo Anzai

She has been married to Ryuzo Anzai, a head coach of the Tochigi Brex.
