= Levanga Hokkaido =

Professional basketball team in Sapporo, Hokkaido Prefecture, Japan

- Leagues: B.League
- Founded: 2006; 20 years ago
- History: Rera Kamuy Hokkaido; Basketball Club Hokkaido; Levanga Hokkaido
- Arena: Hokkai Kitayell
- Capacity: 8,000
- Location: Sapporo, Hokkaido, Japan
- Team colors: Chartreuse and Sapphire
- Main sponsor: Eagle Pachinko
- President: Takehiko Orimo
- Website: www.levanga.com
Home	Away	Third

Levanga Hokkaido (レバンガ北海道) is a Japanese professional basketball team based in the city of Sapporo on the island of Hokkaido. The team competes in the B.League Premier, the highest division of the B.League, as a member of the Eastern Conference. The team plays its home games at Hokkai Kitayell.

The club was founded in 2006 as Rera Kamuy Hokkaido; this name comes from the language of the Ainu, an ethnic group indigenous to Hokkaido, and means "god of the winds". The franchise changed its name twice in 2011, first when the club's parent company was kicked out of the league due to financial woes in the season. The team ended the season with a league-backed management group and a new moniker, calling itself Basketball Club Hokkaido. It took its current name, Levanga Hokkaido, in August 2011.

The team debuted in the Japan Basketball League in the 2007–2008 season and is one of only three teams in the league not owned by a major Japanese manufacturing company.

Levanga also plays some home games at the Asahikawa City General Gymnasium, Otaru City Gymnasium, Hakodate Arena, Obihiro City General Gymnasium and Kushiro Shitsugen no Kaze Arena.

The club was 200 million yen in debt in March 2017, but has since paid it off.

== Honours ==
=== Continental ===
- ABA Club Championship
  - Runner-up: 2008

== Roster ==
Note: Flags indicate national team eligibility at FIBA-sanctioned events. Players may hold other non-FIBA nationalities not displayed.

Levanga Hokkaido roster
Players
Coaches

Pos.	No.	Nat.	Name	Ht.	Age
F/C	1	(Japan)	Danieldan Nnanna	2.00 m (6 ft 7 in)	29 – 2 June 1997
G/F	2	(Philippines)	Dwight Ramos	1.93 m (6 ft 4 in)	28 – 2 September 1998
G	4	(Japan)	Shuto Terazono	1.70 m (5 ft 7 in)	32 – 28 June 1994
G	7	(Japan)	Tsukasa Nakano	1.85 m (6 ft 1 in)	29 – 28 October 1996
G/F	11	(Japan)	Ryota Sakurai (C)	1.94 m (6 ft 4 in)	43 – 13 March 1983
G	15	(Japan)	Ren Shimatani	1.75 m (5 ft 9 in)	26 – 28 July 2000
G	17	(Japan)	Shun Watanuki	1.78 m (5 ft 10 in)	38 – 2 November 1987
F/C	21	(Cyprus)	Darral Willis	2.06 m (6 ft 9 in)	30 – 21 January 1996
F	24	(United States)	De'Mon Brooks	2.02 m (6 ft 8 in)	34 – 28 May 1992
G	37	(Japan)	Ko Takahashi	1.69 m (5 ft 7 in)	24 – 13 February 2002
C	40	(United States)	Thomas Welsh	2.13 m (7 ft 0 in)	30 – 3 February 1996
G	66	(Japan)	Yuta Matsushita	1.80 m (5 ft 11 in)	27 – 2 May 1999
G/F	81	(Japan)	Kohei Sekino	1.83 m (6 ft 0 in)	32 – 1 August 1994

Head coach

(Japan) Ryutaro Onodera

Assistant coach(es)

(Japan) Taku Saito
(Japan) Fuminori Aiura
(Japan) Tomohiro Takeda

Legend

- (C) Team captain
- Injured

- Roster
Updated: 24 January 2023

== Notable players ==
To appear in this section a player must have either:

- Set a club record or won an individual award as a professional player.
- Played at least one official international match for his senior national team or one NBA game at any time.

- (England) Chris Ayer
- (Canada) Jordan Bachynski
- (United States) Joevan Catron
- (United States) Brian Fitzpatrick
- (Japan) Makoto Kato (fr)
- (Germany) Tilo Klette
- (United States) Jai Lewis
- (Sweden) Christian Maråker
- (Japan) Keijuro Matsui
- (United States) Daniel Miller
- (Finland) Alex Murphy
- (United States) Tyler Newton
- (Japan) Takehiko Orimo
- (Canada) Chad Posthumus
- (Philippines) Dwight Ramos
- (United States) Justin Reynolds
- (Japan) Ryōta Sakurai
- (Japan) Kohei Sekino
- (United States) Jahmar Thorpe
- (United States) Jerome Tillman
- (Canada) Marc Trasolini
- (United States) Jameel Watkins
- (United States) Thomas Welsh
- (United States) Greg Whittington
- (Japan) Daiji Yamada

== Coaches ==
- Tomoya Higashino
- Joe Bryant (2010–11)
- Yoshinori Kaneta
- Torsten Loibl
- Scott Berry
- Juan Manuel Hurtado Pérez (2013–14)
- Kota Mizuno
- José Neto
- Tomohide Utsumi
- Yuta Miyanaga
- Kenichi Sako

== Practice facilities ==
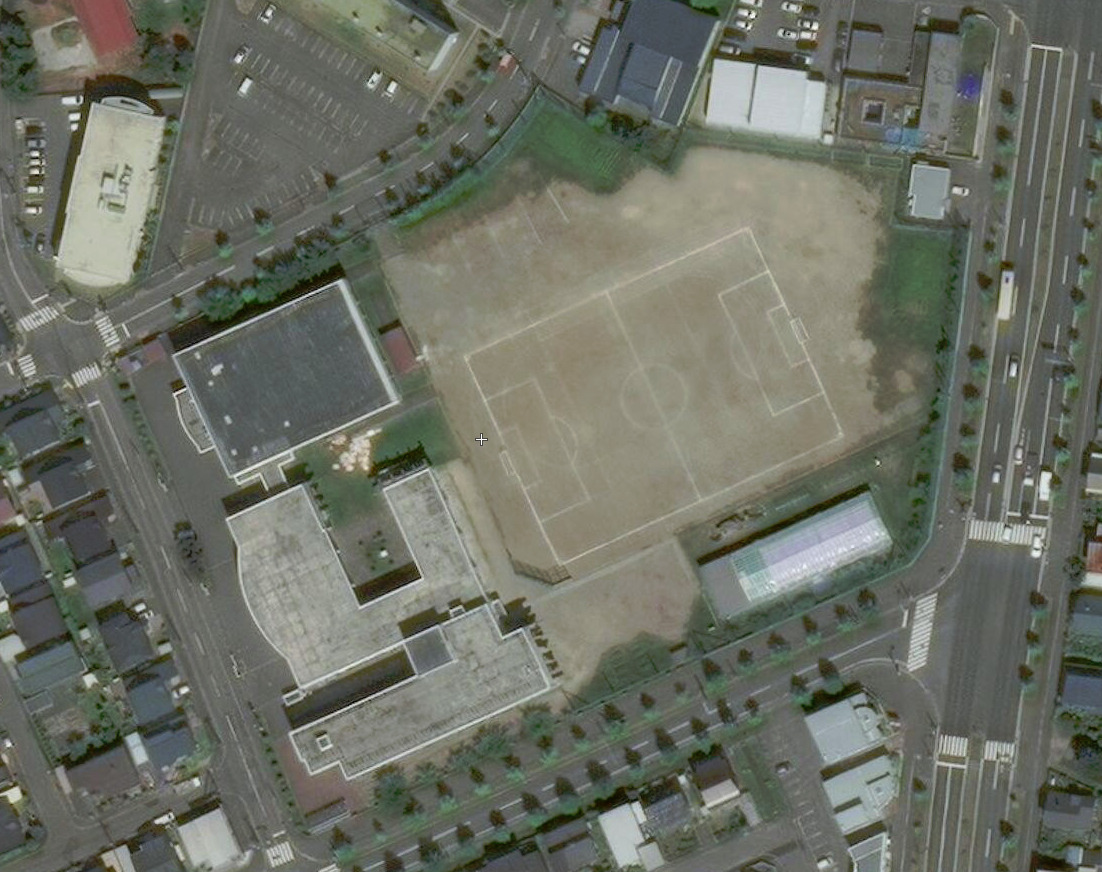
Kaminishi Village

- Sapporo Shinyo High School Gymnasium
- Kaminishi Village Court
