= Eurocup Basketball 2012–13 Last 16 Group J =

Standings and Results for Group J of the Last 16 phase of the 2012–13 Eurocup basketball tournament.

== Standings ==
Key to colors
Top two places in each group advance to the Quarterfinals

	Team	Pld	W	L	PF	PA	Diff	Tie-break
1.	(Spain) Uxúe Bilbao Basket	6	4	2	470	454	+16	2–0
2.	(Spain) Valencia BC	6	4	2	511	462	+49	0–2
3.	(Latvia) BC VEF Rīga	6	3	3	508	480	+28	
4.	(Czech Republic) ČEZ Nymburk	6	1	5	425	518	–93	

== Fixtures and results ==
All times given below are in Central European Time.

=== Game 1 ===
8 January 2013
20:30

Report

Valencia BC (Spain)	86–82	(Latvia) BC VEF Rīga
Scoring by quarter: 20–17, 19–28, 28–13, 19–24
Pts: Martínez 27; Rebs: Dubljević 9 Asts: Marković 11		Pts: Rowland 21; Rebs: Kavaliauskas 6 Asts: Rowland 9

Pabellón Municipal Fuente San Luis, Valencia
Attendance: 5,000
Referees: Tolga Sahin (ITA), Zdravko Rutesic (MNE), Regis Bardera (FRA)

9 January 2013
20:30

Report

Uxúe Bilbao Basket (Spain)	83–85	(Czech Republic) ČEZ Nymburk
Scoring by quarter: 17–19, 19–17, 17–27, 30–22
Pts: Mumbrú 13; Rebs: Hervelle 12; Asts: Hervelle, Vasileiadis 3		Pts: Rančík 30; Rebs: Rančík, Naymick 7 Asts: Welsch 6

Bilbao Arena, Bilbao
Attendance: 7,033
Referees: Sasa Pukl (SLO), Moritz Reiter (GER), Sergio Silva (POR)

=== Game 2 ===
15 January 2013
18:30

Report

BC VEF Rīga (Latvia)	99–76	(Spain) Uxúe Bilbao Basket
Scoring by quarter: 25–21, 25–23, 25–17, 24–15
Pts: Rowland 30; Rebs: Kavaliauskas 8 Asts: Bertāns 6		Pts: Vasileiadis 20; Rebs: Mumbrú, Hervelle 5 Asts: Zisis 4

Arena Riga, Riga
Attendance: 4,000
Referees: Robert Lottermoser (GER), Sergiy Chebyshev (UKR), Lahdo Sharro (SWE)

16 January 2013
18:00

Report

ČEZ Nymburk (Czech Republic)	77–82	(Spain) Valencia BC
Scoring by quarter: 17–25, 23–14, 11–28, 26–15
Pts: Rančík 24; Rebs: Naymick 6 Asts: Welsch 7		Pts: Dubljević 19; Rebs: Dubljević 6 Asts: Marković, Martínez 6

ČEZ Aréna, Pardubice
Attendance: 2,560
Referees: Borys Ryzhyk (UKR), Petar Obradovic (BIH), Ioannis Foufis (GRE)

=== Game 3 ===
23 January 2013
18:00

Report

ČEZ Nymburk (Czech Republic)	80–85	(Latvia) BC VEF Rīga
Scoring by quarter: 25–19, 17–15, 17–20, 21–31
Pts: Rančík 18; Rebs: Naymick 8 Asts: Pavković 5		Pts: Janičenoks 16; Rebs: Rowland, Bērziņš 6 Asts: Rowland 5

ČEZ Aréna, Pardubice
Attendance: 1,650
Referees: Juan Carlos Garcia Gonzalez (ESP), Igor Dragojevic (MNE), Apostolos Kalpakas (SWE)

23 January 2013
20:30

Report

Uxúe Bilbao Basket (Spain)	91–76	(Spain) Valencia BC
Scoring by quarter: 23–16, 18–28, 25–12, 25–20
Pts: Four players 14; Rebs: Raković, Mumbrú 8 Asts: López 7		Pts: Kelati 20; Rebs: Faverani 5 Asts: San Miguel 3

Bilbao Arena, Bilbao
Attendance: 8,104
Referees: Ilija Belosevic (SRB), Radomir Vojinovic (MNE), Gentian Cici (ALB)

=== Game 4 ===
29 January 2013
20:30

Report

Valencia BC (Spain)	60–61	(Spain) Uxúe Bilbao Basket
Scoring by quarter: 18–20, 19–9, 13–16, 10–16
Pts: Doellman, Lishouk, Martínez 14; Rebs: Doellman 7 Asts: Ribas 5		Pts: Vasileiadis 14; Rebs: Hervelle 11; Asts: Mumbrú 4

Pabellón Municipal Fuente San Luis, Valencia
Attendance: 8,500
Referees: Guerrino Cerebuch (ITA), Robert Vyklicky (CZE), Joseph Bissang (FRA)

30 January 2013
18:30

Report

BC VEF Rīga (Latvia)	81–59	(Czech Republic) ČEZ Nymburk
Scoring by quarter: 24–18, 20–13, 21–17, 16–11
Pts: Kavaliauskas 17; Rebs: Kavaliauskas 9 Asts: Rowland, Bērziņš 4		Pts: Houška 14; Rebs: Naymick 5 Asts: Hruban 6

Arena Riga, Riga
Attendance: 5,000
Referees: Jakub Zamojski (POL), Sergiy Zashchuk (UKR), Aare Halliko (EST)

=== Game 5 ===
12 February 2013
18:30

Report

BC VEF Rīga (Latvia)	96–103 (OT)	(Spain) Valencia BC
Scoring by quarter: 30–13, 19–25, 21–29, 20–23, Overtime: 6–13
Pts: Rowland 29; Rebs: Bērziņš 8 Asts: Rowland 5		Pts: Doellman 23; Rebs: Dubljević 10; Asts: Ribas 5

Arena Riga, Riga
Attendance: 7,000
Referees: Luigi Lamonica (ITA), Zdravko Rutesic (MNE), Tomasz Trawicki (POL)

12 February 2013
19:30

Report

ČEZ Nymburk (Czech Republic)	69–83	(Spain) Uxúe Bilbao Basket
Scoring by quarter: 15–24, 21–30, 20–11, 13–18
Pts: Rančík 19; Rebs: Rančík 7 Asts: Welsch 9		Pts: Raković 18; Rebs: Hervelle 8 Asts: Zisis, López 3

ČEZ Aréna, Pardubice
Attendance: 2,220
Referees: Srdan Dozai (CRO), Gianluca Mattioli (ITA), Marko Juras (SRB)

=== Game 6 ===
19 February 2013
20:00

Report

Valencia BC (Spain)	104–55	(Czech Republic) ČEZ Nymburk
Scoring by quarter: 29–22, 26–10, 24–10, 25–13
Pts: Ribas 20; Rebs: Faverani 7 Asts: Marković 7		Pts: Efevberha 12; Rebs: Nečas 5 Asts: Efevberha, Carter 2

Pabellón Municipal Fuente San Luis, Valencia
Attendance: 8,000
Referees: Paolo Taurino (ITA), Tomas Jasevicius (LTU), Petri Mantyla (FIN)

19 February 2013
20:00

Report

Uxúe Bilbao Basket (Spain)	76–65	(Latvia) BC VEF Rīga
Scoring by quarter: 13–22, 24–14, 14–17, 25–12
Pts: Mumbrú, López 15; Rebs: Moerman 9 Asts: López 5		Pts: Kavaliauskas 12; Rebs: Bērziņš, Kavaliauskas 8 Asts: Rowland 5

Bilbao Arena, Bilbao
Attendance: 9,101
Referees: Marek Cmikiewicz (POL), Petar Obradovic (BIH), Jurgis Laurinavicius (LTU)
