= Tyler Newton =

American basketball player

- Tyler Newton

Personal information
- Born: May 13, 1982 (age 44) Utica, New York, U.S.
- Listed height: 7 ft 1 in (2.16 m)
- Listed weight: 230 lb (104 kg)

Career information
- High school: John Burroughs (Burbank, California)
- College: Antelope Valley (2000–2001); Shasta (2001–2002); Pacific (2003–2005)
- NBA draft: 2005: undrafted
- Playing career: 2005–2011
- Position: Power forward / center

Career history
- 2005: Hervey Bay Hurricanes
- 2005–2006: San Jose Sky Rockets
- 2006–2007: Allianz Swans Gmunden
- 2007: Santa Barbara Breakers
- 2007–2008: Rera Kamuy Hokkaido
- 2008: Santa Barbara Breakers
- 2008–2009: Rera Kamuy Hokkaido
- 2009: Chico Rage
- 2009–2010: Toshiba Brave Thunders
- 2011: Link Tochigi Brex

Career highlights
- 2× JBL Super League All-Star (2007, 2008); 2× Big West Conference honorable mention (2004, 2005); First-team All-Golden Valley Conference (2002)

Tyler Isaac Newton (born May 13, 1982) is an American professional basketball player who plays for the Rera Kamuy Hokkaido of the Japan Basketball League (JBL Super League). Newton, commonly nicknamed "T-Newt," is 6 ft 10 in (2.08 m) tall and plays the power forward position, but is also capable of playing other frontcourt positions like center or small forward.

== High school ==
Newton attended John Burroughs High School in Burbank, California, where he lettered in volleyball and water polo while earning a scholastic achievement award. Newton began playing organized basketball during his sophomore year in high school, but failed to make the varsity squad and was never used in a game. By his senior year, Newton was scoring career bests of 33 points and 24 rebounds. The big stats were no fluke, as he grabbed 24 rebounds twice during the season and was the fourth leading rebounder in the entire Los Angeles area that year, leading his team to a 17–6 record en route to a league title, and Honorable Mention All-Foothill Conference honors. Newton was inducted into the John Burroughs Middle School Hall of Fame in 2006.

== College ==
After a season with the Antelope Valley (California) Marauders, Newton transferred to Shasta College in Redding, California, where he led the Knights to a 28–6 record while being named to the All-Conference team and honored as an All-State player.

Newton was recruited by the University of the Pacific in Stockton, California and redshirted during the 2002–2003 season. The next season, Newton averaged 7 points and 4 rebounds per game coming off the bench. Eight of his 10 double-digit scoring efforts came in games in which he did not start, including a 22-point performance in just 16 minutes of action. Newton was voted Most Inspirational by his teammates and earned All-Big West Conference Honorable Mention. The following season, Newton continued his quiet leadership in scoring and rebounding, while helping his team to their second NCAA Tournament appearance in as many years.

== Professional career ==
Newton is an experienced international athlete, having played for teams in countries such as Australia (Hervey Bay Hurricanes), Austria (Allianz Swans Gmunden), France (JDA Dijon Mustard) and Japan (Rera Kamuy Hokkaido). In the United States, he has played with the San Jose Skyrockets and Hollywood Fame of the ABA and the Santa Barbara Breakers of the IBL.

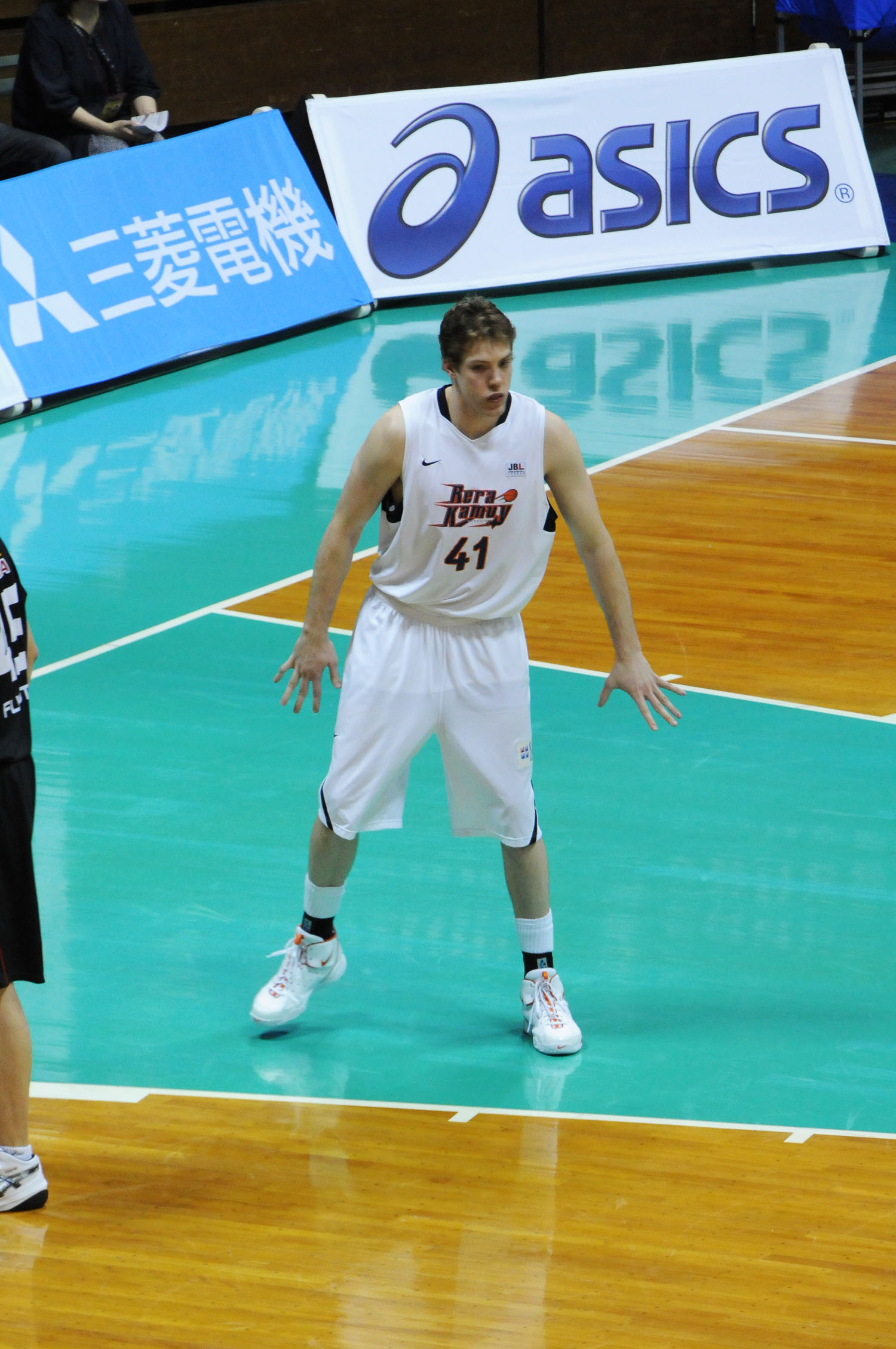
Newton with Rera Kamuy

In 2007, Newton was selected as one of two foreign (non-Japanese) players to lead a new Japanese franchise in the city of Sapporo. Newton joined Japanese superstar Takehiko Orimo for the inaugural season of the Rera Kamuy Hokkaido and, after a season of adjustment, they have turned the team into a leading force in the JBL. Newton and his team have the enthusiastic support of local residents, who are excited to have professional basketball in their city. Newton leads his team in scoring (17 points per game), rebounding (12 per game), blocked shots (1.4 per game).

He is also among the JBL League leaders in scoring, field goal percentage, blocked shots and rebounding. His accomplishments were acknowledged in 2007, as he was one of only four foreign (non-Japanese) players to be selected for the JBL League All-Star Game, which featured 24 of the top players in Japan. In 2008, Newton became a two-time All-Star and was the second-leading vote-getter among foreign players. Newton helped lead the East to a 120–98 victory by scoring 18 points and grabbing 9 rebounds in only 18 minutes of play. In the off-season of 2009 he played for the Chico Rage in the highly competitive Sacramento Professional Development League (SPDL) where he averaged 25.8 pts. 8.5 rebs. and 2 blocked shots a game going up against NBA players Donte Greene, Jason Thompson, and Matt Barnes.

In, Newton played for Link Tochigi Brex of the JBL.

== Player profile ==
Newton is a versatile, all-purpose front court player who mostly plays the power forward position, but has also played center, small forward, and point forward throughout his career. Newton is considered one of the best shooters in Japan, hitting over 60 percent of his field goal attempts. Newton briefly struggled with his free throw shooting early in the 2008–09 JBL season. However, by converting 80 percent (12/15) of his free throw attempts against a "Hack-a-Newt" defense by the Mitsubishi Diamond Dolphins, Newton has proven to be a solid free throw shooter as well.

On offense, Newton utilizes his quickness, size, and strength to get past defenders. Newton is known for his exceptional agility and upper body strength, which puts him among the leaders at finishing down low in the paint. He is a solid rebounder who regularly ranks among the league leaders in rebounds. His overall skill sets and on-court play have led to many comparisons to NBA legends Dirk Nowitzki, Kevin McHale, and Kevin Garnett.

== Personal life ==
Tyler Newton with Magic Johnson

During his high school years at John Burroughs High School, Newton was a letterwinner in basketball, water polo, and swimming.

.

== Career statistics ==
Legend
GP	Games played	GS	Games started	MPG	Minutes per game
FG%	Field goal percentage	3P%	3-point field goal percentage	FT%	Free throw percentage
RPG	Rebounds per game	APG	Assists per game	SPG	Steals per game
BPG	Blocks per game	PPG	Points per game	**Bold**	Career high

=== College ===
Year	Team	GP	GS	MPG	FG%	3P%	FT%	RPG	APG	SPG	BPG	PPG
2000–01	Antelope CC	32	32	??.?	.???	.???	.??	3.9	?.?	?.?	?.?	5.1
2001–02	Shasta CC	??	??	??.?	.???	.???	.??	6.8	?.?	?.?	1.7	13.6
2002–03	Pacific	Did not play—redshirt season										
2003–04	Pacific	33	6	19.7	.605	.250	.652	3.5	1.2	.5	.7	7.3
2004–05	Pacific	31	12	21.7	.596	.286	.616	4.5	1.7	.4	.4	7.3

=== Professional ===
Year	Team	GP	GS	MPG	FG%	3P%	FT%	RPG	APG	SPG	BPG	PPG
2005	Hervey Bay Hurricanes	??	??	??.?	.???	.???	.??	??.?	?.?	?.?	?.?	??.?
2007	Santa Barbara Breakers	??	??	??.?	.???	.???	.??	??.?	?.?	?.?	?.?	??.?
2007–08	Rera Kamuy Hokkaido (JBL)	??	??	??.?	.???	.???	.??	??.?	?.?	?.?	?.?	??.?
2008–09	Rera Kamuy Hokkaido (JBL)	35	30	24.3	.592	.167	.559	8.1	1.7	0.8	0.7	**14.8**

== Awards and honors ==
- Foothill League Champ: 2000
- LA Times All-Valley Team: 2000
- SoCalHoops Top 25 Senior Centers/Post Players: 2000
- First Team All-Golden Valley Conference: 2002
- California Community College All-State Team: 2002
- All Big West Honorable Mention: 2004
- All Big West Honorable Mention: 2005
- Most Inspirational Player: 2005
- John Burroughs HS Hall of Fame: 2006
- JBL (Japan) Super League All-Star Team: 2007
- ABA (Asia) Championship All-Tournament Team: 2008
- JBL (Japan) Super League All-Star Team: 2008
