= Utsunomiya Brex =

Professional basketball team in Utsunomiya, Tochigi Prefecture, Japan

- Leagues: B.League
- Founded: 2007
- History: Tochigi Brex (2007–2008); Link Tochigi Brex (2008–2019); Utsunomiya Brex (2019–present)
- Arena: Brex Arena Utsunomiya
- Capacity: 4,500
- Location: Utsunomiya, Tochigi Prefecture, Japan
- Team colors: Navy Blue and Yellow
- Main sponsor: Tochigi Bank
- Head coach: Zico Coronel
- Championships: 1 Basketball Champions League Asia (2025); 1 EASL (2026); 3 B.League (2007, 2022, 2025)
- Website: utsunomiyabrex.com
Home	Away

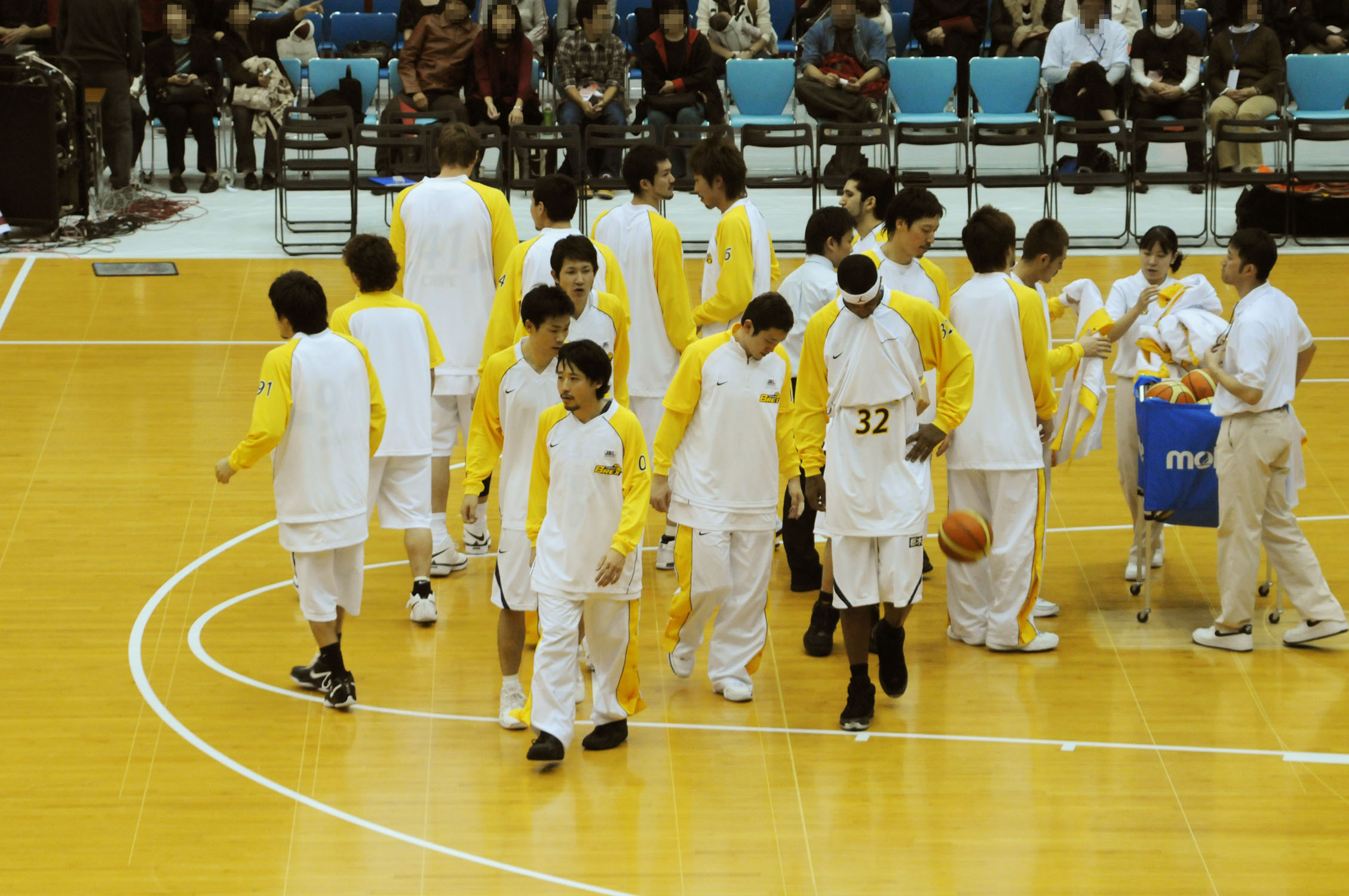
Link Tochigi Brex

Utsunomiya Brex is a Japanese professional basketball team based in Utsunomiya. The team competes in the B.League Premier, the highest division of the B.League, as a member of the Eastern Conference. The team plays its home games at Brex Arena Utsunomiya.

After winning the JBL 2 in 2008, the team played in the National Basketball League. The team was founded as Tochigi Brex in 2007 and was later named Link Tochigi Brex.

In July 2015, it was announced that the team would compete in the first division of the new Japan Professional Basketball League (B.League), which started in October 2016. Brex has won three B.League championships, in 2007, 2022 and 2025. They also won the continental title once, winning the Basketball Champions League Asia in 2025.

== Overview ==
The team began activities in December 2004, and participated in the lowest division of the Japanese Basketball League (JBL 2) from 2007-2008 after which the team was promoted to and participated in the league's highest division (JBL) from 2008-2013, participated in the National Basketball League (NBL) from 2013-2016, and is currently participating in the B.League since 2016.

The team has been operated by Tochigi Brex Co., Ltd. since the 2016-17 season, and was previously operated by Link Sports Entertainment Co., Ltd. The team is based in Utsunomiya City, Tochigi Prefecture, Japan, and its mother town is Kanuma City, Tochigi Prefecture.

The team name "Brex" is a coined word created from the pronunciation of the word "Breakthrough". In addition, the word "rex" means king in Latin. In essence, the name "Brex" is a combination of "B" for basketball and "rex" for king. It means that the teaming is aiming for the top of basketball.

The team follows the color scheme of the Indiana Pacers of the National Basketball Association (NBA). The Pacers are based in Tochigi Prefecture's sister state of Indiana, USA, and acts as a tribute to the Pacers and the style of play and entertainment of the NBA.

The team's philosophy is "a team that is strongly loved and motivated". They won a championship in their first year in the JBL 2, and was subsequently promoted to the JBL in the following year, and won the JBL championship in the year after.

=== Historical Uniforms ===
HOME
2016 - 18	2018 - 20	2020 - 22	2022 - 23

AWAY
2016 - 18	2018 - 20	2020 - 22	2022 - 23

OTHER
2017 - 18; 3rd	2018 - 20; 3rd	2020 - 21; 3rd

=== Home Arena ===
The Utsunomiya Brex's home arena is the Utsunomiya City Gymnasiam (Utsunomiya Brex Arena). Home games have also been held elsewhere in the Tochigi Prefecture beside Utsunomiya City. It has also been held in Gunma Prefecture and Fukushima Prefecture in the past.

=== Mascot ===
- Brecky (ブレッキー)

Brecky wears the jersey number 028, and specializes in three-point shooting. He participates in the team's events and home games.

- Berry-chan (ベリーちゃん)

Berry-chan also participates in home games with Brecky as well as events in Tochigi Prefecture where she is a member of the cheerleading team, BREXY.

=== Cheerleading Team ===
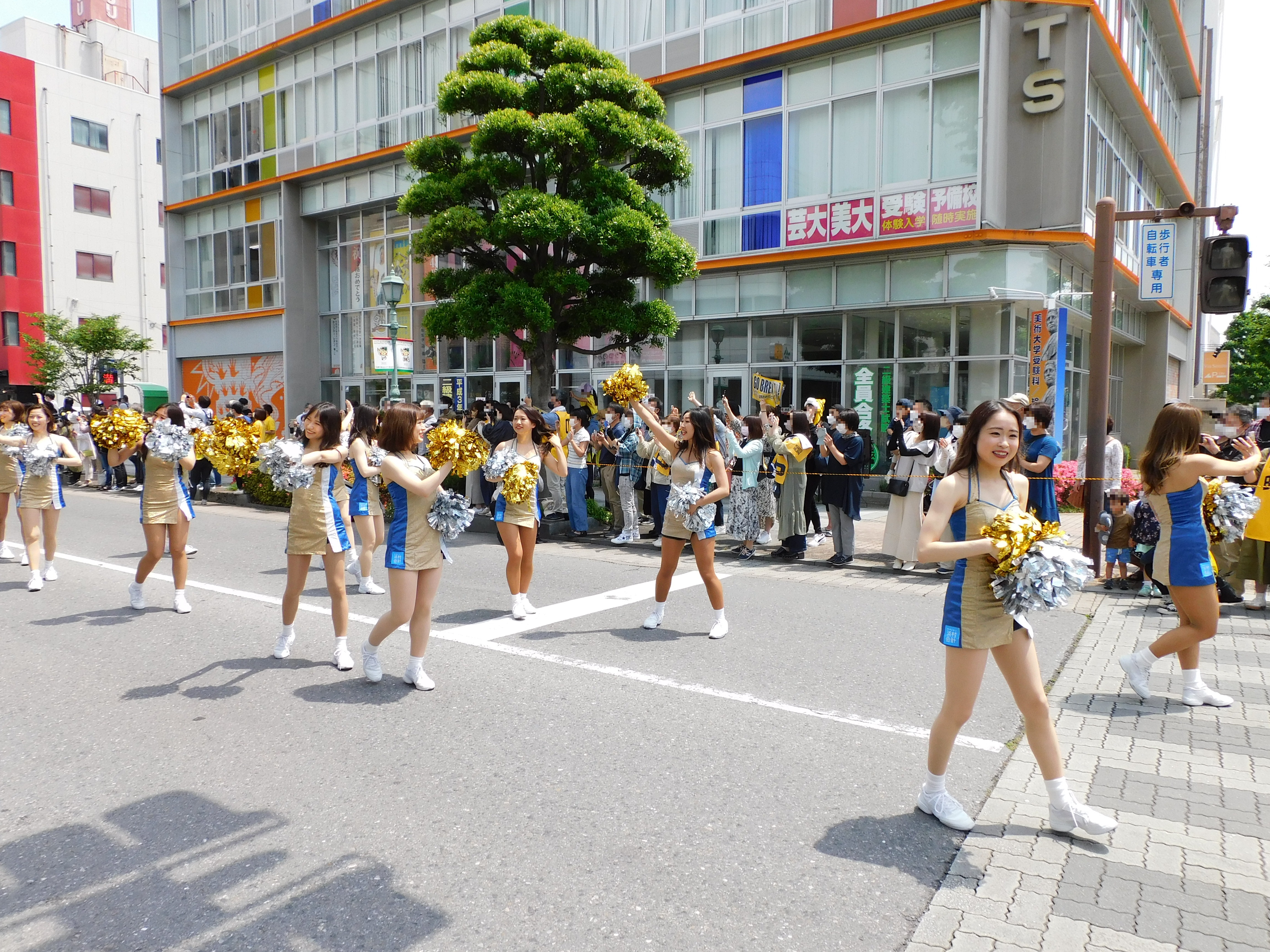
BREXY at Victory Parade, 2022.

- BREXY

Along with the official cheerleading team, BREXY, there is "B-girls", which consists of 14 elementary and junior high school students who have passed the official cheerleading team's school auditions.

=== 3x3 Team ===
- UTSUNOMIYA BREX.EXE

The BREX.EXE began in the 2015-2016 season and took their name in the 2019-2020 season.

== History ==
=== Founding History ===
In December 2004, the group began activities with the goal of establishing a professional basketball team in Tochigi Prefecture. Then in December 2005, they collected 15,000 signatures to support the establishment of the team. In June 2006, the group formally applied to join the now JBL, but was rejected a month later, and applied in September of the same year to the newly established lower league, currently the JBL2.

In April 2007, the team was able to participate in the JBL2 after the Otsuka Shokai Alphas (now Koshigaya Alphas) withdrew. In June 2007, the team name was decided to be "Tochigi Brex," and the team launched with Utsunomiya City set as their hometown, as well as 10 professional players on contract.

=== JBL2 ===
The former coach of the Otsuka Shokai Alphas, Yoshinori Kaneda, became the Brex's first head coach, and in the 2007-2008 season, they advanced to the finals and defeated the Chiba Jets Funabashi to become JBL2 champions.

=== JBL ===
==== 2008-2009 Season ====
When, in August 2007, the OSG Phoenix (now San-en NeoPhoenix) withdrew from the JBL, the league began recruiting new teams and the Brex formally applied once again for entry into the JBL. They were then promoted to the higher tiered league, and naming rights to the team were then sold to their main sponsor, Link & Motivation, who decided to call the team, "Link Tochigi Brex." The head coach then changed to Mitsuhiko Katou, who also brought along Yuta Tabuse and Jun Takaku as players. Other new players also included Kawamura Takuya, Itou Shunsuke, and Oomiya Hiromasa.

After the start of the 2008-2009 season, Kato was dismissed, and Thomas Wisman was brought in as the head coach. Wisman coached the Isuzu Motors (now Yokohama Giga Spirits) and the Jomo Sunflowers (now JX-Eneos Sunflowers).

==== 2009-2010 Season ====
The team signed a two-year contract with Wisman as their head coach, and the team acquired Narito Namizato, the winner of the "Slam Dunk Scholarship".

On March 20, 2010, the team was victorious against the Mitsubishi Electric Diamond Dolphins (now Nagoya Diamond Dolphins) and was a lock for the fourth seed in the regular season and advanced to the playoffs for the first time since they were promoted to the JBL. After defeating the Panasonic Trians two games to one, they were able to advance to the finals where they met the Aisin Seahorses (now SeaHorses Mikawa). They were able to defeat the Seahorses in three games and became JBL champions.

==== 2010-2011 Season ====
With a year left on his contract, Wisman retired from the team to join the Japanese National Basketball Team. Bruce Palmer, who was previously an advisory coach for the Toyota Alvark (now Alvark Tokyo) was appointed as the teams tentative head coach before he resigned due to problems concerning the cancellation of his contract with his former team. Jason Rabedeaux, the head coach of the Jiangsu Nanjing Steel Dragons (now Jiangsu Dragons), was signed to a two-year contract with the Brex.

Rabedeaux was dismissed on December 15 due to unsatisfactory results, and Palmer was reappointed as the team's head coach. After that, the season was cancelled due to the 2011 Tōhoku earthquake and tsunami.

==== 2011-2012 Season ====
Kazuto Aono, the former head coach of the Kyoto Hannaryz, was brought on as an assistant coach under Palmer. Daiji Yamada from Levanga Hokkaido and Tomoo Amino from the Aisin Seahorses were brought in as new players. In addition, former NBA player Olumide Oyedeji and former Hitachi SunRockers player Tyler Smith joined the roster. In December, the Kojima presents KIZUNA Dream Match 2011 charity game to help support the 2011 Tōhoku earthquake and tsunami reconstruction efforts was held at Utsunomiya Brex Arena.

The team missed the playoffs this season, and dismissed Palmer on March 12, 2012. Aono acted as the head coach with four games remaining. The team's general manager resigned at the end of the season to become the deputy general manager and COO of the Japan Basketball Association.

==== 2012-2013 Season ====
Shingo Kamata was appointed as the team's new general manager, and appointed Antanas Sireika as the new head coach. Sireika served as the head coach of the Lithuanian national team at the Athens Olympics.

=== Modern era ===
In the 2024–25 regular season, Brex posted a stellar 48–12 record, securing the top seed. The performance came after coach Kevin Braswell died in February, stating the squad “completed the entire team in 60 games” and rallied through adversity. Brex went on to win their third B.League championship. Brex guard D.J. Newbill was instrumental for the team, winning the league's MVP and FInals MVP awards. As champions, they qualified for the Basketball Champions League Asia, where they made their debut.

On June 13, 2025, Brex won their first-ever BCL Asia championship, after defeating the record champions Al Riyadi in the final in Dubai. D.J. Newbill was decisive once again and was named the competition MVP. It was the first Asian title for Brex, which directly qualified them to the 2025 FIBA Intercontinental Cup.

== Roster ==
Utsunomiya Brex roster
Players
Coaches

Pos.	No.	Nat.	Name	Ht.	Age
G	0	(Japan)	Yuta Tabuse (C)	1.73 m (5 ft 8 in)	46 – 5 October 1980
G/F	3	(Japan)	Tanaka Daiki	1.93 m (6 ft 4 in)	19 – 26 April 2007
G	6	(Japan)	Makoto Hiejima	1.91 m (6 ft 3 in)	36 – 11 August 1990
G	7	(Japan)	Atsuya Ogawa	1.90 m (6 ft 3 in)	24 – 24 June 2002
G	9	(Japan)	Yusuke Endo	1.86 m (6 ft 1 in)	36 – 19 October 1989
F/C	10	(Japan)	Kosuke Takeuchi	2.06 m (6 ft 9 in)	41 – 29 January 1985
G	12	(Japan)	Shinji Takashima	1.91 m (6 ft 3 in)	25 – 13 October 2000
G	13	(Japan)	Hironori Watanabe	1.80 m (5 ft 11 in)	38 – 22 March 1988
F	14	(Japan)	Wataru Murakishi	1.96 m (6 ft 5 in)	29 – 28 July 1997
G	15	(Japan)	Yudai Ishikawa	1.76 m (5 ft 9 in)	21 – 24 November 2004
F	17	(Japan)	Hoshikawa Kaisei	1.94 m (6 ft 4 in)	21 – 19 November 2004
G	18	(Japan)	Seiji Ikaruga	1.85 m (6 ft 1 in)	32 – 8 January 1994
F	23	(United States)	Otis Frazier III	1.98 m (6 ft 6 in)	25 – 16 January 2001
G	25	(United States)	D.J. Newbill	1.93 m (6 ft 4 in)	34 – 28 May 1992
F	33	(Japan)	Gavin Edwards	2.06 m (6 ft 9 in)	38 – 15 January 1988
F	34	(United States)	Grant Jerrett	2.08 m (6 ft 10 in)	33 – 8 July 1993
F	42	(New Zealand)	Isaac Fotu	2.03 m (6 ft 8 in)	32 – 18 December 1993

Head coach

- (New Zealand) Zico Coronel

Assistant coach(es)

- (Japan) Masto Tanaka
- (Japan) Umezu Hinano
- (New Zealand) Jackson Stubbins

Legend

- (C) Team captain
- Injured

- Roster
Updated: 1 July 2026

== Notable players ==
Former logo

- (Cameroon) Alfred Aboya
- (Japan) Tomoo Amino
- (Japan) Seiya Ando
- (United States) Kyle Barone
- (United States) Ousmane Barro
- (United States) Cedric Bozeman
- (United States) Tommy Brenton
- (United States) Chase Fieler
- (Japan) Takatoshi Furukawa
- (United States) Randy Holcomb
- (Japan) Shunsuke Itō
- (Japan) Takuya Kawamura
- (United States) Chris King
- (United States) Ivan McFarlin
- (United States) Scott Merritt
- (United States) Drew Naymick
- (United States) Tyler Newton
- (Nigeria) Olumide Oyedeji
- (United States) Lamar Rice
- (Japan) Ryan Rossiter
- (United States) Tyler Smith
- (Japan) Yuta Tabuse
- (Japan) Ken Takeda
- (United States) Jahmar Thorpe
- (United States) Darian Townes
- (Georgia (country)) Nikoloz Tskitishvili
- (Indonesia) Brandon Jawato

== Coaches ==
- Yoshinori Kaneta
- Mitsuhiko Kato
- Jason Rabedeaux
- Bruce Palmer
- Antanas Sireika
- Thomas Wisman
- Kenji Hasegawa
- Ryuzo Anzai
- Norio Sassa
- Darius Dimavičius (asst)
- Michael Katsuhisa (asst)

== Arenas ==
- Brex Arena Utsunomiya
- TKC Strawberry Arena
- Tochigi Prefectural North Gymnasium
- Tochigi Prefectural South Gymnasium

== Practice facilities ==
- TKC Strawberry Arena

== Seasons ==
=== B.League ===
Key
Finish	Final position in league or division standings
MVP	Most Valuable Player

League champions	Division champions	Playoff berth

Season	League	Division	Regular season					Playoffs	Awards
Season	League	Division	Finish (Note: The Finish column lists regular season results and excludes postseason play.)	W (Note: The Wins and Losses columns list regular season results and exclude any postseason play. Regular and postseason records are combined only below the table.)	L	Pct	GB	Playoffs	Awards
Link Tochigi Brex
2016–17	B1	East	1st	46	14	.767	—	Won quarterfinals (Jets) 2–0; Won semifinals (Seahorses) 2–1; Won finals (Brave Thunders)	—
2017–18	B1	East	4th	34	26	.567	12	Lost quarterfinals (Seahorses) 0–2	—
2018–19	B1	East	2nd	49	11	.817	3	Won quarterfinals (Brave Thunders) 2–0; Lost semifinals (Jets) 0–2	—
Utsunomiya Brex
2019–20	B1	East	2th	31	9	.775	0.5	—	—
2020–21	B1	East	1st	49	11	.817	—	Won quarterfinals (Sunrockers) 2–0; Won semifinals (Brave Thunders) 2–1; Lost finals (Jets) 1–2	—
2021–22	B1	East	4th	40	16	.714	0.5	Won quarterfinals (Jets) 2–0; Won semifinals (Brave Thunders) 2–0; Won finals (Golden Kings) 2–0	—
2022–23	B1	East	3th	32	28	.533	21	—	—
2023–24	B1	East	1st	51	9	.850	—	Lost quarterfinals (Jets) 1–2	D.J. Newbill (MVP)
2024–25	B1	East	1st	48	12	.800	—	Won quarterfinals (Seahorses) 2–0; Won semifinals (Jets) 2–1; Won finals (Golden Kings) 2–1	D.J. Newbill (MVP)
2025–26	B1	East	1st	45	15	.750	—	Lost quarterfinals (Diamond Dolphins) 1–2	D.J. Newbill (MVP)
2026–27	Premier	East				–			
