= Kota Mizuno =

Japanese basketball coach

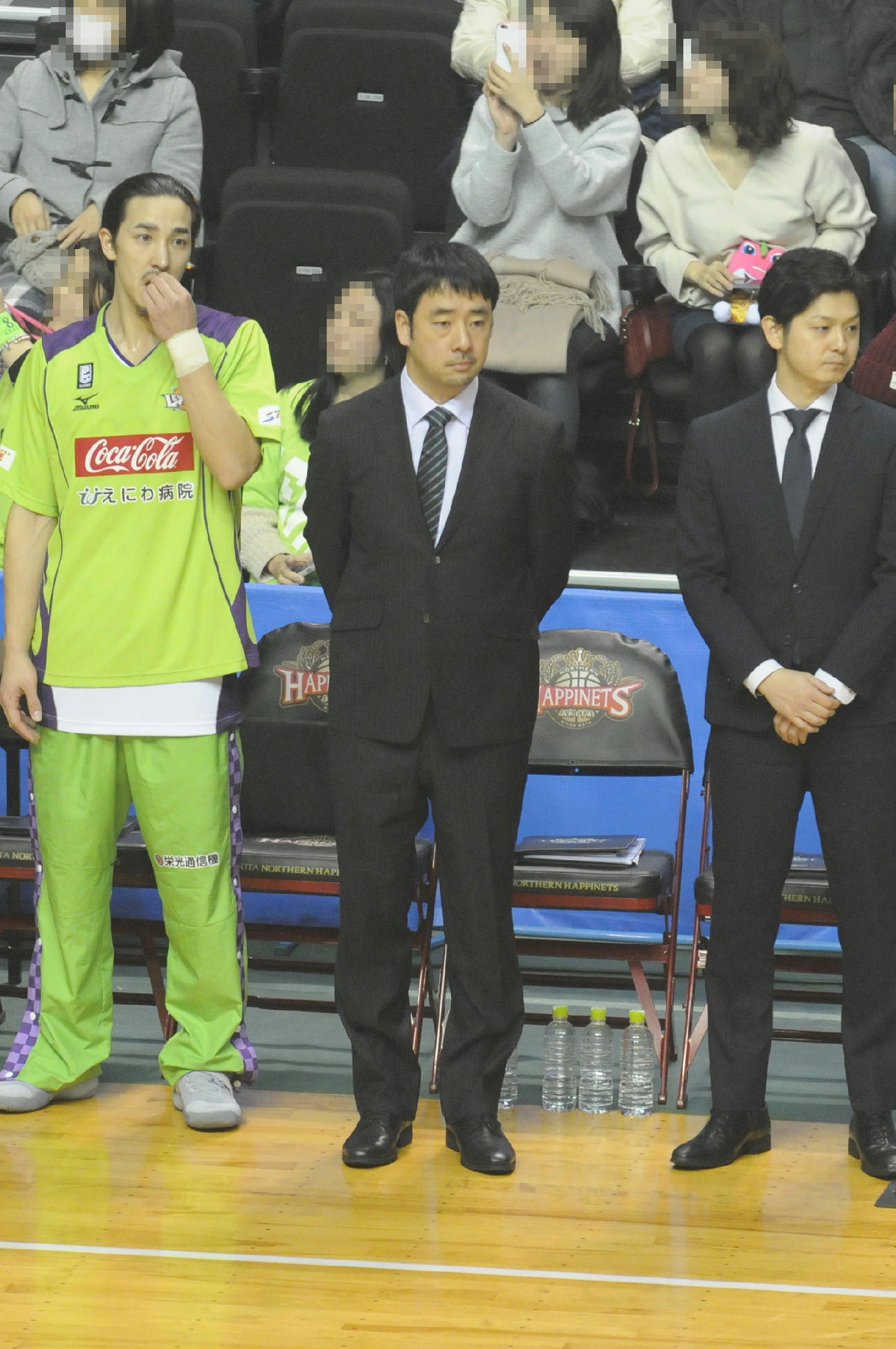

Gunma Crane Thunders
- Position: Head coach
- League: B.League

Personal information
- Born: August 2, 1982 (age 44) Tokyo, Japan

Career information
- High school: Komaba (Meguro, Tokyo)
- College: West Virginia University

Career history

Coaching
- 2008–2013: Link Tochigi Brex (assistant)
- 2009–2011: Japan (assistant)
- 2013–2014: Levanga Hokkaido (assistant)
- 2014–2018: Levanga Hokkaido
- 2018–2022: Alvark Tokyo (assistant)
- 2022–present: Gunma Crane Thunders

Career highlights
- As assistant coach: FIBA Asia Champions Cup champion (2019)

Kota Mizuno (水野 宏太, Mizuno Kōta) is the head coach of the Gunma Crane Thunders in the Japanese B.League.

== Head coaching record ==
Legend
Regular season	G	Games coached	W	Games won	L	Games lost	W–L %	Win–loss %
Playoffs	PG	Playoff games	PW	Playoff wins	PL	Playoff losses	PW–L %	Playoff win–loss %

Team	Year	G	W	L	W–L%	Finish	PG	PW	PL	PW–L%	Result
Levanga Hokkaido	2014-15	38	18	20	.474	6th in Eastern	-	-	-	–	-
Levanga Hokkaido	2015-16	55	28	27	.509	6th in Eastern	2	0	2	.000	6th place
Levanga Hokkaido	2016-17	60	23	37	.383	4th in Eastern	-	-	-	–	-
Levanga Hokkaido	2017-18	60	26	34	.433	6th in Eastern	-	-	-	–	-
