= Yoshinori Kaneta =

Japanese basketball player and coach

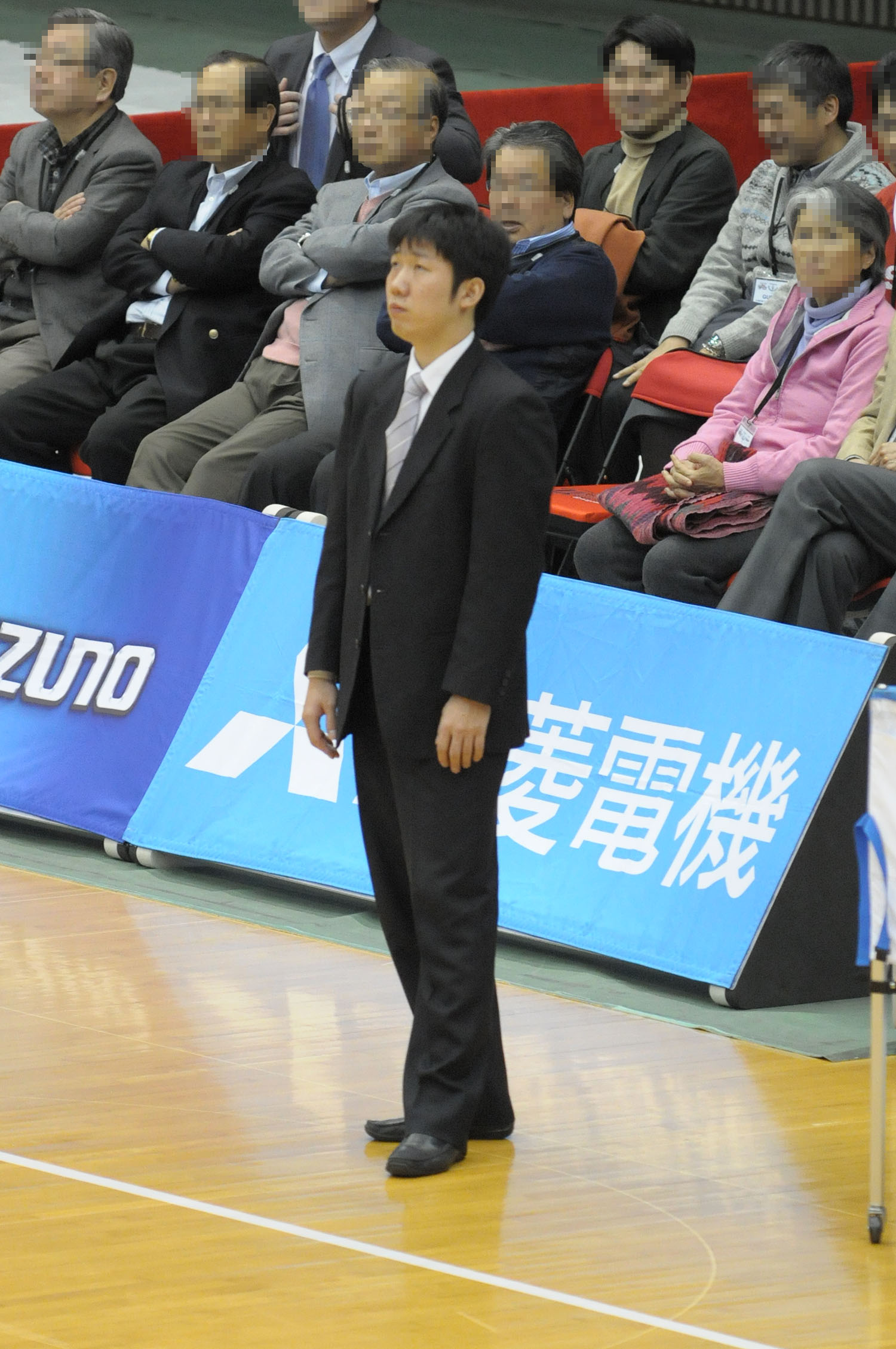

Chiba Jets Funabashi
- Position: Assistant coach
- League: B.League

Personal information
- Born: July 10, 1978 (age 48) Miyagi Prefecture
- Listed height: 175 cm (5 ft 9 in)
- Listed weight: 68 kg (150 lb)

Career information
- High school: Sendai (Sendai, Miyagi)
- College: Waseda University
- Playing career: 2001–2005

Career history

Playing
- 2001-2005: Excellence

Coaching
- 2005-2006: Otsuka Corporation Alphas (asst)
- 2006-2007: Otsuka Corporation Alphas
- 2007-2008: Link Tochigi Brex
- 2008-2011: Rera Kamuy Hokkaido (asst)
- 2011: Rera Kamuy Hokkaido
- 2011-2013: Panasonic Trians (asst)
- 2013-2016: Hitachi SunRockers (asst)
- 2016-present: Chiba Jets (asst)

Career highlights

Yoshinori Kaneta (金田詳徳, Kaneta Yoshinori) is the assistant coach of the Chiba Jets Funabashi in the Japanese B.League.

== Head coaching record ==
Legend
Regular season	G	Games coached	W	Games won	L	Games lost	W–L %	Win–loss %
Playoffs	PG	Playoff games	PW	Playoff wins	PL	Playoff losses	PW–L %	Playoff win–loss %

Team	Year	G	W	L	W–L%	Finish	PG	PW	PL	PW–L%	Result
Otsuka Corporation Alphas	2006-07	-	-	-	–	4th	-	-	-	–	-
Link Tochigi Brex	2007-08	16	13	3	.813	3rd	2	2	0	1.000	JBL2 Champions
Rera Kamuy Hokkaido	2011	14	4	10	.286	8th	-	-	-	–	-
