= Juan Manuel Hurtado Pérez =

Spanish journalist and basketball coach

Piti Hurtado
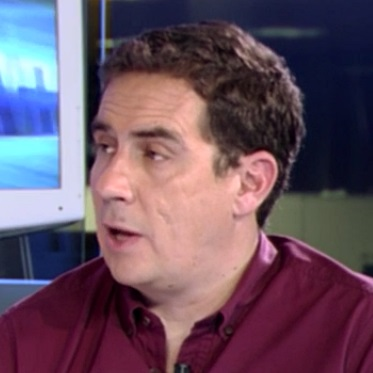

Personal information
- Nickname: "Piti"
- Born: Juan Manuel Hurtado Pérez; 24 May 1974 (age 52) Cáceres, Spain
- Occupation(s): Journalist and basketball coach
- Employers: DAZN; Movistar+

Sport
- Sport: Baloncesto
- Position: Coach
- Club: AB Mérida (2003–2005); Cáceres C.B. (2007–2010); Levanga Hokkaido (2013–2014); Guaiqueries de Margarita (2005)

Juan Manuel Hurtado Pérez, better known as Piti Hurtado, is a Spanish professional basketball coach, analyst and television commentator.

== Biography ==
Born in the city of Cáceres on 24 May 1974, his professional career in the world of basketball began when he joined the now defunct Cáceres C.B. in the ACB league, where he became assistant coach from 2000 to 2002. During the 2002–2003 season, he also collaborated with Utah University.

His first club as head coach was AB Mérida in the EBA league, which he coached between the 2003 and 2005 seasons. Subsequently, in the 2005–06 season he signed for CAI Zaragoza in the LEB league as assistant coach, where he worked under the orders of Alfred Julbe.

In 2006, he opened an account on the streaming platform YouTube and began editing and uploading videos related to basketball, tactics and technique.

In 2007 he returns to Cáceres to be part of a new project aimed at recovering the elite basketball in the capital of Cáceres, initially as general manager he is part of Cáceres 2016 that starts the 2007–08 season in the LEB de Plata. The bad results lead to the dismissal of the coach, Fede Pozuelo, so Hurtado takes the position of head coach and manages to qualify Cáceres 2016 to play in the play-offs for promotion to the LEB Gold league, although the objective of promotion is not achieved. However, after the disappearance of CB Alcudia, Cáceres 2016 acquires its rights to participate in the LEB Gold league, so during the 2008–09 season, Hurtado remains as coach of the Extremadura team in that category.

Hurtado returns to start the 2009/10 season as coach of the first team of Cáceres 2016 in LEB Oro, but the irregular start of the team (balance of 3 wins and 5 defeats) makes him resign after putting his position at the disposal of the club and not finding the expected support and also after deciding not to accept the position of general manager that was offered to him to continue being part of the Extremadura project.

In August 2013, he signed as coach of the Japanese team Levanga Hokkaido, becoming the first Spanish professional basketball coach to coach in the land of the rising sun. In his first season, he achieved the best historical record of the Sapporo team. Despite being out of the play-offs, only because of the basket-average, Levanga Hokkaido went from being an absolute loser to a play-off contender, achieving prestigious victories against almost all the big teams in the Japanese league (only Toshiba resisted them).

In December 2014, he was cut by Levanga Hokkaido, after a bad start to the league, with a record of 4 wins and 12 losses that left the team second to last in their conference.

In April 2015, Guaiqueries de Margarita, a member of Venezuela's Professional Basketball League (LPB), announced the hiring of Hurtado through the team's Twitter account. The Spaniard took the reins of the team with four games remaining in the regular season, with the team in 6th place in the standings (19 wins – 14 losses) and struggling to secure playoff qualification. He replaced Puerto Rican Tony Ruiz. Under Hurtado, the Guaiqueríes qualified for the Playoffs and advanced to the semi-finals of the Venezuelan Pro League, losing 4–1 to the Marinos de Anzoátegui.

In October 2015, he became a commentator on the Movistar+ de los partidos de la NBA en España. Hurtado joined journalist Fran Fermoso, with whom he shared the Tuesday and Wednesday night broadcasts until 2019. During this period he presented, together with Antoni Daimiel y Guille Giménez, the weekly competition review programme Generación NBA. In this programme, he developed the section "La Pitipedia", which was quoted by the American network TNT in the NBA Conference Finals in 2018.

In the summer of 2019, he announces that he will join DAZN, where he will broadcast and commentate the 2019–20 EuroLeague.

== Career as a coach ==
- 1989–1992 U12 Coach Colegio San Antonio de Padua (Cáceres).
- 1992–1998 Official ACB statistician Cáceres C.B.
- 1998–1999 Boys' U12 Coach Cáceres C.B.
- 1998–1999 Boys' U14 Coach Cáceres C.B.
- 1999–2000 Team Manager Cáceres C.B. (6th Classified Spanish Championship).
- 2000–2001 Associate Head Coach Cáceres C.B. ACB League. (2001 Copa del Rey Semi-finals, Korac Cup Round of 16).
- 2001–2002 Associate Head Coach Cáceres C.B. ACB League. Head Boys' U16 Coach (6th in the Spanish Championship)
- 2003–2004 AB Mérida. EBA League. Head Coach.
- 2004–2005 AB Mérida. EBA League. Head Coach.
- 2005–2006 CAI Zaragoza. LEB League. Associate Head Coach.
- 2007–2008 Cáceres 2016. LEB Silver League. First coach. (Final 4 Semi-finals)
- 2008–2009 Cáceres 2016. LEB Gold League. Head Coach.
- 2009–2010 Cáceres 2016. LEB Gold League. Head Coach.
- 2011–2012 Head Boys' U12 Coach of Extremadura State Team,
- 2012–2013 Head Boys' U14 Coach of Extremadura State Team,
- 2013–2015 Levanga Hokkaido. JBL. Head Coach.
- 2015 Guaiqueríes de Margarita LPB-Venezuela. Head Coach. (LPB Semi-finals)
- 2015–2016 Coach Youth Team Cáceres-San Antonio.
- 2016–2018 Coach Youth Teams CB Tres Cantos (Madrid).
- 2023–2025 Coach U16 and U17 CB Tres Cantos (Madrid).
- 2024 The Embassy Team U19 Head Coach (AVANCE at L'ATTITUDE BASKETBALL CLASSIC TOURNAMENT, 1st Tier High School USA)
- 2025 Head Coach Jordan National Team (FIBA Asia Cup 2025 Qualifiers, February)

== Statistics ==
Team	Temp.	M	W	L	%W-L	Ended	MP	WP	LP	%W-LP	Result
Quesos Monteoro Mérida	2003–04	30	16	14	.533	6th in Group D					
Quesos Monteoro Mérida	2004–05	30	17	13	.566	5th in Group D					
Cáceres 2016	2007–08	24	16	8	.666	Semi-finals	3	2	1	.666	Final 4 promotion
Cáceres 2016	2008–09	34	15	19	.441	11th					
Cáceres 2016	2009–10	8	3	5	.375	(resignation)					
Levanga Hokkaido	2013–14	54	31	23	.574	4th in East	–	–	–	–	–
Levanga Hokkaido	2014–15	16	4	12	.250	(termination)	–	–	–	–	–
Guaiqueríes Margarita	2015	9	6	3	.666	5th Regular League	5	1	4	.200	Semi-finals
Total		205	108	97	.526		8	3	5	.378	

== Media career ==
- 2011–2012 Editor of tactical videos for Euroleague.net.
- 2012–2013 Euroleague commentator for Marca TV.
- 2013–2025 Columnist and contributor to Gigantes del Basket magazine.
- 2015–2019 Color Commentator and analyst for Liga ACB, Euroleague and NBA on Movistar+.
- 2019–2023 Euroleague color commentator on DAZN, columnist in El Mundo,
- 2023–2025 Color commentator and host on Movistar+
