= Kazuto Aono =

Japanese basketball player

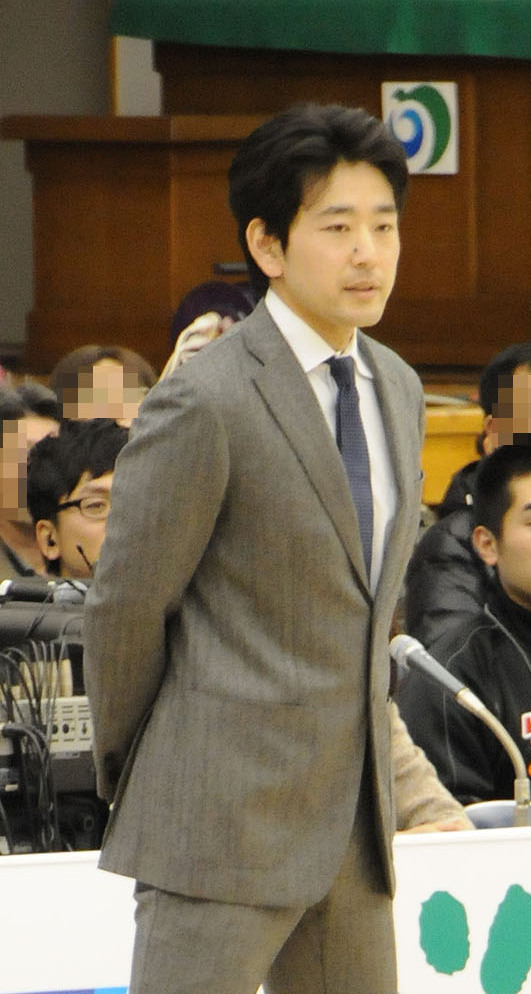

Otsuka Corporation Alphas
- Position: General manager
- League: B.League

Personal information
- Born: April 28, 1976 (age 50) Nagano, Nagano
- Listed height: 181 cm (5 ft 11 in)
- Listed weight: 75 kg (165 lb)

Career information
- High school: Tokai University Daisan (Chino, Nagano)
- College: Kyoto Sangyo University
- Playing career: 1999–2007

Career history

Playing
- 1999-2000: Dai Nippon Printing Eagles
- 2000-2001: GSPABL
- 2001-2005: Broncos Club
- 2005-2007: Saitama Broncos

Coaching
- 2007-2009: Saitama Broncos (asst)
- 2009-2010: Kyoto Hannaryz (asst)
- 2010-2011: Kyoto Hannaryz
- 2011-2012: Link Tochigi Brex (asst)
- 2012: Link Tochigi Brex
- 2013-2020: Otsuka Corporation Alphas/Koshigaya Alphas

Career highlights

Kazuto Aono (青野和人, Aono Kazuto) is the General manager of the Koshigaya Alphas in the Japanese B.League.

== Head coaching record ==
Legend
Regular season	G	Games coached	W	Games won	L	Games lost	W–L %	Win–loss %
Playoffs	PG	Playoff games	PW	Playoff wins	PL	Playoff losses	PW–L %	Playoff win–loss %

Team	Year	G	W	L	W–L%	Finish	PG	PW	PL	PW–L%	Result
Kyoto Hannaryz	2010	10	2	8	.200	6th in Western	-	-	-	–	-
Kyoto Hannaryz	2010-11	48	28	20	.583	5th in Western	3	1	2	.333	Lost in 1st round
Link Tochigi Brex	2012	4	1	3	.250	6th	-	-	-	–	-
Otsuka Corporation Alphas	2013-14	32	11	21	.344	7th	-	-	-	–	-
Otsuka Corporation Alphas	2014-15	32	16	16	.500	5th	-	-	-	–	-
Otsuka Corporation Alphas	2015-16	36	26	10	.722	2nd	-	-	-	–	-
Otsuka Corporation Alphas	2016-17	42	24	18	.571	4th in B3	10	1	9	.100	6th in Final stage
Otsuka Corporation Alphas	2017-18	42	27	15	.643	2nd in B3	20	13	7	.650	2nd in Final stage
