= Ryuzo Anzai =

Japanese basketball player and coach

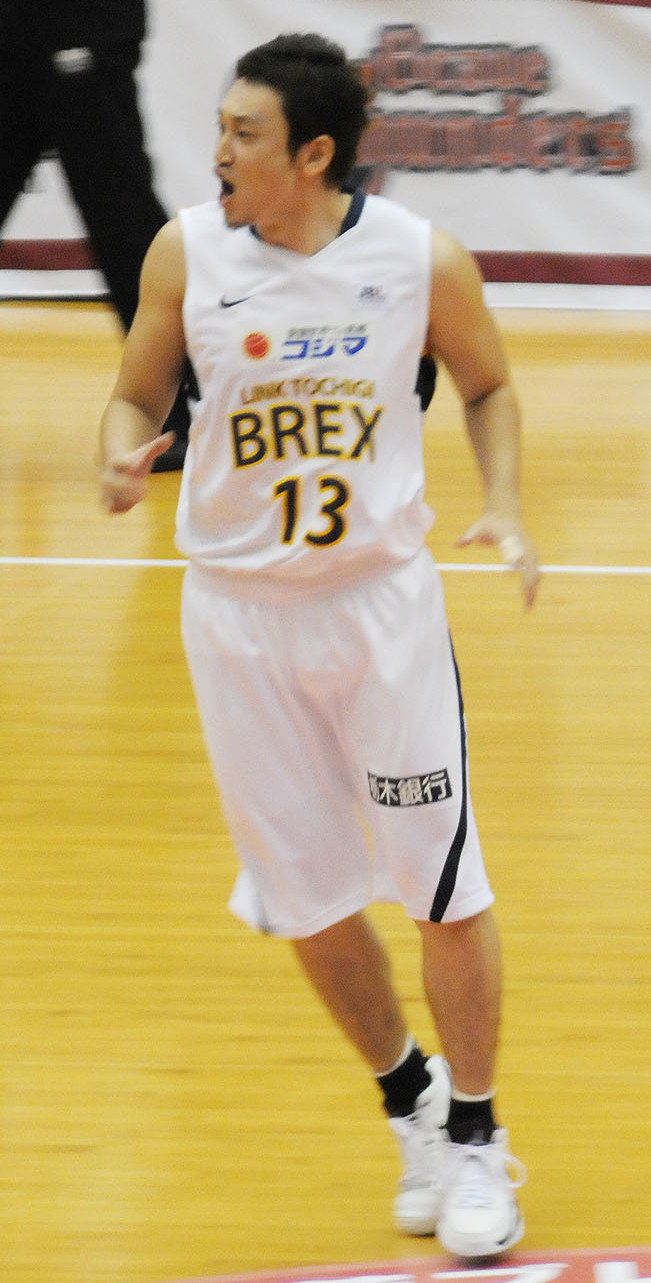

Koshigaya Alphas
- Position: Head coach
- League: B.League

Personal information
- Born: November 10, 1980 (age 46) Fukushima, Fukushima
- Listed height: 178 cm (5 ft 10 in)
- Listed weight: 83 kg (183 lb)

Career information
- High school: Fukushima Technical (Fukushima, Fukushima)
- College: Takushoku University
- Playing career: 2003–2013

Career history

Playing
- 2003-2004: Okura Sanko
- 2004-2005: Otsuka Corporation Alphas
- 2005-2007: Saitama Broncos
- 2007-2013: Link Tochigi Brex

Coaching
- 2013–2017: Link Tochigi Brex (asst.)
- 2017–2022: Link Tochigi Brex
- 2022–2023: Koshigaya Alphas (advisor)
- 2023–: Koshigaya Alphas

Career highlights
- JBL2 champion (2008); JBL champion (2010); B.League champion (2017)

Ryuzo Anzai (安齋竜三, Anzai Ryūzō; born November 10, 1980) is a Japanese professional basketball coach and former player, who is the head coach for the Koshigaya Alphas of the B.League. He played college basketball for Takushoku University. He was selected by the Saitama Broncos with the second overall pick in the 2005 bj League draft.

== Career statistics ==
Legend
GP	Games played	GS	Games started	MPG	Minutes per game
FG%	Field goal percentage	3P%	3-point field goal percentage	FT%	Free throw percentage
RPG	Rebounds per game	APG	Assists per game	SPG	Steals per game
BPG	Blocks per game	PPG	Points per game	**Bold**	Career high

Year	Team	GP	GS	MPG	FG%	3P%	FT%	RPG	APG	SPG	BPG	PPG
2005-13	Saitama/Tochigi	260		16.6	.398	.370	.636	1.5	1.5	0.6	0.0	4.2

== Head coaching record ==
Legend
Regular season	G	Games coached	W	Games won	L	Games lost	W–L %	Win–loss %
Playoffs	PG	Playoff games	PW	Playoff wins	PL	Playoff losses	PW–L %	Playoff win–loss %

Team	Year	G	W	L	W–L%	Finish	PG	PW	PL	PW–L%	Result
Tochigi	2017-18	47	30	17	.638	4th in Eastern	2	0	2	.000	Lost in 1st round
Tochigi	2018-19	60	49	11	.817	2nd in Eastern	4	2	2	.500	Lost in 2nd round
Utsunomiya	2019-20	40	31	9	.775	2nd in Eastern	-	-	-	–	-

== Personal life ==
Anzai has been married to Mari Konno, a former basketball player.
