= Koshigaya Alphas =

- Conference: East
- Division: First
- Leagues: B.League
- Founded: 1997
- History: Otsuka Corporation Alphas (1997–2018); Otsuka Corporation Koshigaya Alphas (2018–2019); Koshigaya Alphas (2019–present)
- Arena: Koshigaya Municipal General Gymnasium
- Capacity: 4,472
- Location: Koshigaya, Saitama
- General manager: Kazuto Aono
- Head coach: Ryuzo Anzai
- Website: www.koshigaya-alphas.com
| Home | Away |

The Koshigaya Alphas (越谷アルファーズ, Koshigaya Arufāzu) are a Japanese professional basketball team based in Koshigaya. The team most recently competed in the first division of the B.League. Starting from the 2026–27 season, the team will compete in the B.League One, the league's second division, as a member of the Northern Conference.

== Coaches ==
- Yoshinori Kaneta
- Kenji Okamura
- Kazuto Aono (2013–20)
- Junpei Takahara (2020–21)
- Sho Higashijima (2021–23)
- Ryuzo Anzai (2023–)

== Current roster ==
Koshigaya Alphas roster
Players
Coaches

| Pos. | No. | Nat. | Name |
|---|---|---|---|
| PF | 1 | (United States) | Jarell Martin |
| PG | 4 | (Japan) | Kaito Shike |
| PG | 5 | (Kazakhstan) | Anthony Clemmons |
| PG | 7 | (Japan) | Shun Matsuyama |
| SF | 8 | (Japan) | Joseph Diawara |
| F | 10 | (Japan) | Kazuya Mitsui |
| C | 11 | (Philippines) | Kai Sotto |
| PG | 12 | (Japan) | Yuichi Ikeda |
| G | 14 | (Japan) | Takeru Oba |
| PF | 18 | (Japan) | Yuya Kamata |
| SF | 20 | (New Zealand) | Jordan Ngatai |
| SF | 21 | (United States) | Jeffrey Parmer |
| PG | 23 | (Japan) | Kanta Inada |
| SF | 28 | (Japan) | Kai Sugawara |
| SF | 31 | (Japan) | Shuhei Kitagawa |
| F | 45 | (France) | Sekou Doumbouya |

Head coach

(Japan) Ryuzo Anzai

Assistant coach(es)

(Japan)

Legend

- (C) Team captain
- Injured

- Roster
Updated: 8 April 2026

== Notable players ==
Former logo

- Ryuzo Anzai
- James Blasczyk
- Luke Evans (fr)
- Takeshi Hasegawa
- Drew Naymick
- Raymond Nixon
- Daisuke Noguchi
- Kenji Okamura
- Daniel Orton
- Kyle Richardson
- Hiroki Sato
- Daisuke Takaoka
- Kenji Yamada

== Arenas ==
- Koshigaya Municipal General Gymnasium
- Brex Arena Utsunomiya
- Saitama Prefectural University
- Dokkyo University
- Bunkyo University
- Wing Hat Kasukabe
- Koshigaya City Minami Gymnasium
- Mainichi Kogyo Arena Kuki
- Gyoda City General Gymnasium
- Kisai General Gymnasium Fuji Arena
