= Jason Rabedeaux =

American basketball player-coach

Biographical details
- Born: April 4, 1965; Aurora, Illinois, U.S.
- Died: September 22, 2014 (aged 49); Ho Chi Minh City, Vietnam

Playing career
- 1984–1988: UC Davis

Coaching career (HC unless noted)
- 1988–1989: North Adams State (asst.)
- 1989–1994: Washington State (asst.)
- 1994–1999: Oklahoma (asst.)
- 1999–2002: UTEP
- 2004–2008: Marquette (asst.)
- 2008–2010: Jiangsu Dragons
- 2010: Link Tochigi Brex
- 2011: Al-Manama
- 2011: Saigon Heat (asst.)
- 2012: Sichuan Blue Whales
- 2012–2014: Saigon Heat

Head coaching record
- Overall: 46–46 (.500)

Accomplishments and honors

Championships
- Bahrain Cup (2011); Bahrain Super Cup (2011)

Awards
- WAC Coach of the Year (2001)

Jason Rabedeaux (April 4, 1965 – September 22, 2014) was an American college basketball coach who served as the head coach of the UTEP Miners from 1999 to 2002. Rabedeaux was also a top assistant at Washington State and Oklahoma prior to becoming UTEP's head coach.

== Early life ==
Rabedeaux was born in Aurora, Illinois, and moved to Eau Claire, Wisconsin when he was seven.

Rabedeaux attended Eau Claire Memorial High School, playing basketball, American football and baseball; he quarterbacked the Old Abes to the state semifinals in his senior year, while earning All-State in basketball and baseball. He was a walk on at the University of California, Davis, and was named all-conference twice. He ended his UC Davis career with 1,112 points, 15th-most in school history. He holds the school record for the three-pointers in a season (80), most three-pointers in a game (six) and most free throws in a game (14). In 1995, he was inducted into the UC Davis Aggies Athletics Hall of Fame. Rabedeaux held a bachelor's degree in exercise physiology, and at Washington State in 1991, earned a master's degree in athletic administration.

== Coaching career ==
Upon finishing his college career, Rabedeaux spent a season as an assistant coach with North Adams State College, then joined Washington State, working with Kelvin Sampson as a graduate assistant (1989–1991) and eventually assistant coach (1992–1994). When Sampson went to Oklahoma, Rabedeaux followed him, working as an assistant coach. With Rabedeaux, the Sooners averaged 20.6 wins over five years, qualifying for the NCAA Tournament each year, including a Sweet 16 appearance in 1999.

Rabedeaux, who had served as recruiting director with North Adams, Washington State and Oklahoma, established himself as one of the top recruiters in the nation. Two of his recruits, Nate Erdmann and Corey Brewer, were later drafted by the Utah Jazz and Miami Heat in 1997 and 1998 respectively. Rabedeaux's recruiting also extended into Mexico, with recruit Eduardo Nájera becoming a 2000 Wooden Award candidate.

On September 10, 1999, Rabedeaux was hired by UTEP to replace Hall of Fame coach Don Haskins. In his first year, the Miners, with a lack of depth, finished 13–15, six of their losses being by less than three points; the Miners also swept the New Mexico Lobos for the first time in 14 years, and won at the Lobos' home arena, The Pit, the first such win for the Miners in nine seasons. In 2000, the Miners improved to 23–9 with a 10–6 record against conference opponents, while also qualifying for the NIT for the first time in six years. The team ranked seventh in the country in points per game with a school-best 80.3, while leading the Western Athletic Conference in scoring with 22.3 points per game. UTEP also finished seventh in field goal percentage (.492), 14th in free throw percentage (.753) and 17th in scoring offense. At the end of the year, he was named the WAC Coach of the Year by the Sporting News and Houston Chronicle. However, in 2002, UTEP struggled, finishing 10–22. Despite receiving a contract extension through 2007, on October 21, he announced his resignation due to "personal reasons".

In 2004, Rabedeaux was hired by Tom Crean as a coach at Marquette. In 2007, he became the school's Director of Basketball Operations.

In 2008, he joined the Jiangsu Dragons of the Chinese Basketball Association, coaching until 2010, when he was suspended for a year after being involved in a bench-clearing brawl during a playoff game. He later became head coach of the Japan Basketball League's Link Tochigi Brex. However, the team, who had been the league's defending champions, went 8–12, and Rabedeaux was fired in December 2010. In 2011, he was hired by the Al-Manama of the Bahrain Premier League, winning the Bahrain Cup and Bahrain Super Cup, though much of his players left the team to join the army due to an uprising. In late 2011, Rabedeaux was hired by the Saigon Heat of the ASEAN Basketball League as an assistant coach under Robert Newson. After seven consecutive losses, Newson was demoted, and on February 23, Rabedeaux was promoted to head coach. During his tenure with the Heat, he coached in China to earn more money. His final game with the Heat was a 72–61 win over the Indonesia Warriors.

== Personal life and death ==
Rabedeaux and his ex-wife Stephanie had two sons, Beau and Cole, and a daughter, Riley.

Beginning during the final year of his coaching career at UTEP, Rabedeaux struggled with alcoholism; After his divorce, Rabedeaux began gaining a significant amount of weight, reaching as high as 300 pounds (140 kg).

In Vietnam, Rabedeaux met Hong-Nhung Nguyen, nicknamed Eva by foreigners, and the two began a relationship, with plans to marry and return to the United States. After Rabedeaux returned from a trip to Wisconsin, his behavior, which included becoming increasingly hostile and smelling of alcohol, attracted the attention of Heat owner Connor Nguyen, who warned him that should he cause another incident, he would be fired. Nguyen had hired Tony Garbelotto as an assistant and potential interim coach. During games, he appeared to be unstable and dizzy; during his final game against the Warriors, he attempted to draw a play, but was unable to, and Garbelotto had to explain the play.

The day after the game, Rabedeaux was found by Eva in the kitchen with cuts on his arms and head, and died while in a local taxicab. His death certificate listed the reason of death as a traumatic brain injury. Toxicology reports revealed that Rabedeaux had been sober at the time of his death.

Rabedeaux's funeral was held at the Congregational United Church of Christ in Eau Claire, with Sampson delivering the eulogy.

== Head coaching record ==
Record table
| Season | Team | Overall | Conference | Standing | Postseason |
|---|---|---|---|---|---|
UTEP Miners (Western Athletic Conference) (1999–2002)
| 1999–00 | UTEP | 13–15 | 4–10 | 7th | |
| 2000–01 | UTEP | 23–9 | 10–6 | 2nd | NIT Second Round |
| 2001–02 | UTEP | 10–22 | 3–15 | 10th | |
| UTEP: | | 46–46 (.500) | 17–31 (.354) | | |
| Total: | | 46–46 (.500) | | | |
National champion Postseason invitational champion Conference regular season champion Conference regular season and conference tournament champion Division regular season champion Division regular season and conference tournament champion Conference tournament champion

Legend
| Regular season | G | Games coached | W | Games won | L | Games lost | W–L % | Win–loss % |
| Playoffs | PG | Playoff games | PW | Playoff wins | PL | Playoff losses | PW–L % | Playoff win–loss % |

| Team | Year | G | W | L | W–L% | Finish | PG | PW | PL | PW–L% | Result |
|---|---|---|---|---|---|---|---|---|---|---|---|
| Link Tochigi Brex | 2010 | 20 | 8 | 12 | .400 | Fired | - | - | - | – | - |
