= TKC Strawberry Arena =

Arena in Kanuma, Tochigi, Japan

Coordinates: 36°30′37.6″N 139°47′57.8″E

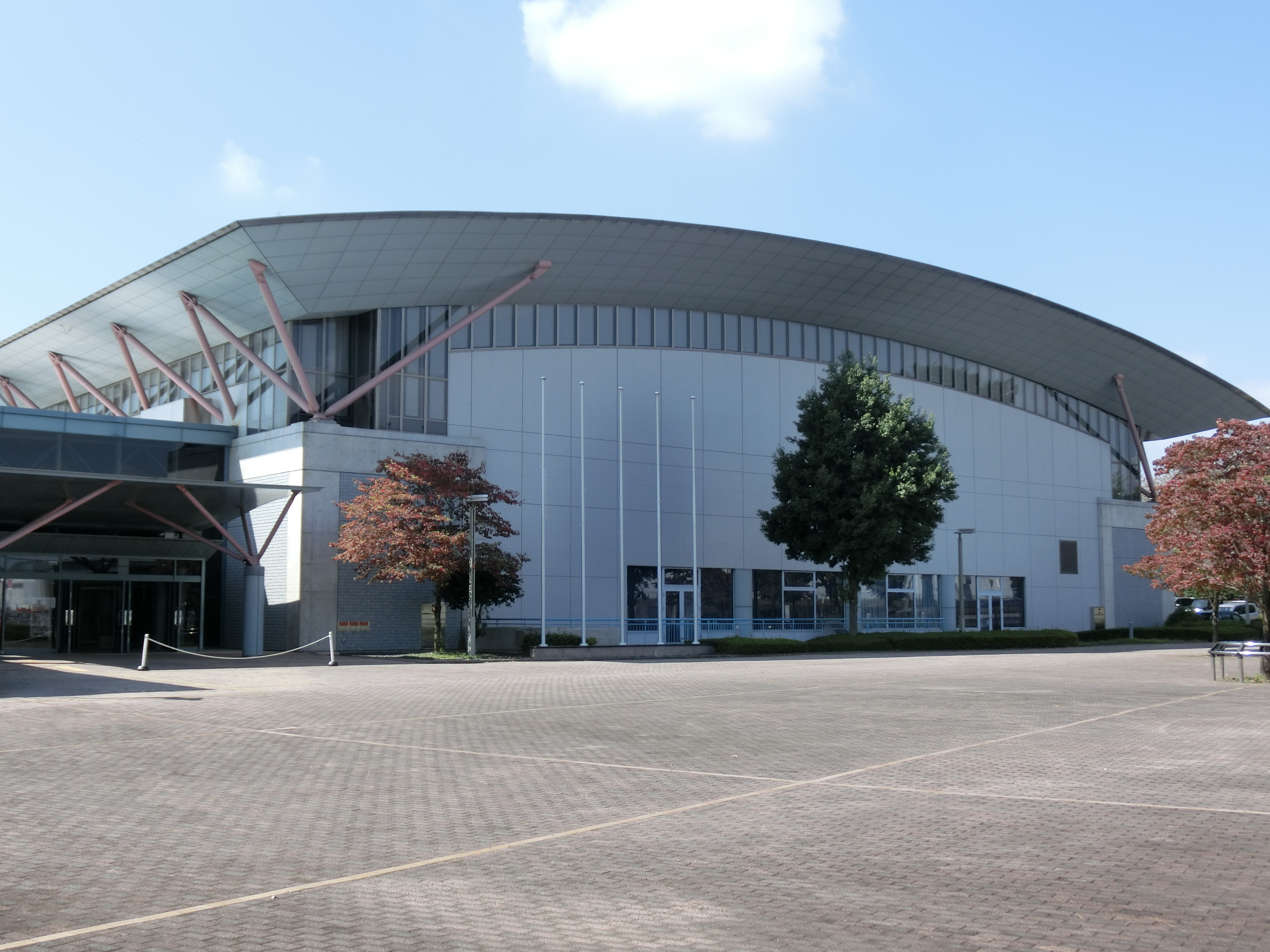
- Interactive map of TKC Strawberry Arena
- Full name: Kanuma General Gymnasium
- Location: Kanuma, Tochigi, Japan
- Owner: Kanuma city
- Operator: Kanuma Culture & Sports Foundation
- Capacity: 2,260

Construction
- Opened: 1998
- Cost

Tenant
- Link Tochigi Brex

Website
- http://www.bc9.ne.jp/~forest/

TKC Strawberry Arena is an arena in Kanuma, Tochigi, Japan. It is the practice facilities of the Link Tochigi Brex of the B.League, Japan's professional basketball league.

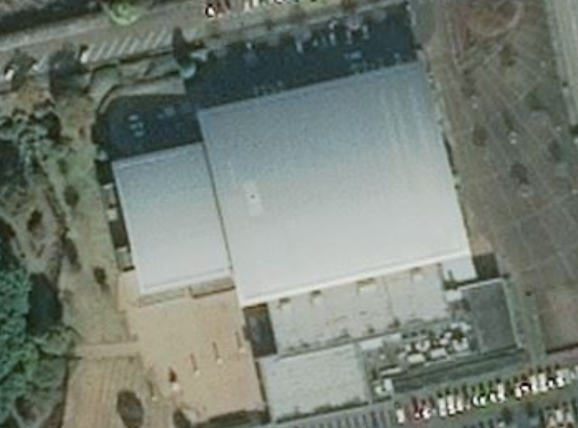
Satellite view
