= Kenji Okamura =

Japanese basketball player and coach

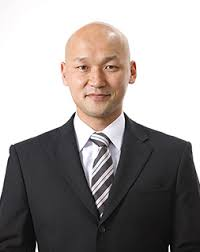

No. 44 – Cyberdyne Ibaraki Robots
- Position: Supervising coach
- League: B.League

Personal information
- Born: May 2, 1973 (age 53) Kyoto Prefecture
- Listed height: 190 cm (6 ft 3 in)
- Listed weight: 88 kg (194 lb)

Career information
- High school: Rakunan (Kyoto, Kyoto)
- College: Nihon University
- Playing career: 1996–2017

Career history

Playing
- 1996-1998: Japan Energy Griffins
- 1998-2002: Zexel/Bosch Blue Winds
- 2002-2004: Mitsubishi Electric
- 2004-2011: Chiba Pias Arrow Badgers/Exdreams
- 2015-2016: Otsuka Corporation Alphas
- 2016-present: Cyberdyne Ibaraki Robots

Coaching
- 2005-2006: Chiba Pias Arrow Badgers (asst)
- 2006-2007: Chiba Pias Arrow Badgers
- 2010-2012: Otsuka Corporation Alphas (asst)
- 2012-2013: Otsuka Corporation Alphas
- 2013-2016: Yamanashi Gakuin University
- 2016-2017: Cyberdyne Ibaraki Robots (asst)
- 2017-present: Cyberdyne Ibaraki Robots

Kenji Okamura (岡村憲司, Okamura Kenji) is the Supervising coach of the Cyberdyne Ibaraki Robots in the Japanese B.League.

== Head coaching record ==
Legend
Regular season	G	Games coached	W	Games won	L	Games lost	W–L %	Win–loss %
Playoffs	PG	Playoff games	PW	Playoff wins	PL	Playoff losses	PW–L %	Playoff win–loss %

Team	Year	G	W	L	W–L%	Finish	PG	PW	PL	PW–L%	Result
Otsuka Corporation Alphas	2012-13	32	13	19	.406	4th in Eastern	-	-	-	–	-
Cyberdyne Ibaraki Robots	2017-18	60	38	22	.633	2nd in B2 Central	-	-	-	–	-
