= Koshigaya Municipal General Gymnasium =

Arena in Koshigaya, Saitama, Japan

Coordinates: 35°54′9.7″N 139°48′49.5″E

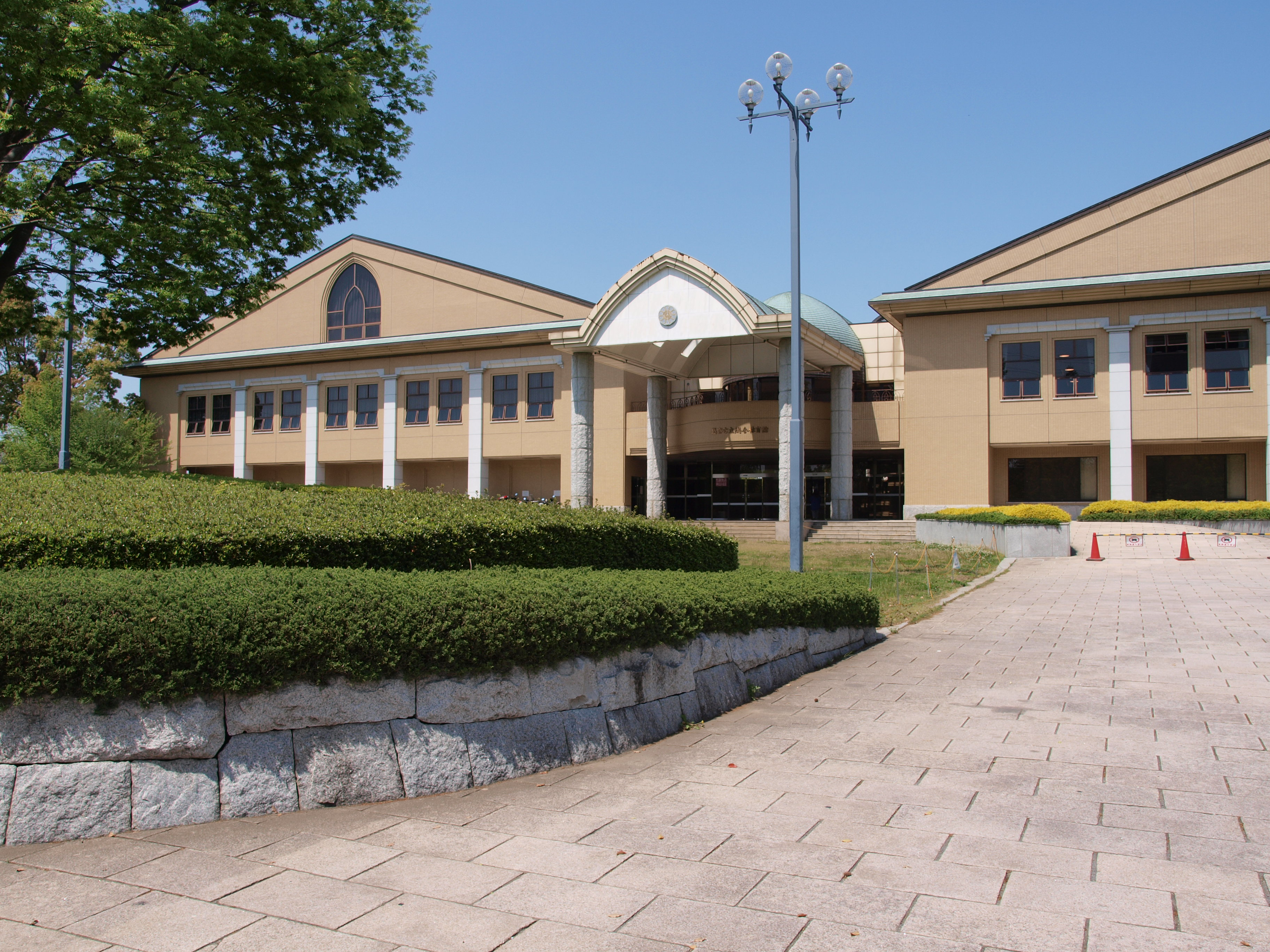
- Interactive map of Koshigaya Municipal General Gymnasium
- Full name: Koshigaya Municipal General Gymnasium
- Location: Koshigaya, Saitama, Japan
- Owner: Koshigaya city
- Operator: Koshigaya city
- Capacity: 4,472

Construction
- Opened: September, 1987
- Cost

Tenant
- Koshigaya Alphas

Koshigaya Municipal General Gymnasium is an arena in Koshigaya, Saitama, Japan. It is the home arena of the Koshigaya Alphas of the B.League, Japan's professional basketball league.

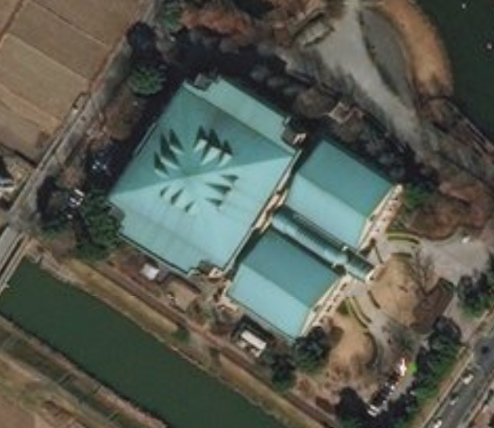
Satellite view
