= Scott Berry (basketball) =

American basketball coach (born 1959)

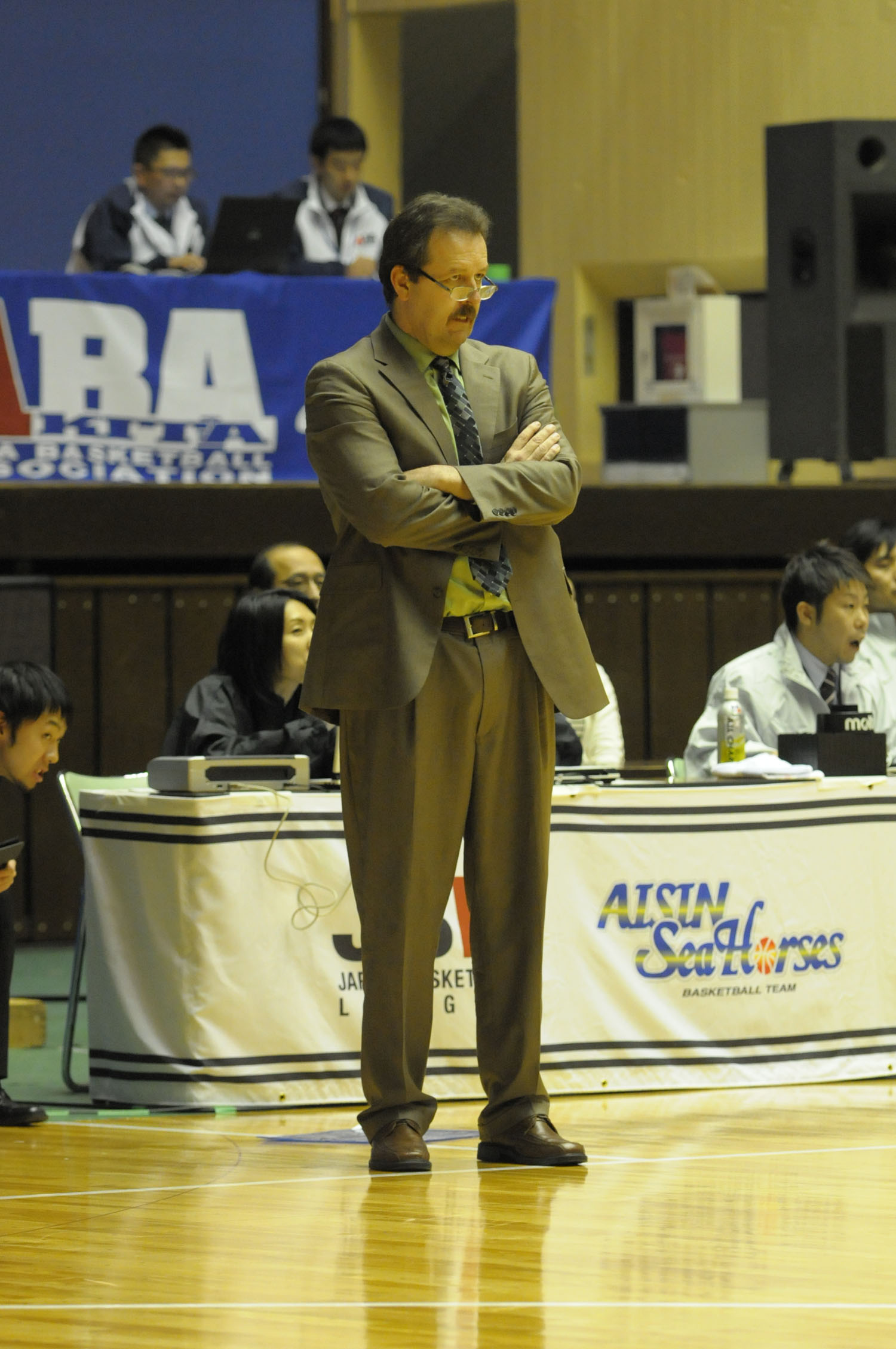
- Berry in 2013

Personal information
- Born: September 12, 1959 (age 67) Livingston, Montana, U.S.
- Listed height: 193 cm (6 ft 4 in)
- Listed weight: 120 kg (265 lb)

Career information
- College: Heritage College (1994–95); Central Washington University (1976–80)
- Position: Head coach

Career history

Coaching
- 1999–2003: Yakima Valley Community College
- 2004–2007: Dickinson State College
- 2012–2013: Levanga Hokkaido

Career highlights
- NWAACC champion (2003)

Scott Berry (スコット・ベリー, Sukotto Berī; born September 12, 1959) is an American basketball coach, the former head coach of the Levanga Hokkaido in the Japan Basketball League (JBL).

== Head coaching record ==
Legend
Regular season	G	Games coached	W	Games won	L	Games lost	W–L %	Win–loss %
Playoffs	PG	Playoff games	PW	Playoff wins	PL	Playoff losses	PW–L %	Playoff win–loss %

Team	Year	G	W	L	W–L%	Finish	PG	PW	PL	PW–L%	Result
Levanga Hokkaido	2012-13	42	6	36	.143	8th	-	-	-	–	-
