= Takeshi Hasegawa =

Japanese basketball player

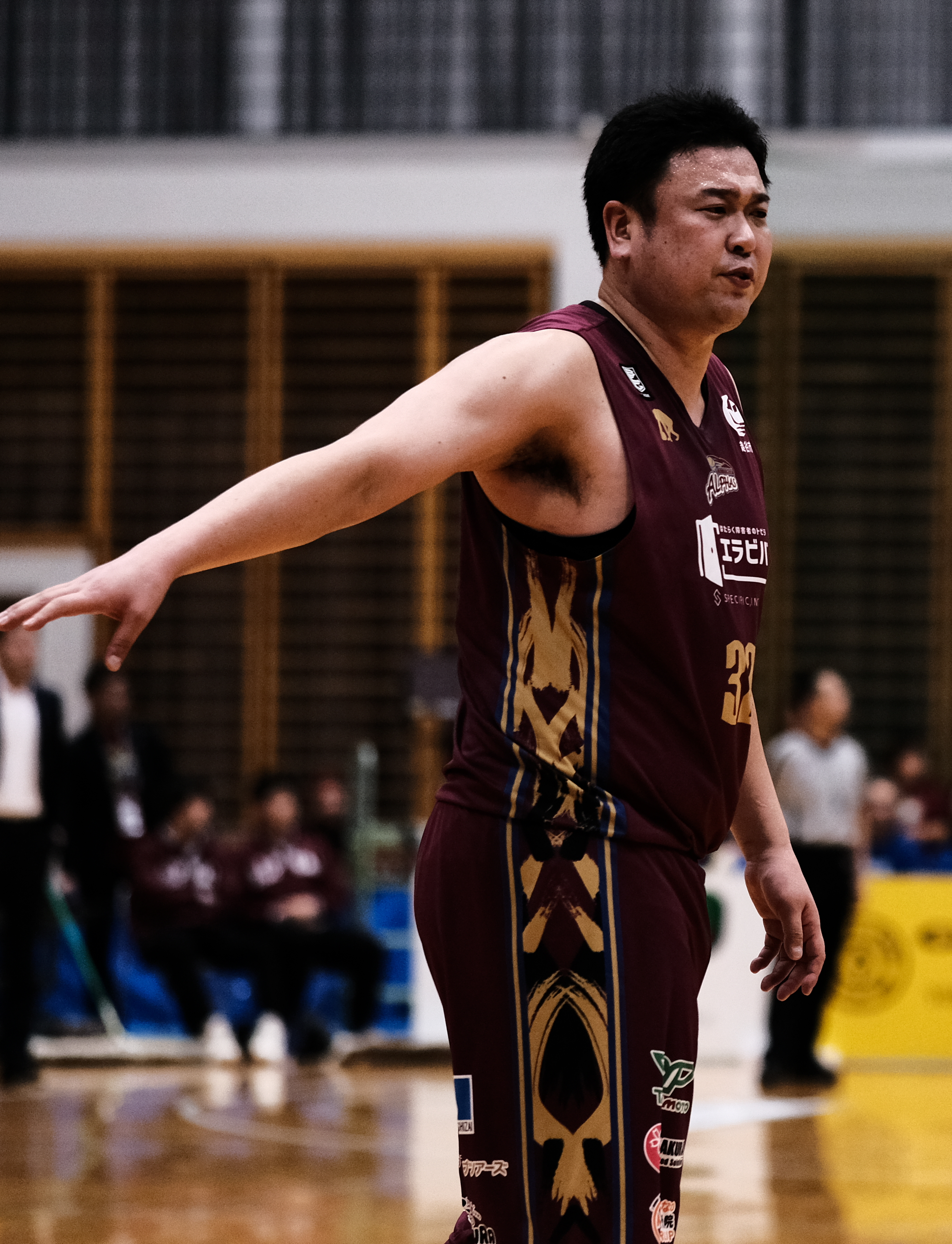
- Hasegawa in 2019

No. 32 – Koshigaya Alphas
- Position: Forward/Center
- League: B.League

Personal information
- Born: August 1, 1984 (age 42) Hanamaki, Iwate
- Listed height: 6 ft 5 in (1.96 m)
- Listed weight: 254 lb (115 kg)

Career information
- High school: Kurosawajiri Technical (Kitakami, Iwate)
- College: Takushoku University

Career history
- 2007-2008: OSG
- 2008-2010: Chiba Pierce Arrow Badgers
- 2010-present: Otsuka Corporation Alphas

Takeshi Hasegawa (長谷川 武, Hasegawa Takeshi; born August 1, 1984) is a Japanese professional basketball player who plays for the Koshigaya Alphas of the B.League in Japan. He played for Japan national 3x3 team in 2013.

== Personal ==
His younger brother Takumi Hasegawa plays for the Kawasaki Brave Thunders of the B.League.
