= Takehiko Orimo =

Japanese basketball player

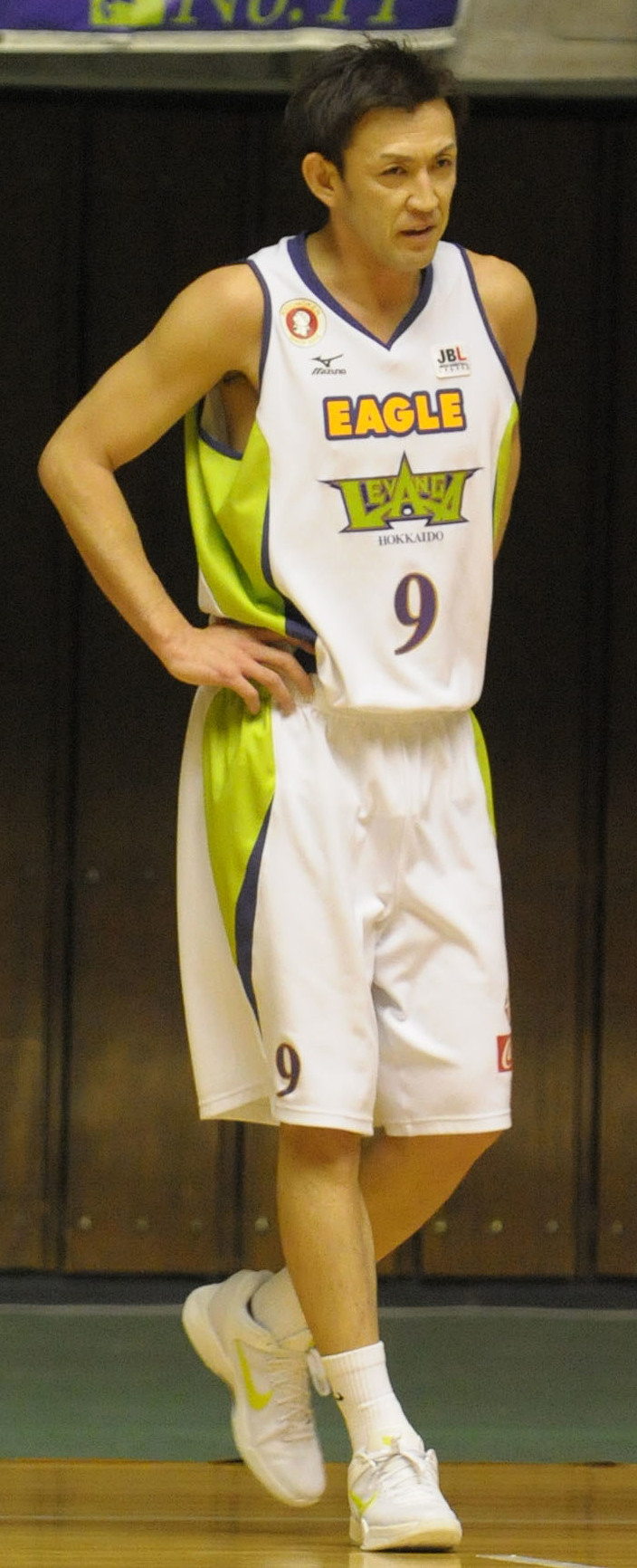
- Orimo (2013)

Levanga Hokkaido
- Position: President
- League: B.League

Personal information
- Born: May 14, 1970 (age 56) Ageo, Saitama
- Listed height: 6 ft 3 in (1.91 m)
- Listed weight: 170 lb (77 kg)

Career information
- High school: Saitama Sakae (Saitama, Saitama)
- College: Nihon University
- Playing career: 1993–2020

Career history
- 1993–2007: Toyota Alvark
- 2007-2011: Rera Kamuy Hokkaido
- 2011-2020: Levanga Hokkaido

Career highlights
- As player: 2x JBL Best 5; 2x JBL All-star MVP
Medals
Men's basketball
Representing Japan
Asian Games
Bronze medal – third place	1994 Hiroshima	Japan
William Jones Cup
Bronze medal – third place	2002 Taipei	Team
FIBA Asia Championship
Silver medal – second place	2009 Tianjin	Team competition

Takehiko Orimo (折茂 武彦, Orimo Takehiko; born 14 May 1970) is a Japanese former professional basketball player. He became the first Japanese player to reach 10,000 points in the history of the men's top league.

== Post Career ==
Orimo is now the head president of the Levanga Hokkaido
