= Asahikawa City General Gymnasium =

Arena in Asahikawa, Hokkaido, Japan

Coordinates: 43°47′35″N 142°22′35″E

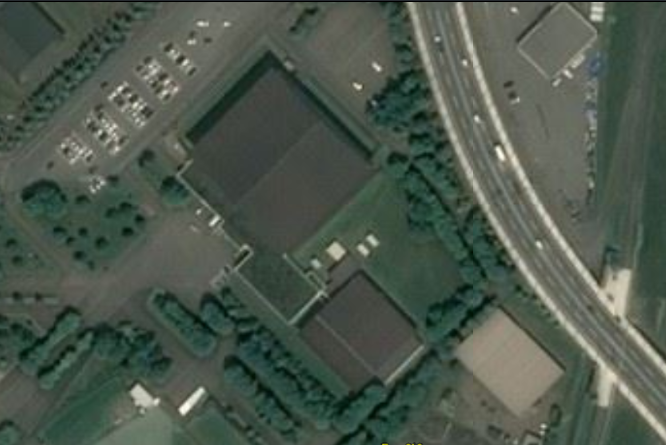
- Interactive map of Asahikawa City General Gymnasium
- Full name: Asahikawa City General Gymnasium
- Location: Asahikawa, Hokkaido, Japan
- Owner: Asahikawa city
- Operator: Asahikawa city
- Capacity: 1,494

Construction
- Opened: October 10, 1979; 47 years ago
- Cost

Asahikawa City General Gymnasium is an arena in Asahikawa, Hokkaido, Japan.
