= Yotsuba Arena Tokachi =

Arena in Obihiro, Hokkaido, Japan

Coordinates: 42°56′00″N 143°12′10″E

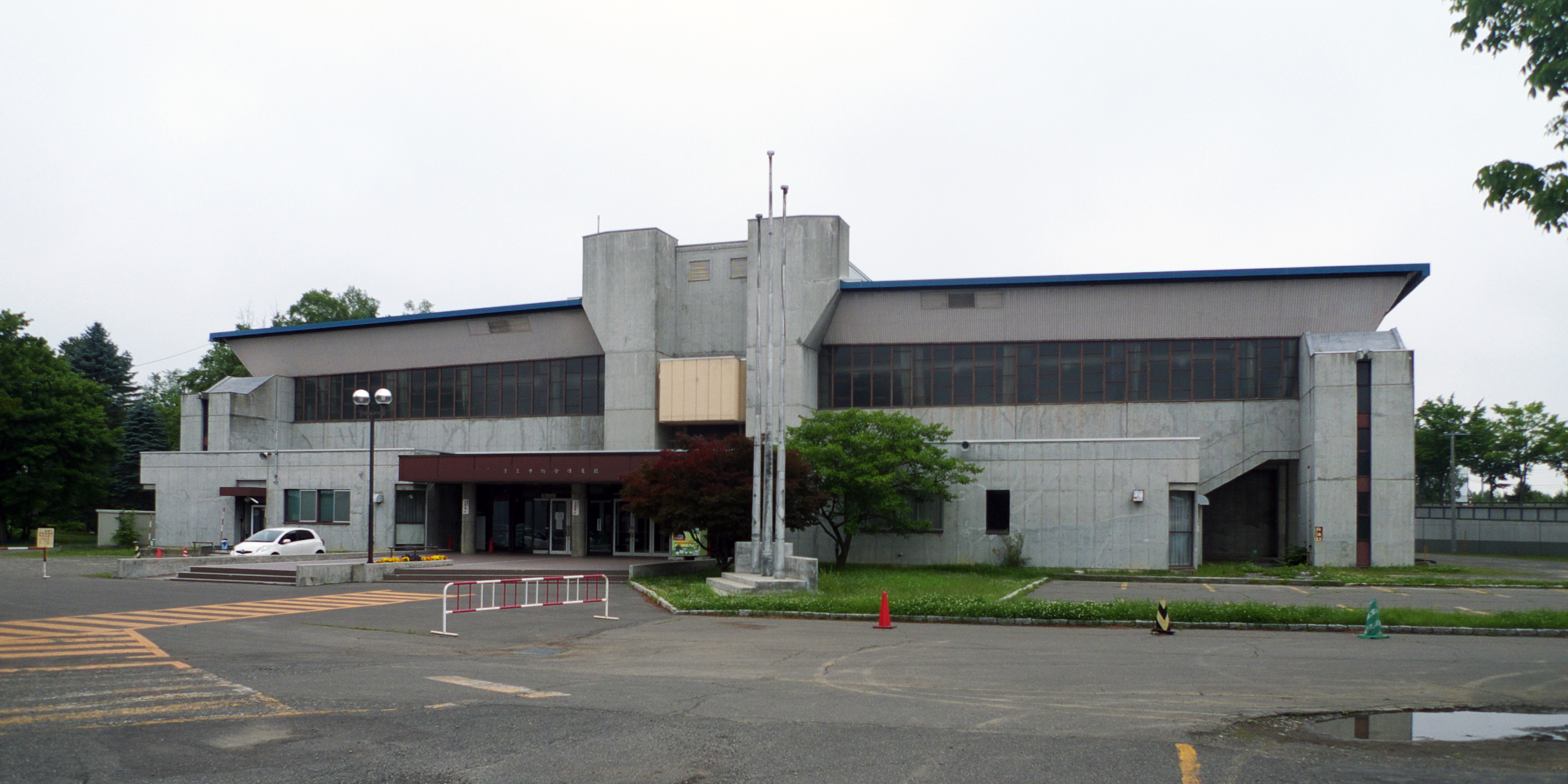
- Former building
- Interactive map of Yotsuba Arena Tokachi
- Full name: Obihiro City General Gymnasium
- Location: Obihiro, Hokkaido, Japan
- Owner: Obihiro city
- Operator: Obihiro city
- Capacity: 2833
- Parking: 114

Construction
- Opened: September 15, 1972
- Cost: JPY 425.7 million

Website
- https://www.obihiro-arena.jp/en/

Yotsuba Arena Tokachi is an arena in Obihiro, Hokkaido, Japan.

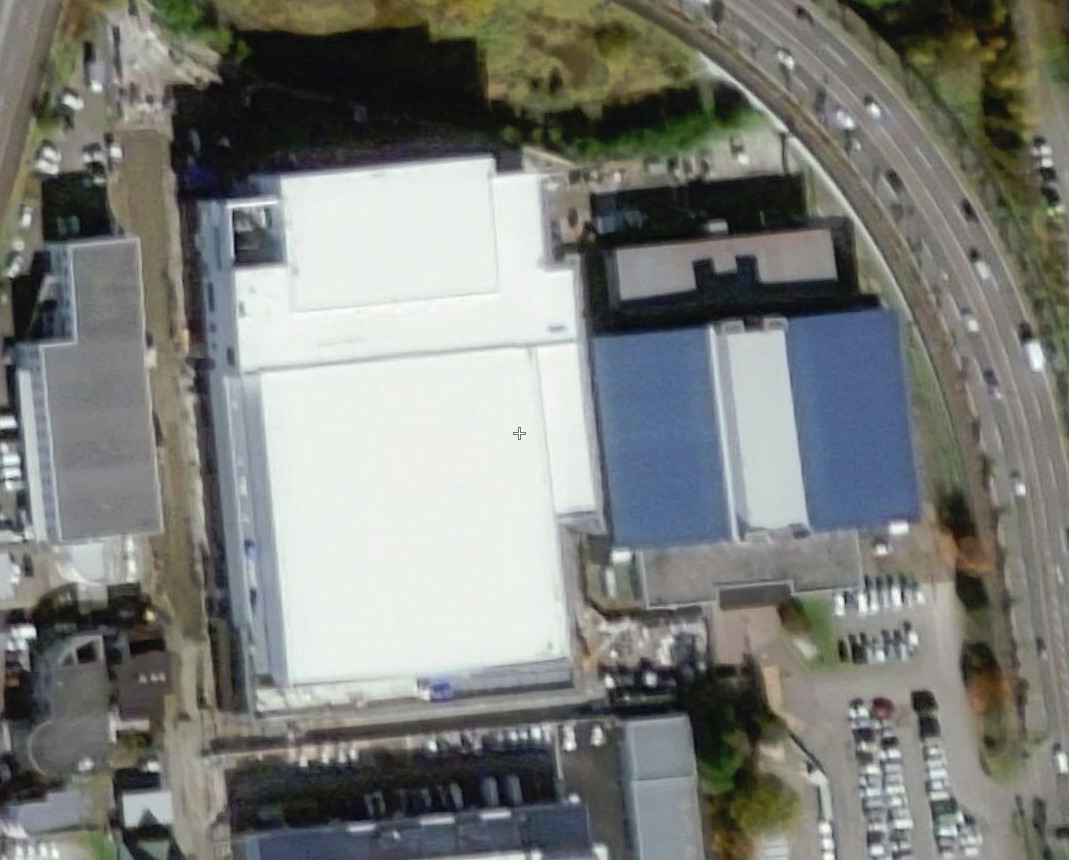
Satellite view
