= Tochigi Prefectural South Gymnasium =

Arena in Oyama, Tochigi, Japan

Coordinates: 36°18′3.9″N 139°47′0.7″E

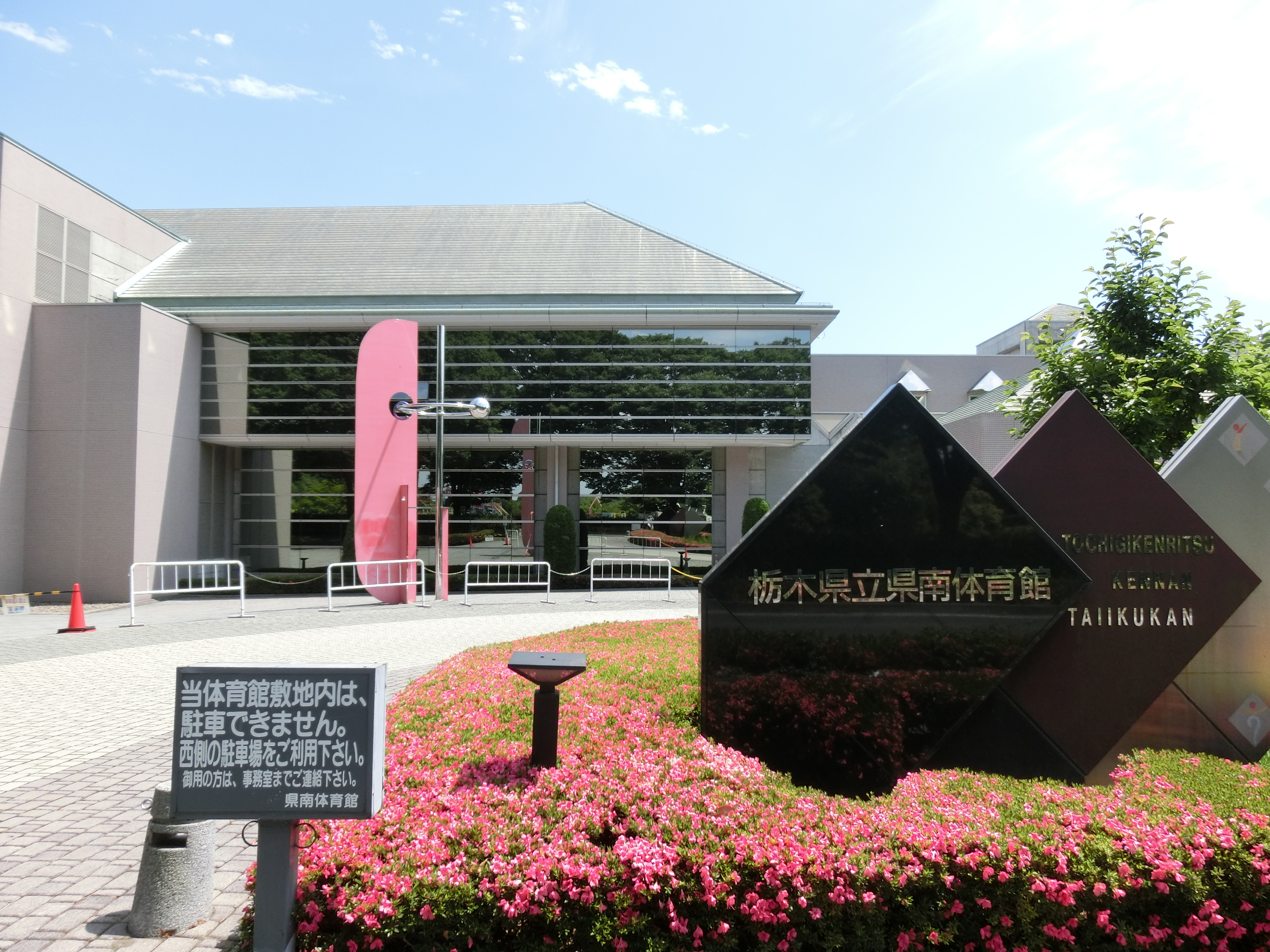
- Interactive map of Tochigi Prefectural South Gymnasium
- Full name: Tochigi Prefectural South Gymnasium 栃木県立県南体育館
- Location: Oyama, Tochigi, Japan
- Owner: Tochigi Prefecture
- Operator: Tochigi Prefecture
- Capacity: 2,020

Construction
- Opened: July 1993; 33 years ago
- Cost

Website
- http://www.pref.tochigi.lg.jp/m07/education/sports/shisetsu/kennantaiikukan.html

Tochigi Prefectural South Gymnasium is an arena in Oyama, Tochigi, Japan.

== Overview ==
The Tochigi Prefectural South Gymnasium provides a variety of equipment that aid health, physical training or culture activities .This gymnasium of the prefecture opened as core physical education facility of the prefectural south area that met new sports needs of in July, 1993. It is a facility capable of holding international meeting and national convention and greatly contributes to promotion and the prefecture sports of prefectural total sports and improvement of competition too.

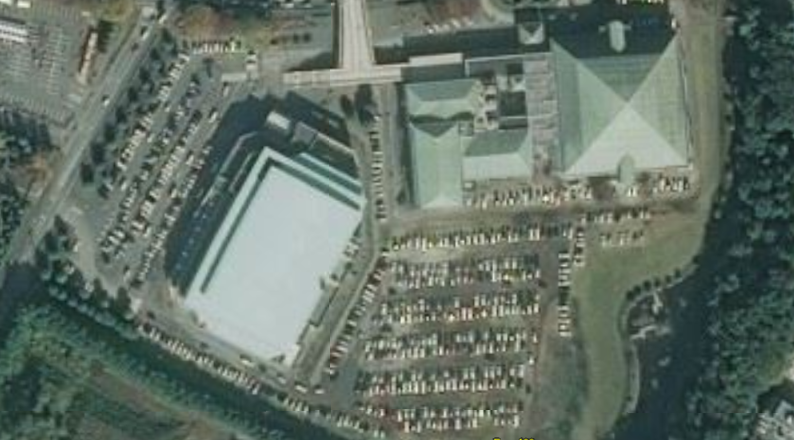
Satellite view
