= Brex Arena Utsunomiya =

Arena in Utsunomiya, Tochigi, Japan

Coordinates: 36°33′40.3″N 139°54′38.5″E

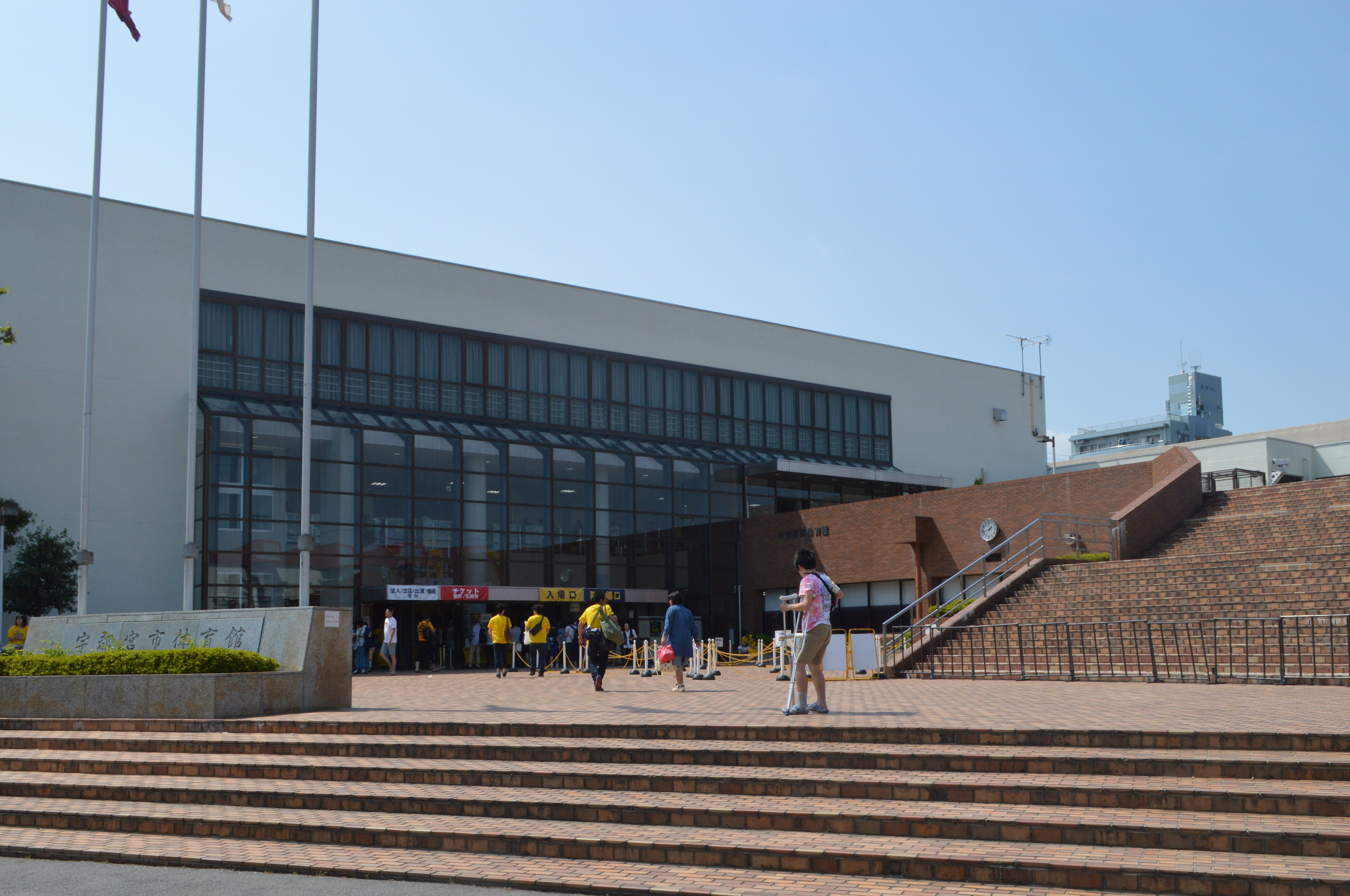

- Location within Tochigi Prefecture Location within Japan
- Interactive map of Brex Arena Utsunomiya
- Full name: Utsunomiya City Gymnasium
- Location: Utsunomiya, Tochigi, Japan
- Owner: Utsunomiya city
- Operator: Utsunomiya city
- Capacity: 2,900

Construction
- Opened: 1979
- Renovated: 2014
- Cost

Tenant
- Link Tochigi Brex

Brex Arena Utsunomiya is an arena in Utsunomiya, Tochigi, Japan. It is the home arena of the Link Tochigi Brex of the B.League, Japan's professional basketball league.

== Facilities ==
- Main arena - 38m×50m
- Sub arena - 28m×34m
- Budojo - 22m×27m

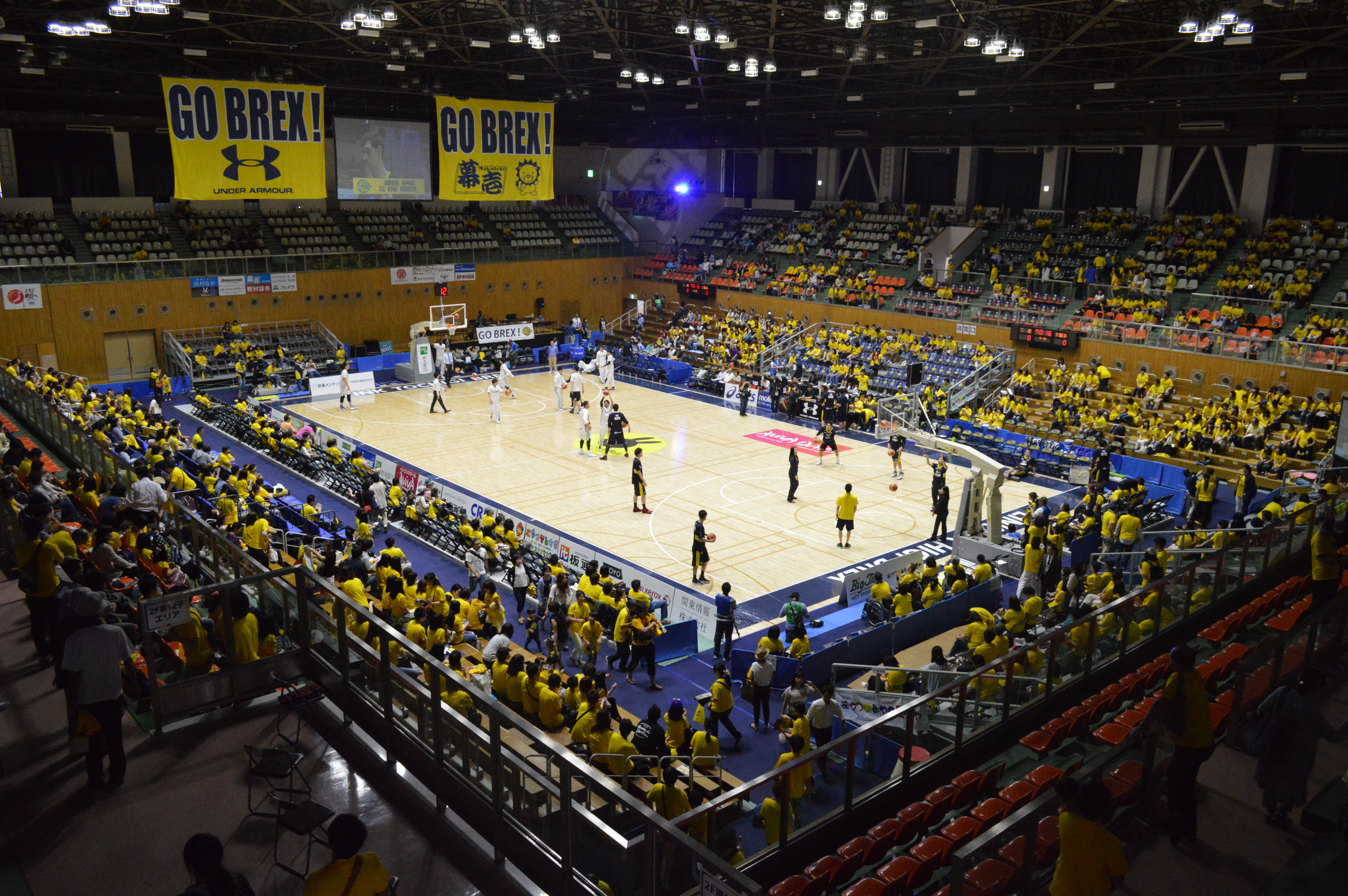
Arena

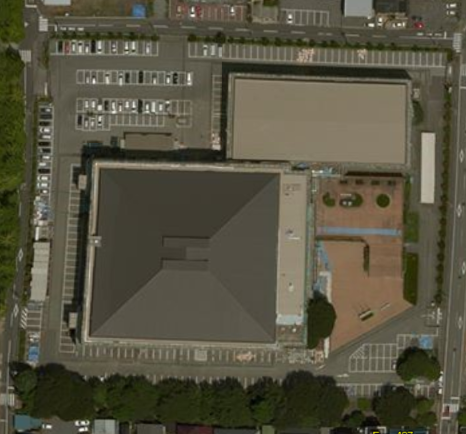
Satellite view
