= Drew Naymick =

American basketball player (born 1985)

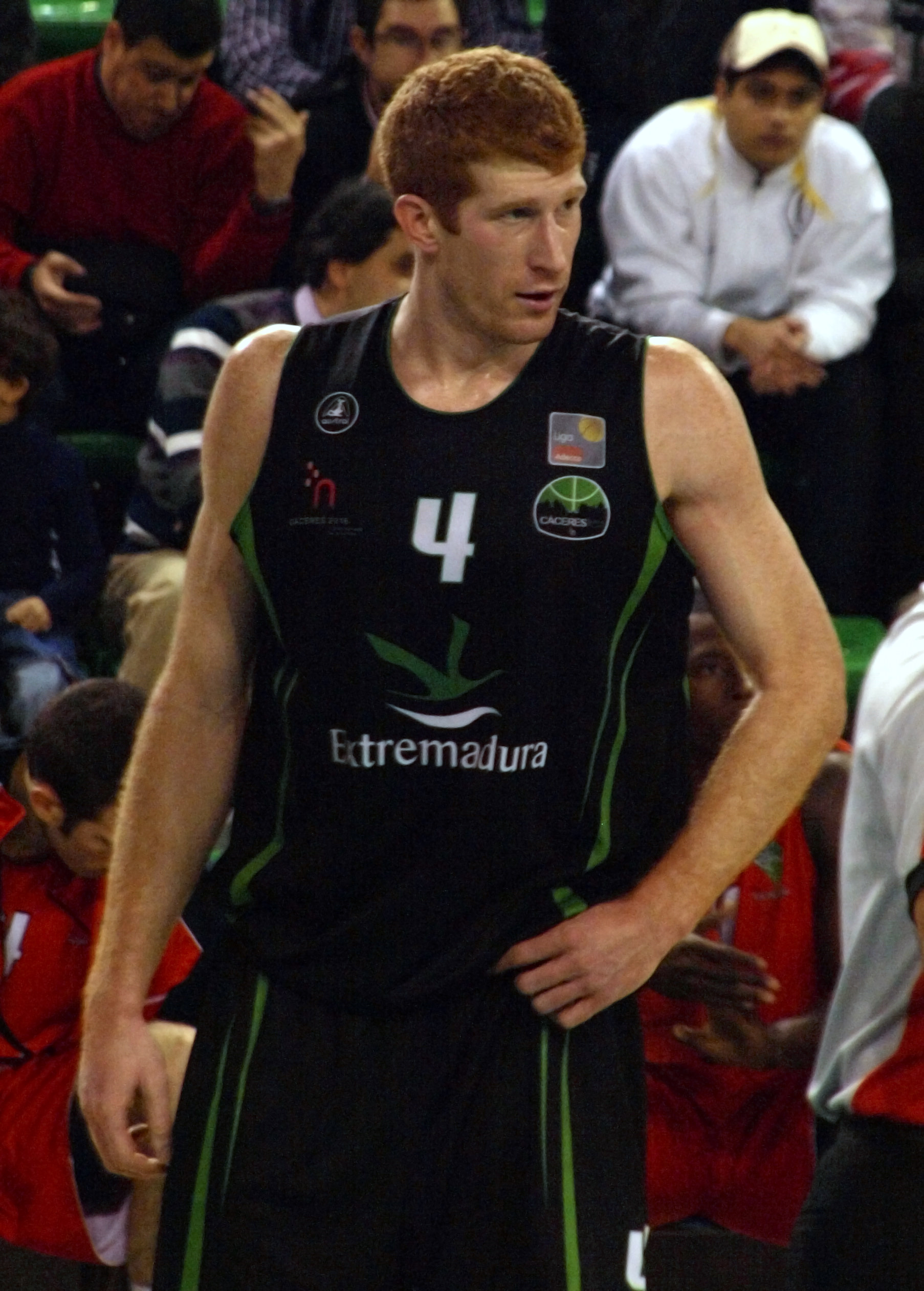
- Naymick with Cáceres in January 2010

Personal information
- Born: February 18, 1985 (age 41) Muskegon, Michigan
- Listed height: 6 ft 10 in (2.08 m)
- Listed weight: 250 lb (113 kg)

Career information
- High school: North Muskegon (Muskegon, Michigan)
- College: Michigan State (2003–2008)
- NBA draft: 2008: undrafted
- Playing career: 2008–2020
- Position: Center

Career history
- 2008–2009: Kotwica Kołobrzeg
- 2009–2010: Cáceres Ciudad del Baloncesto
- 2010–2011: Bakersfield Jam
- 2011–2013: ČEZ Nymburk
- 2014: Soles de Mexicali
- 2014: Atléticos de San Germán
- 2014–2015: Aris Thessaloniki
- 2015–2016: Medi Bayreuth
- 2016: Link Tochigi Brex
- 2016–2017: Alvark Tokyo
- 2017: Stirling Senators
- 2017: Link Tochigi Brex
- 2018: Otsuka Corporation Alphas
- 2018-2019: Link Tochigi Brex
- 2019-2020: Otsuka Corporation Alphas

Career highlights
- Greek League blocks leader (2015); 2× NBL champion (2012, 2013); 2× Czech Republic Cup champion (2012, 2013); Polish Cup champion (2009); Polish League All-Imports Team (2009)

Andrew "Drew" Naymick (born February 18, 1985) is an American professional basketball player for Link Tochigi Brex of the Japanese B.League. He played college basketball for Michigan State.

== College career ==
Over his first two years with Michigan State, Naymick appeared in 51 games as a reserve. He started the first seven games of the 2005–06 season before sitting out the rest of the season due to a shoulder injury, earning a medical redshirt. He returned to the line-up in 2006–07 and appeared in 35 games, starting the final 11 contests of the season. As a senior in 2007–08, he appeared in 36 games, starting 23, including the final 22 contests of the season. He finished his college career as Michigan State's career leader in blocked shots with 134.

== Professional career ==
On July 20, 2008, Naymick signed a one-year contract with Polish team Kotwica Kołobrzeg. He parted ways with the team on March 31, 2009, not before helping Kołobrzeg win the Polish Cup title.

On July 23, 2009, Naymick signed a one-year contract with Spanish team Cáceres Ciudad del Baloncesto.

After spending the 2010 preseason with the Los Angeles Lakers, Naymick joined the Bakersfield Jam of the NBA Development League for the 2010–11 season.

On August 19, 2011, Naymick signed a one-year contract with Czech team ČEZ Nymburk. He re-signed with Nymburk for another season on July 31, 2012.

In early 2014, Naymick had short stints with both Soles de Mexicali and Atléticos de San Germán.

On August 26, 2014, Naymick signed a one-year contract with Greek team Aris Thessaloniki.

On November 6, 2015, Naymick signed a two-month contract with German team Medi Bayreuth.

On January 30, 2016, Naymick signed with Link Tochigi Brex of Japan for the rest of the season.

On August 14, 2016, Naymick signed a one-year contract with Alvark Tokyo, returning to Japan for a second stint.

In April 2017, Naymick moved to Australia and signed with the Stirling Senators of the State Basketball League for the 2017 season. In 21 games for the Senators, he averaged 7.6 points, 8.0 rebounds and 1.6 assists per game.

In September 2017, Naymick signed Link Tochigi Brex, returning to the team for a second stint. He left Tochigi Brex in December 2017, and joined Otsuka Corporation Alphas in January 2018.
