= Musashi-Takahagi Station =

Railway station in Hidaka, Saitama Prefecture, Japan

Musashi-Takahagi Station 武蔵高萩駅
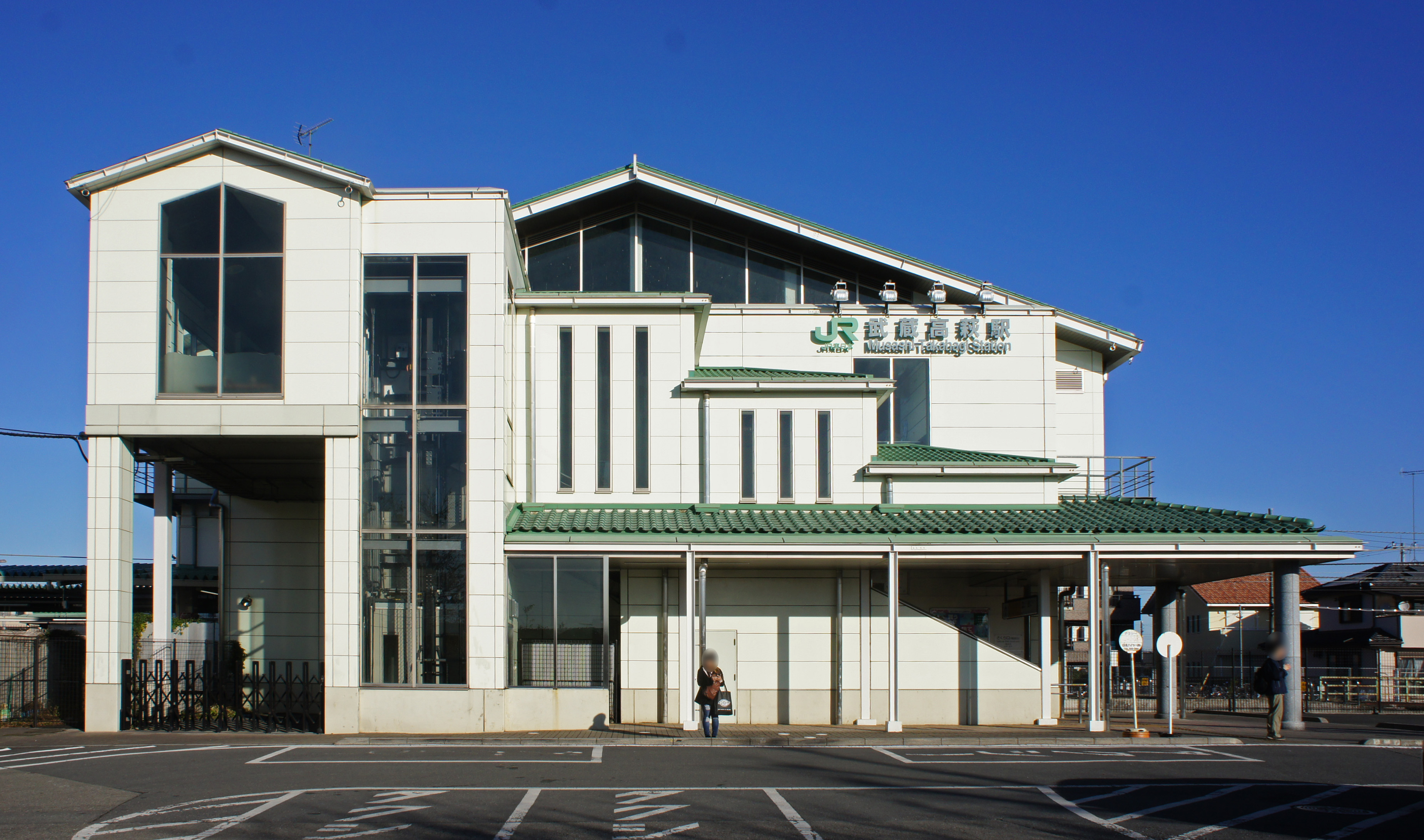
- Station south ("Sakura") entrance in November 2019

General information
- Location: 629 Takahagi, Hidaka-shi, Saitama-ken 350-1213; Japan
- Coordinates: 35°54′6.3504″N 139°22′17.22″E
- Operator: JR East
- Line: ■ Kawagoe Line
- Distance: 10.9 km from Kawagoe
- Platforms: 1 island platform
- Connections: Bus stop

Other information
- Status: Staffed
- Website: Official website

History
- Opened: 22 July 1940

Passengers
- FY2019: 3442 (daily, boarding only)

Services
| Preceding station | JR East | Following station |
|---|---|---|
| Komagawa Terminus | Kawagoe Line | Kasahata towards Kawagoe |
Location
- Location within Saitama Prefecture Location within Japan

Musashi-Takahagi Station (武蔵高萩駅, Musashi-Takahagi-eki) is a passenger railway station located in the city of Hidaka, Saitama, Japan, operated by the East Japan Railway Company (JR East).

== Lines ==
Musashi-Takahagi Station is served by the Kawagoe Line between Kawagoe and Komagawa, and is located 10.9 km from Kawagoe. Services operate every 20 minutes during the daytime, with some services continuing to and from Hachiōji on the Hachikō Line.

== Station layout ==
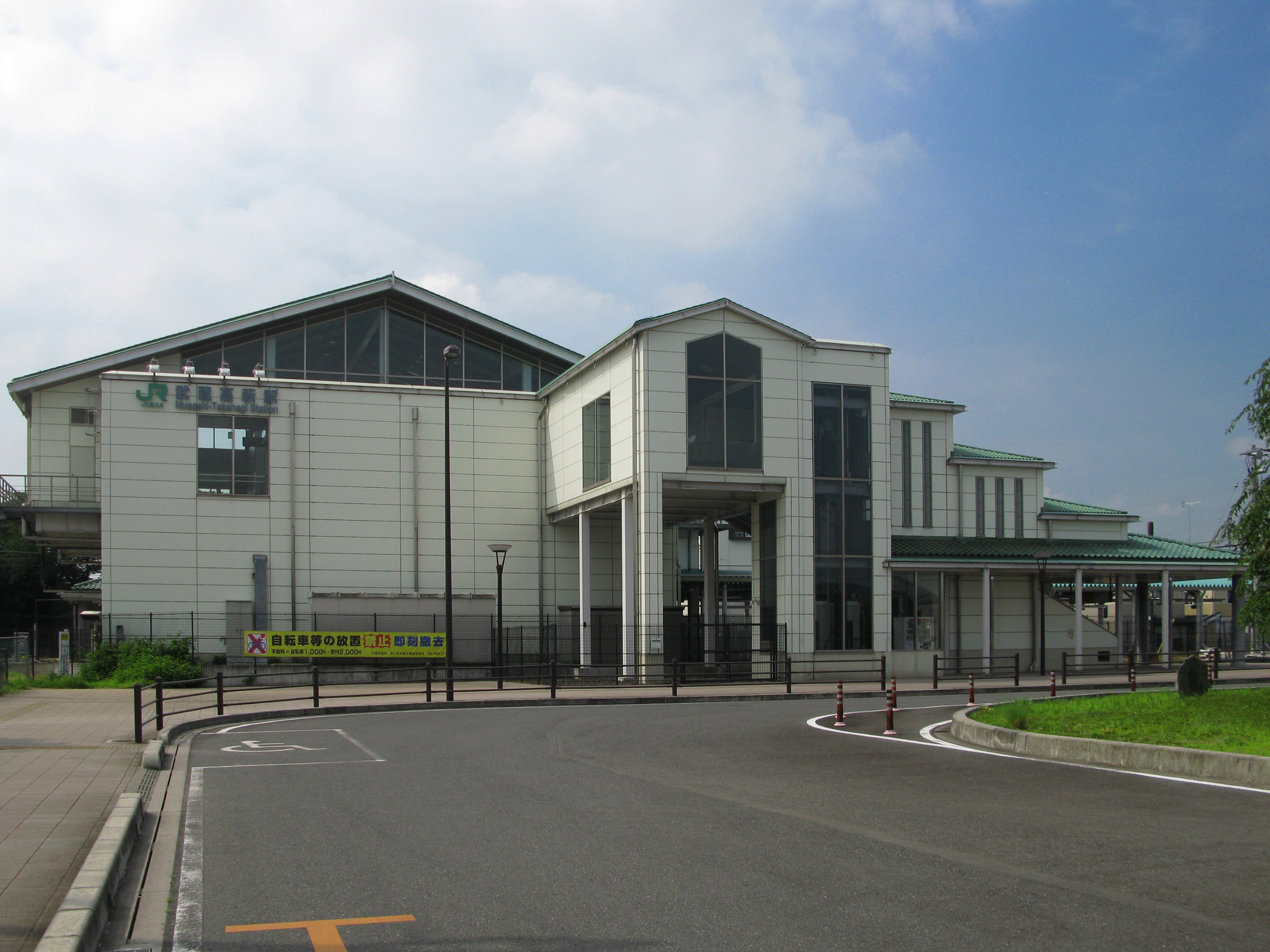
North ("Asahi") entrance, August 2012

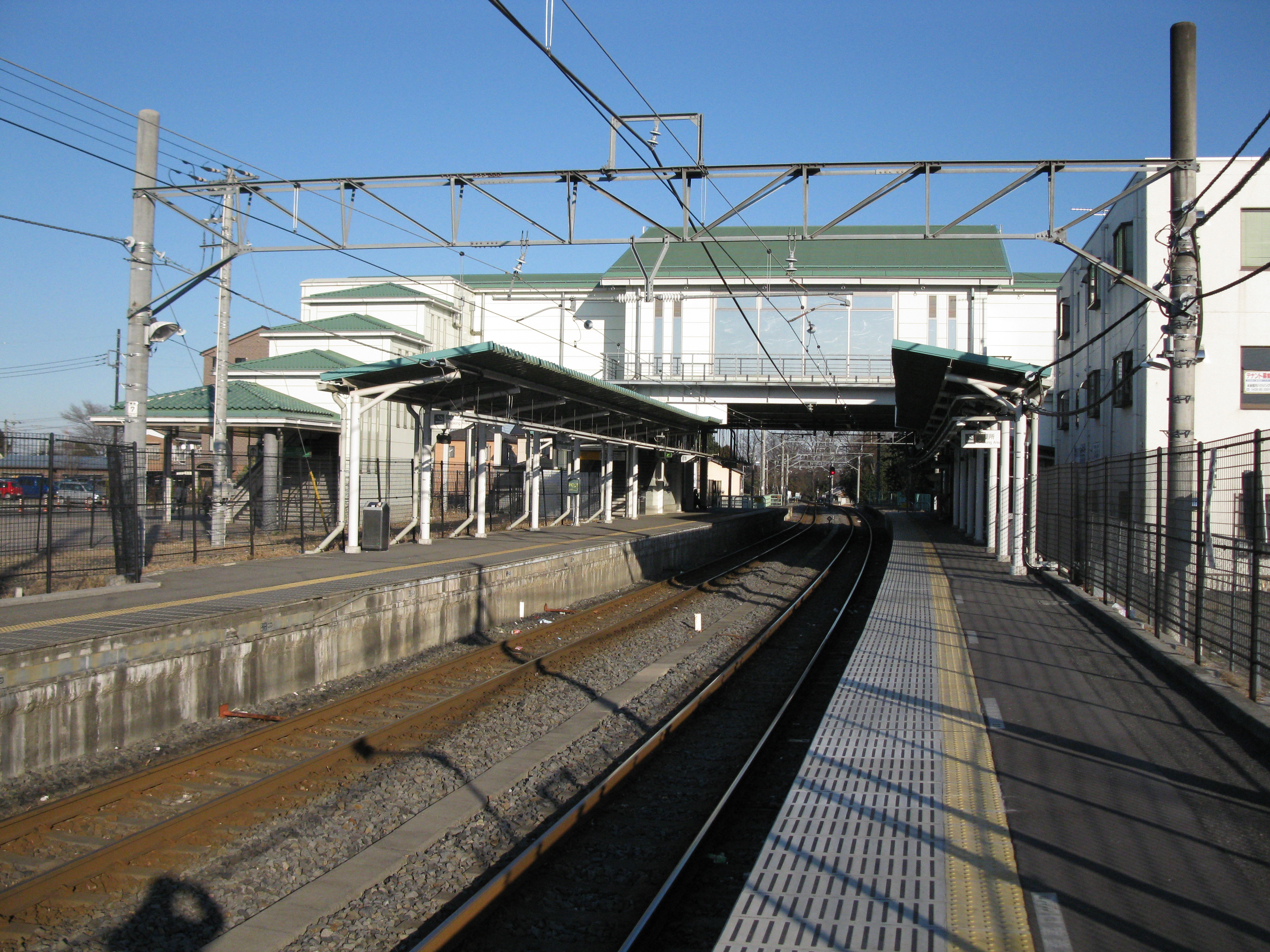
View of the platforms from the west end of the station, January 2009

The station has an elevated concourse connecting the north and south sides of the station. The tracks are at ground level, with a single island platform serving two tracks. Many trains cross here on the otherwise single-track line. The station is staffed.

=== Platforms ===
| 1 | ■ Kawagoe Line | for Komagawa, Haijima, and Hachiōji |
| 2 | ■ Kawagoe Line | for Kawagoe |

=== Facilities and accessibility ===
The station has escalator access to the platforms from the overhead concourse, and has universal access toilets.

== History ==
The station opened on 22 July 1940 in what was then the village of Takahagi. On 1 June 1985, the village of Takahagi was merged to become part of the town of Hidaka. This was upgraded to become a city on 1 October 1991. With the privatization of JNR on 1 April 1987, the station came under the control of JR East.

A new elevated station building was opened on 19 February 2005.

== Passenger statistics ==
In fiscal 2019, the station was used by an average of 3442 passengers daily (boarding passengers only).

| Fiscal year | Daily average |
|---|---|
| 2000 | 3,095 |
| 2005 | 2,889 |
| 2010 | 3,183 |
| 2015 | 3,275 |

== Surrounding area ==
- National Route 407
- Saitama Women's Junior College
- Hidaka High School
- Takahagi Junior High School
- Takahagi Kita Junior High School
- Takahagi Elementary School
- Takahagi Kita Elementary School

== See also ==
- List of railway stations in Japan
