= Takumi Hasegawa =

Takumi Hasegawa may refer to:

- Takumi Hasegawa (basketball) (長谷川 技, born 1989), Japanese basketball player
- Takumi Hasegawa (footballer) (長谷川 巧, born 1998), Japanese footballer
