= Shuji Ono =

Japanese basketball player and coach

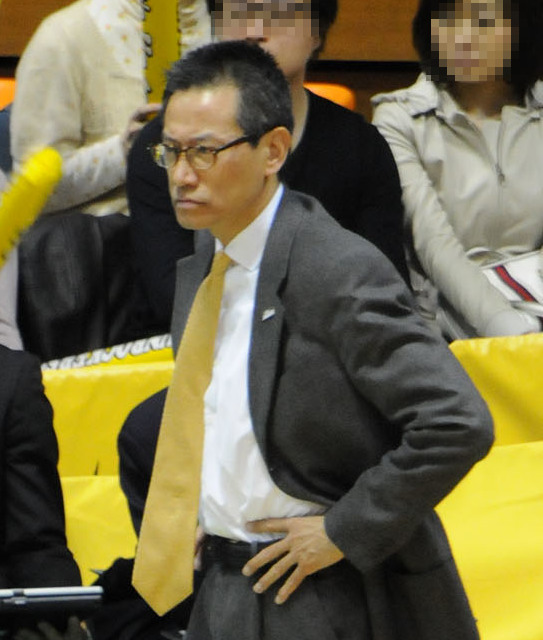

Osaka Evessa
- Position: Academy head coach

Personal information
- Born: January 31, 1958 (age 68) Noshiro, Akita

Career information
- High school: Noshiro Technical (Noshiro, Akita)
- College: Tsukuba University
- Coaching career: 1988–present

Career history

Playing
- 1980-1988: Sumitomo Metal Sparks

Coaching
- 1988-2000: Aichi Gakusen University
- 2000: Toyota Alvark (asst)
- 2000-2005: Toyota Alvark
- 2005-2013: Hitachi SunRockers
- 2014-2017: Earthfriends Tokyo Z
- 2017-2019: Noshiro Technical High School (associate)
- 2009: Japan national
- 2019-2021: Noshiro Technical High School
Medals
Representing Japan
Asian Games
Bronze medal – third place	1982 New Delhi	Japan
FIBA Asia Cup
Bronze medal – third place	1987 Bangkok	Japan

Shuji Ono (小野秀二, Ono Shuji; born January 31, 1958) is the former head coach for Toyota Alvark, Hitachi SunRockers and Earthfriends Tokyo Z in Japan.

== Head coaching record ==
Legend
Regular season	G	Games coached	W	Games won	L	Games lost	W–L %	Win–loss %
Playoffs	PG	Playoff games	PW	Playoff wins	PL	Playoff losses	PW–L %	Playoff win–loss %

Team	Year	G	W	L	W–L%	Finish	PG	PW	PL	PW–L%	Result
Aichi Gakusen University	1988-2001	300	258	42	.860			-	-	-	–
Toyota Alvark	1988-2001	138	82	56	.594			-	-	-	–
Hitachi SunRockers	2005-2013	190	103	87	.542			-	-	-	–
Earthfriends Tokyo Z	2014-2017	128	74	54	.578			-	-	-	–
