= Aichi Gakusen College =

Coordinates: 34°58′20″N 137°08′38″E

- 愛知学泉短期大学
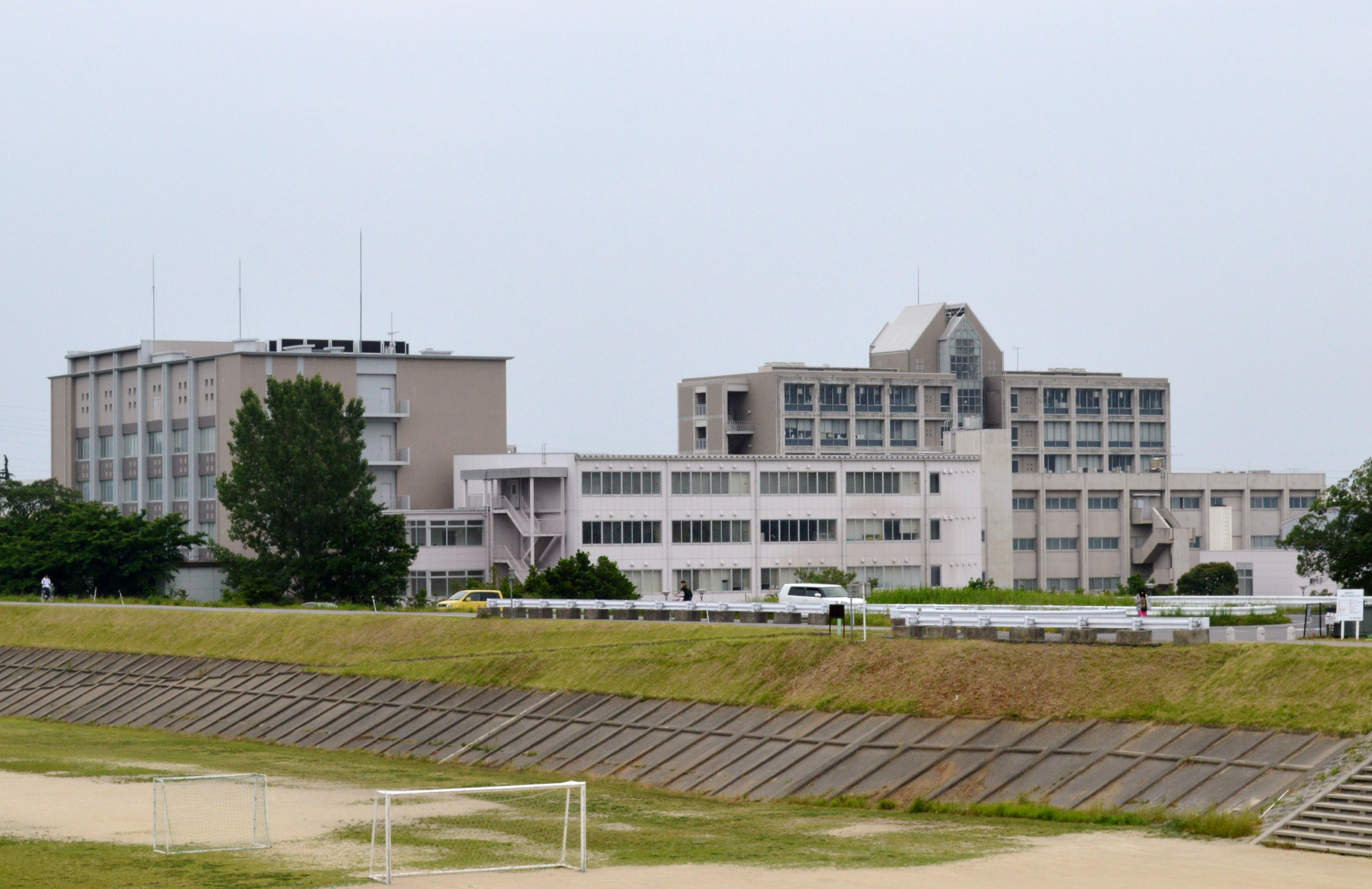
- Aichi Gakusen University Okazaki Campus
- Established: 1950
- Location: Okazaki, Aichi, Japan
- Website: www.gakusen.ac.jp/t/

Aichi Gakusen College (愛知学泉短期大学, Aichi Gakusen Tanki Daigaku) is a private junior college in Okazaki, Aichi, Japan.

== History and outline ==
The school was founded in 1912 as a school called Anjō Saihō Jogakkō (安城裁縫女学校). It was chartered as a junior college in 1950 and renamed Anjō Gakuen Joshi Tankidaigaku (安城学園女子短期大学部). In 1966, the college foundation, Anjō Gakuen Educational Corporation, established Aichi Gakusen University. In April 1982, the junior college was renamed Aichi Gakusen Joshi Tankidaigaku (愛知学泉女子短期大学). The junior college became coeducational in 2001.
