= Kasahata Station =

Railway station in Kawagoe, Saitama Prefecture, Japan

Kasahata Station 笠幡駅
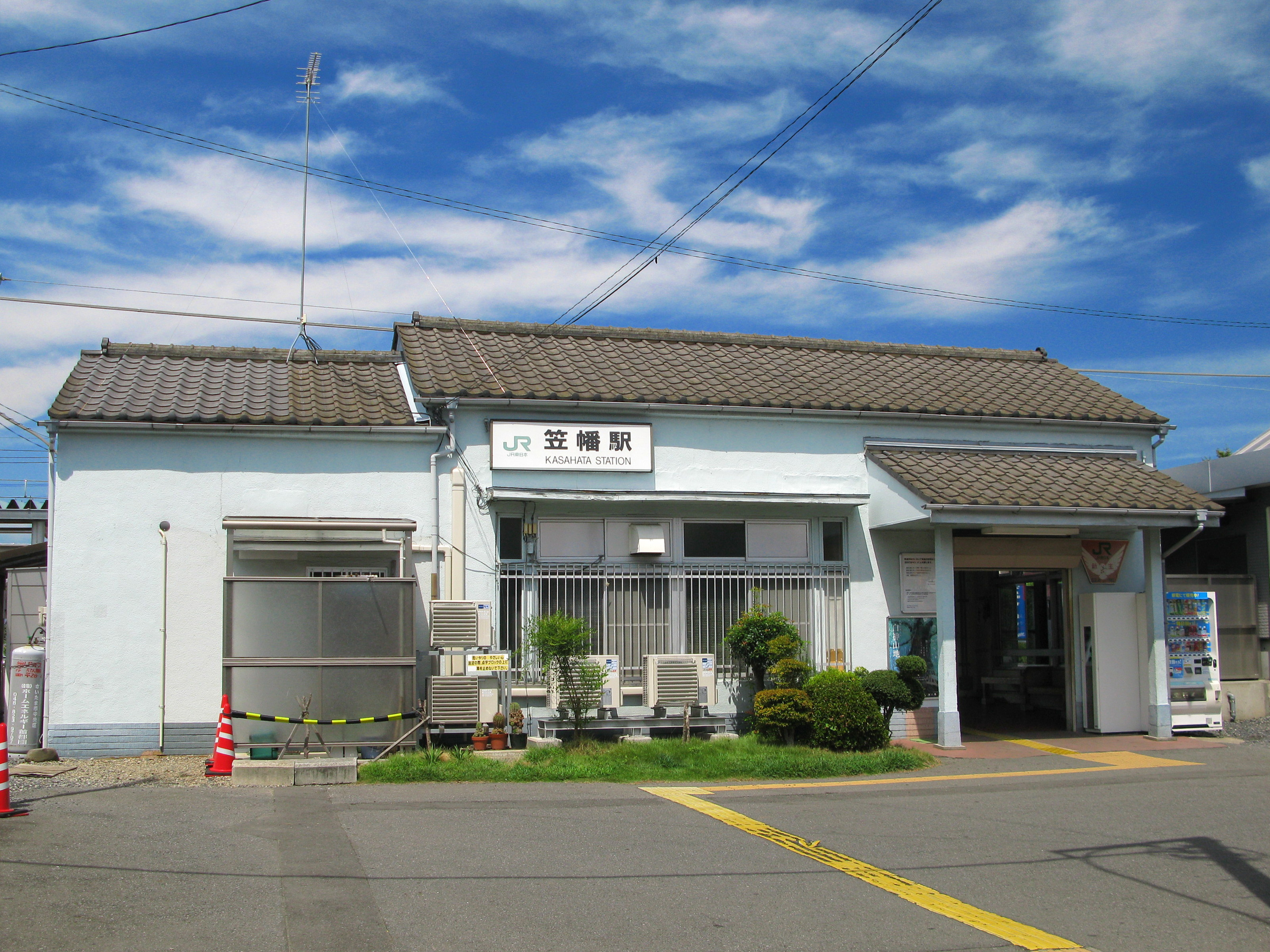
- Kasahata Station entrance, September 2012

General information
- Location: 3732 Kasahata, Kawagoe-shi, Saitama-ken 350-1175; Japan
- Coordinates: 35°54′27.2232″N 139°24′23.25″E
- Operator: JR East
- Line: ■ Kawagoe Line
- Distance: 7.7 km from Kawagoe
- Platforms: 1 side platform
- Connections: Bus stop

Other information
- Status: Staffed
- Website: Official website

History
- Opened: 22 July 1940

Passengers
- FY2019: 2993 (daily, boarding only)

Services
Preceding station	JR East	Following station
Musashi-Takahagi towards Komagawa	Kawagoe Line	Matoba towards Kawagoe
Location
- Location within Saitama Prefecture Location within Japan

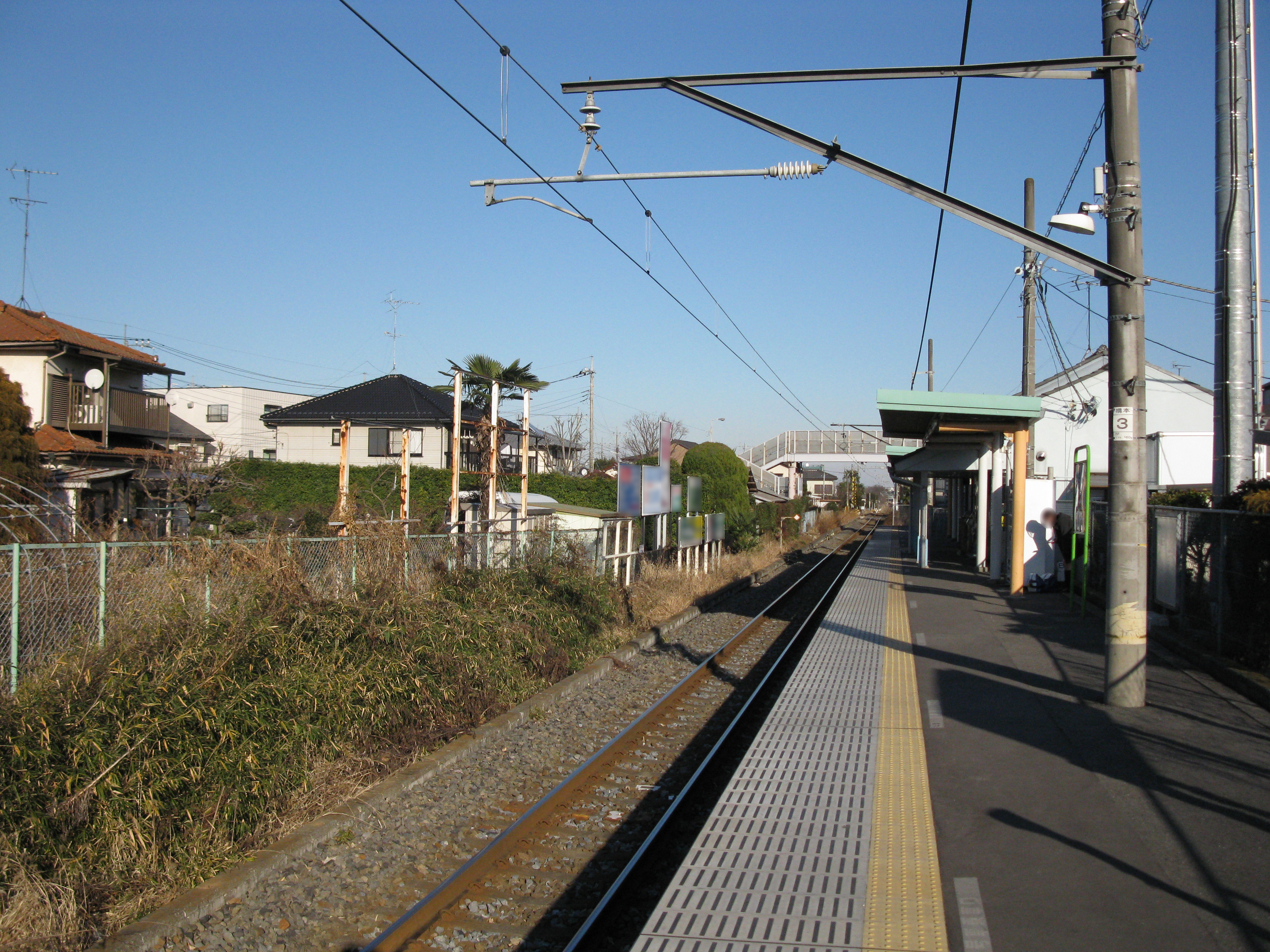
View of the platform looking east, January 2009

Kasahata Station (笠幡駅, Kasahata-eki) is a passenger railway station on the Kawagoe Line located in the city of Kawagoe, Saitama, Japan, operated by East Japan Railway Company (JR East).

== Lines ==
Kasahata Station is served by the Kawagoe Line between Kawagoe and Komagawa, and is located 7.7 km from Kawagoe. Services operate every 20 minutes during the daytime, with some services continuing to and from Hachiōji on the Hachikō Line.

== Station layout ==
The station has one side platform serving a single bidirectional track. The station building is adjacent to the south side of the track. The station is staffed.

=== Platforms ===
1	■ Kawagoe Line	for Kawagoe, Komagawa, and Hachiōji

== History ==
The station opened on 22 July 1940. With the privatization of JNR on 1 April 1987, the station came under the control of JR East.

== Passenger statistics ==
In fiscal 2019, the station was used by an average of 2933 passengers daily (boarding passengers only).

The passenger figures for previous years are as shown below.

Fiscal year	Daily average
2000	3,072
2005	2,893
2010	2,916
2015	3,010

== Surrounding area ==
- Chikōzan Park
- Kasumigaseki Country Club, a planned venue for the 2020 Summer Olympics
- Bunri University of Hospitality
- Kawagoe Nishi High School
- Shūmei High School
- Kasumigaseki Nishi Junior High School

== See also ==
- List of railway stations in Japan
