= Yasutaka Okayama =

Japanese basketball coach and former player

Personal information
- Born: November 29, 1954 (age 71) Mashiki, Kumamoto
- Listed height: 7 ft 8 in (2.34 m)
- Listed weight: 330 lb (150 kg)

Career information
- High school: Kyushu Gakuin (Kumamoto, Kumamoto)
- College: Osaka University of Commerce
- NBA draft: 1981: 8th round, 171st overall pick
- Drafted by: Golden State Warriors
- Playing career: 1979–1990
- Position: Center
- Coaching career: 1993–present

Career history

Playing
- 1979–1990: Sumitomo Metal Sparks

Coaching
- 1993–1995: Sumitomo Metal Sparks (assistant)
- 1996–1999: Osaka University of Commerce (assistant)

Career highlights
- As player: 2× JBL Scoring Leader (1981, 1982); 5× JBL Best Five (1979–1983); 3× JBL Rebound Leader (1979, 1981, 1982)
- Stats at Basketball Reference
Medals
Representing Japan
Asian Games
| Bronze medal – third place | 1982 New Delhi | Japan |
William Jones Cup
| Bronze medal – third place | 1986 Taipei | Team |

Yasutaka Okayama (岡山恭崇, Okayama Yasutaka; born November 29, 1954) is a Japanese former professional basketball player and coach. He was selected by the Golden State Warriors as the 171st pick of the eighth round of the 1981 NBA draft, although he did not sign with them. At 7 ft 8 in (2.34 m), he is the tallest player to be drafted in National Basketball Association (NBA) history. Okayama was the only player from Japan drafted into the NBA until Rui Hachimura was selected in the 2019 NBA draft.

Okayama practiced judo at junior high and high school, and obtained a second degree black belt. He started playing basketball at Osaka University of Commerce when he was eighteen. In 1975, when his height was about 2.08 metres (6 ft 10 in), he was recruited by the University of Portland; he spent two years there, but a medical check revealed gigantism and he never played for the varsity team. After graduation, he joined the Sumitomo Metal Sparks basketball club. He represented Japan between 1979 and 1986 before retiring in 1996.

After being selected in the 1981 NBA draft, Okayama opted to stay in Japan.

As of 2005, he worked for Sumitomo Metal Industries and was active as a basketball coach.

Okayama wrote a book for young basketball players in 1989.

== See also ==
- Rui Hachimura
- Wataru Misaka
- Yuta Tabuse
- Yuta Watanabe
