= Mitsuhiko =

- Gender: Male

Origin
- Origin: Japanese
- Meaning: Different meanings depending on the kanji used

Mitsuhiko (written: 光彦 or 三彦) is a masculine Japanese given name. Notable people with the name include:

- Mitsuhiko Imamori (今森 光彦; born 1954), Japanese photographer
- Mitsuhiko Kato (加藤 三彦; born 1962), Japanese basketball coach
- Mitsuhiko Masuda (増田 光彦; born 1937), Japanese golfer
- Akiseyama Mitsuhiko (明瀬山 光彦; born 1985), Japanese sumo wrestler

== Fictional characters ==
- Mitsuhiko Ishibori, a character from Ultraman Nexus whose the real identity was Dark Zagi
