= Hidaka, Saitama =

Hidaka 日高市
- City
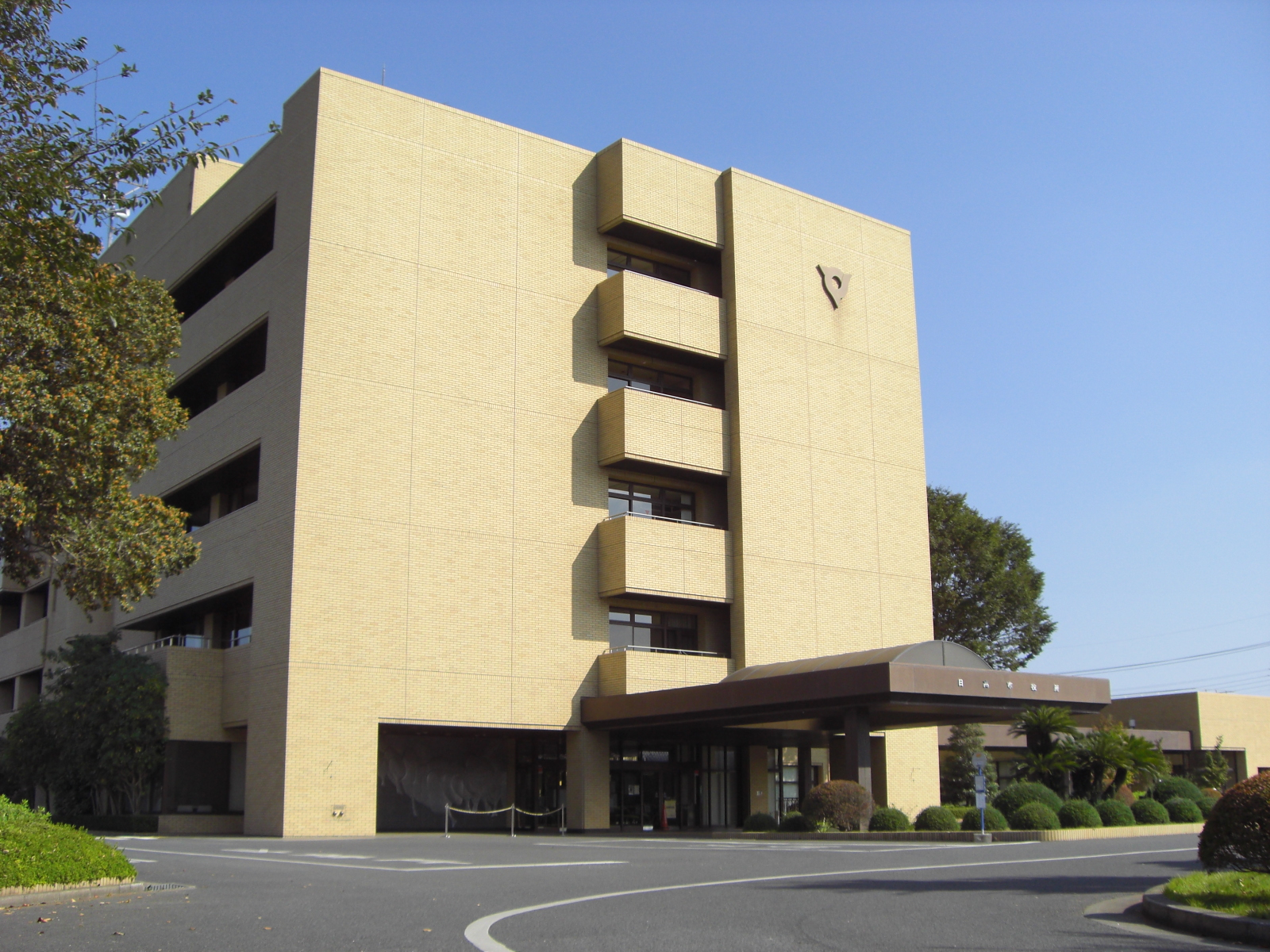
- Hidaka city hall

- Flag Emblem

- Location of Hidaka in Saitama Prefecture

- Coordinates: 35°54′28.1″N 139°20′20.7″E
- Country: Japan
- Region: Kantō
- Prefecture: Saitama

Government
  - Mayor: Teruo Yagasaki (since April 2012)

Area
  - Total: 47.48 km^{2} (18.33 sq mi)

Population (January 2021)
  - Total: 55,294
  - Density: 1,165/km^{2} (3,016/sq mi)
- Time zone: UTC+9 (Japan Standard Time)
- Tree: Osmanthus
- Flower: Lespedeza
- Bird: Common kingfisher
- Phone number: 042-989-2111
- Address: 1020 Minami-Hirasawa, Hidaka-shi, Saitama-ken 350-1292
- Website: Official website

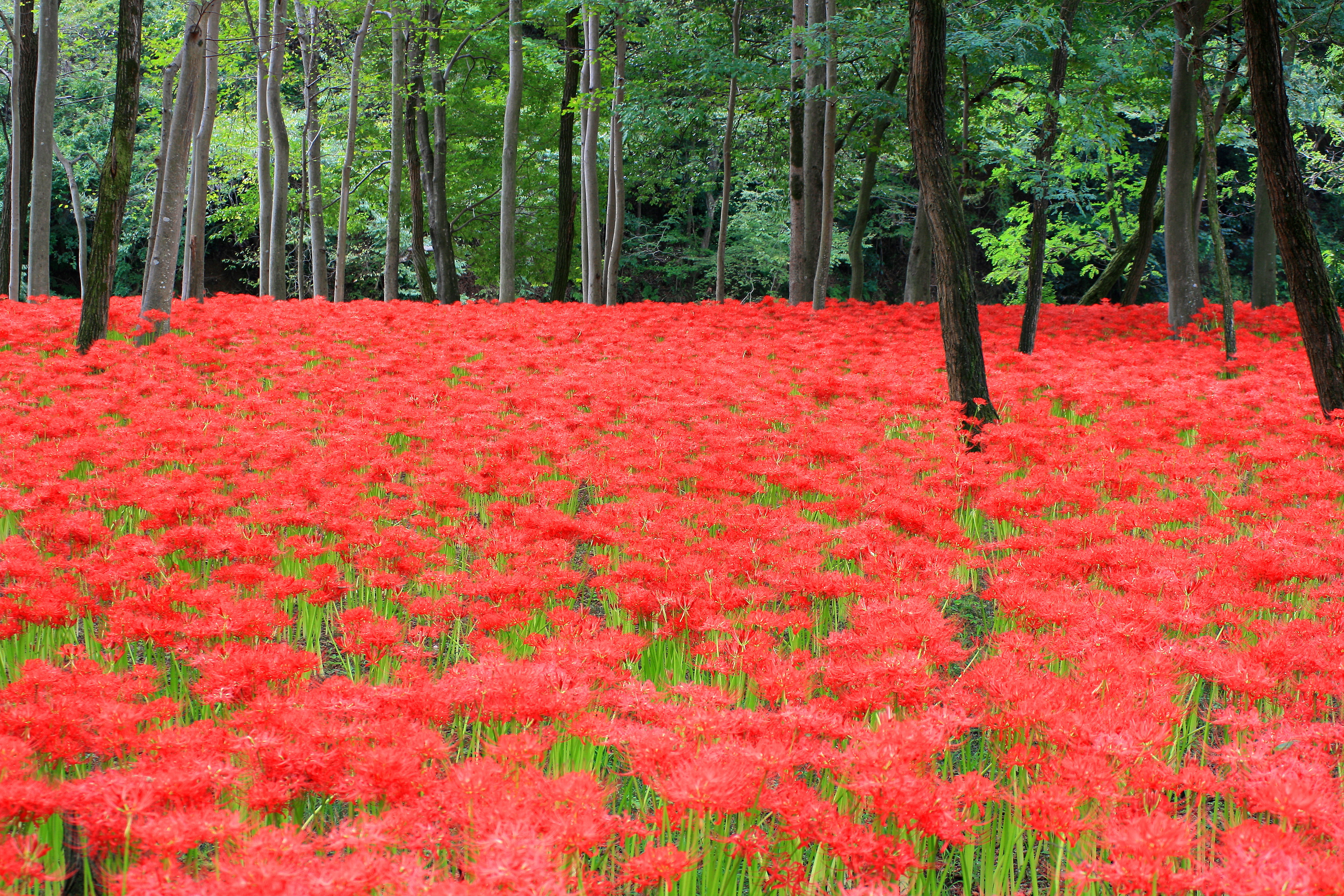
Kinchakuda Spider Lily

Hidaka (日高市, Hidaka-shi; Japanese pronunciation: [çí.dä̀.kä̀, çì.dä́.kä́.ɕì]) is a city located in Saitama Prefecture, Japan. As of 1 January 2021, the city had an estimated population of 55,294 in 24,328 households and a population density of 1200 persons per km^{2}. The total area of the city is 47.48 square kilometres (18.33 sq mi).

== Geography ==
Hidaka is located in south-central Saitama Prefecture.

=== Surrounding municipalities ===
Saitama Prefecture

- Hannō
- Kawagoe
- Moroyama
- Sakado
- Sayama
- Tsurugashima

=== Climate ===
Hidaka has a humid subtropical climate (Köppen Cfa) characterized by warm summers and cool winters with light to no snowfall. The average annual temperature in Hidaka is 14.3 °C (57.7 °F). The average annual rainfall is 1,427 mm (56.2 in) with September as the wettest month. The temperatures are highest on average in August, at around 26.2 °C (79.2 °F), and lowest in January, at around 3.4 °C (38.1 °F).

== Demographics ==
Per Japanese census data, the population of Hidaka has remained relatively stable over the past 30 years.

Historical population
Year	Pop.	±%
1920	19,912	—
1930	20,578	+3.3%
1940	12,587	−38.8%
1950	16,108	+28.0%
1960	16,683	+3.6%
1970	21,646	+29.7%
1980	43,219	+99.7%
1990	53,169	+23.0%
2000	53,758	+1.1%
2010	57,473	+6.9%
2020	54,571	−5.0%

== History ==
The area of modern-day Hidaka was part of ancient Koma District, Musashi Province, mentioned in records dating from 716 AD as a place of resettlement for refugees from the Tang invasion of the Kingdom of Goguryeo on the Korean Peninsula in 668 AD. During the Edo period, the area developed as Takahagi-shuku, a post station on the Nikkō Wakiōkan highway linking Edo with Nikkō. The three villages of Komagawa, Koma and Takahagi were established within Koma District with the establishment of the modern municipalities system on April 1, 1889. In 1896 Koma District was abolished, becoming part of Iruma District. On February 11, 1955, Komagawa and Koma merged to create the town of Hidaka. Takahagi joined Hidaka on September 20, 1956. Hidaka was elevated to city status on October 1, 1991.

== Government ==
Hidaka has a mayor-council form of government with a directly elected mayor and a unicameral city council of 16 members. Hidaka contributes one member to the Saitama Prefectural Assembly. In terms of national politics, the city is part of Saitama 9th district of the lower house of the Diet of Japan.

== Economy ==
The economy of Hidaka remains primarily agricultural, with some light manufacturing. A number of housing districts have been built near the train stations, as the city is increasing a bedroom community for Tokyo metropolis to the south.

== Education ==
- Saitama Women's Junior College
- Hidaka has six public elementary schools and six public middle schools operated by the city government, and one public high school operated by the Saitama Prefectural Board of Education. The prefecture also operates one special education school for the handicapped.

== Transportation ==
=== Railway ===
JR East – Hachikō Line

- Komagawa

JR East – Kawagoe Line

- Komagawa - Musashi-Takahagi

Seibu Railway - Seibu Ikebukuro Line

- Koma - Musashi-Yokote

=== Highway ===
- National Route 299
- National Route 407

== Sister cities ==
- Osan, Gyeonggi-do, South Korea, since 1996

== Local attractions ==
- Kinchakuda Plateau
- Koma Shrine
