= Paul Afeaki Khoury =

Tongan-Lebanese basketball player (born 1968)

Personal information
- Born: April 27, 1968 (age 58) Tonga
- Listed height: 6 ft 10 in (2.08 m)
- Listed weight: 283 lb (128 kg)

Career information
- College: Utah (1988–1992)
- Playing career: 1994–2006
- Position: Center

Paul Afeaki Khoury (Arabic: بول أفايكي خوري; born 27 April 1968) is a Tongan-Lebanese former professional basketball player of American descent. He played most of his career in Japan and Lebanon.

He was born in Tonga to American parents, and graduated from the University of Utah in 1992. He joined the Utah Jazz summer league camp in 1992.

He selected with the 9th overall selection in the 1992 CBA Draft.

== Career ==
He played his first pro season in Turkey before heading to Japan (played for Saitama Broncos, Sumitomo Metal Sparks, Hamamatsu Higashimikawa Phoenix) for 5 years. In 2001, he signed a contract with the Lebanese team Al Ryadi and three years later he joined Sagesse. He was granted by a Lebanese passport by the government.

- 1994–95 (Turkey) Fenerbahçe
- 1995 (Turkey) Antalya Büyükşehir Belediyesi
- 1996–01 in Japan
  - (Japan) Saitama Broncos
  - (Japan) Sumitomo Metal Sparks
  - (Japan) Hamamatsu Higashimikawa Phoenix
- 2001–04 (Lebanon) Al Ryadi
- 2004–06 (Lebanon) Sagesse

== Lebanon National Team ==
With the Lebanon National Team, he played the 2002 FIBA World Championship in Indianapolis. The team didn't manage to win a single game and got the last rank after a 70–100 loss to Algeria in the classification game despite a 16 pts 9 rbs effort from him. During the tournament, he averaged 6.4 pts 56.5 %FG 6.0 rbs in 19 min per game including a 7 pts 10 rbs game against Turkey.

Lebanon secured the silver medal in the Asian Championship with a loss in the final game against Yao Ming's China and Paul was one of the best post player in the tournament.
