= Yuta Tabuse =

Japanese basketball player (born 1980)

Yuta Tabuse 田臥 勇太
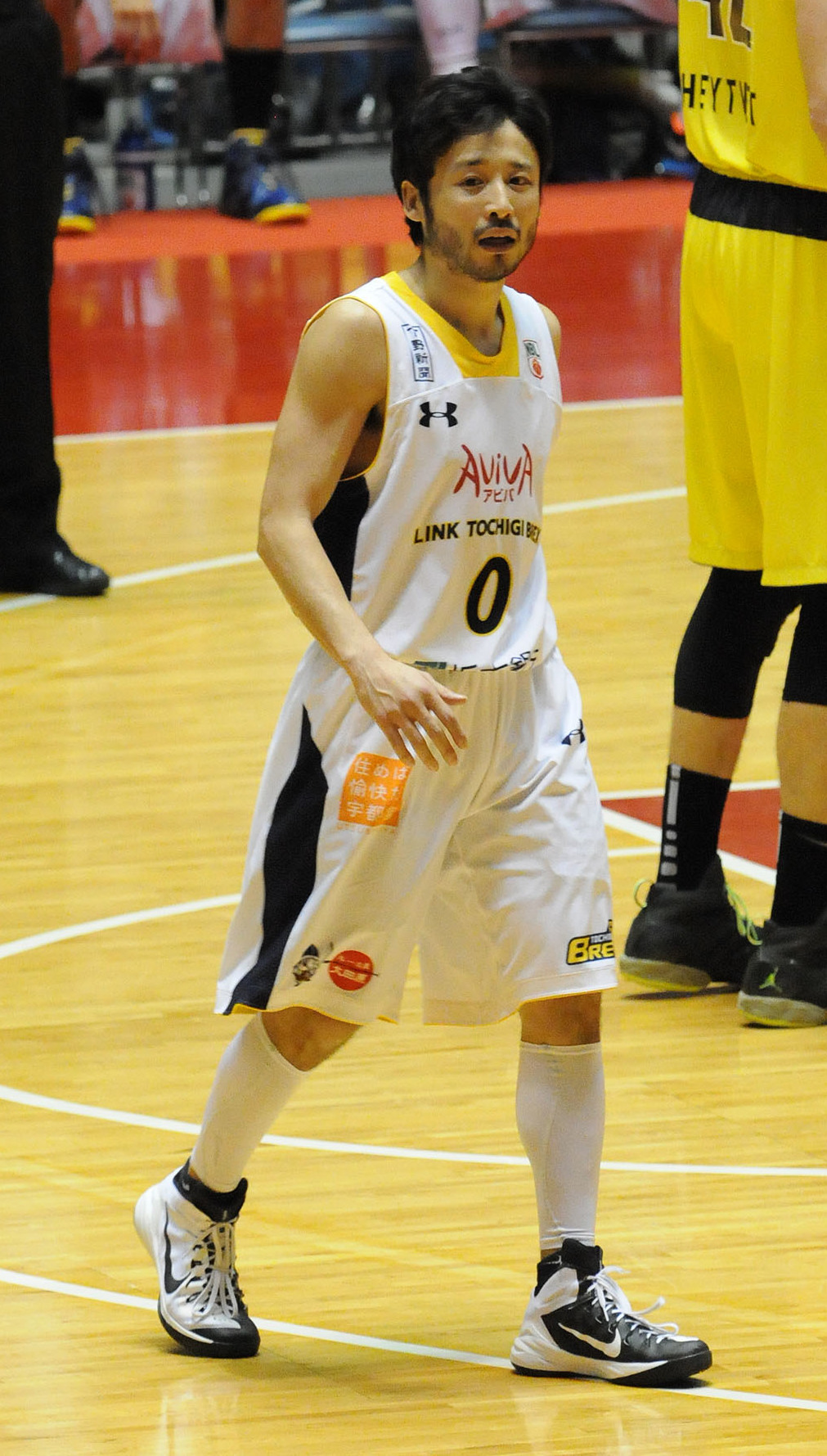
- Tabuse in 2015

No. 0 – Utsunomiya Brex
- Position: Point guard
- League: B.League

Personal information
- Born: October 5, 1980 (age 46) Kanazawa-ku, Yokohama, Kanagawa, Japan
- Listed height: 5 ft 9 in (1.75 m)
- Listed weight: 165 lb (75 kg)

Career information
- High school: Noshiro Technical (Noshiro, Akita)
- College: BYU–Hawaii (2001–2002)
- NBA draft: 2002: undrafted
- Playing career: 2002–present

Career history
- 2002–2003: Toyota Alvark
- 2003–2004: Long Beach Jam
- 2004: Phoenix Suns
- 2005–2006: Albuquerque Thunderbirds
- 2006–2007: Bakersfield Jam
- 2007–2008: Anaheim Arsenal
- 2008–present: Link Tochigi / Utsunomiya Brex

Career highlights
- EASL champion (2026); 3× B.League Champion (2017, 2022, 2025); JBL Finals MVP (2010); JBL Champion (2010); ABA Champion (2004)
- Stats at NBA.com
- Stats at Basketball Reference

Yuta Tabuse (田臥 勇太, Tabuse Yūta; born October 5, 1980) is a Japanese professional basketball player for Utsunomiya Brex of the B.League. A point guard, Tabuse is 1.75 metres (5 ft 9 in) and 75 kilograms (165 lb). He was the first Japanese-born player to appear in a National Basketball Association (NBA) game.

Tabuse has enjoyed popularity in Japan since his high school playing days, when he led his school to three straight national championships, and has been referred to as "the Michael Jordan of Japan" for his celebrity status.

== Career ==
=== Early years ===
Tabuse, who was born in Yokohama and grew up in what he calls "a sports family", began playing basketball at the age of nine, because he was not good at baseball and not interested in soccer. He attended Noshiro Technical High School in Akita Prefecture, where he led his team to national championships all three years he was there and lost only a single game.

After graduation from high school in March 1999, Tabuse chose to enroll at Brigham Young University-Hawaii for its English as an International Language program. He sat out his first two seasons at BYUH because of eligibility rules and played one season before turning pro. He averaged 7.6 points per game and led the Pacific West Conference with 6.6 assists.

Tabuse returned to join the Toyota Alvark, with whom he won the Japan Basketball League Rookie of the Year award for the 2002–03 season.

=== NBA, ABA and NBA D-League ===
After leaving the Toyota Alvark in 2003, Tabuse became the first Japanese national to play in the NBA's summer league, playing six games in the Rocky Mountain Revue for the Dallas Mavericks, averaging 4.5 points, 1.7 rebounds and 1.0 assists in 13 minutes per game. Tabuse's first attempt at making it to the NBA made the headlines in Japan, and drew large media attention. On September 27 of that year, Tabuse joined the Denver Nuggets' training camp, but he was waived on October 24, before the start of the regular season.

Tabuse spent the 2003–04 season with the American Basketball Association champion Long Beach Jam, averaging 5.3 points, 2.4 rebounds, and a team-high 6.3 assists per game in 18 games.

In 2004, Tabuse joined the Phoenix Suns' training camp and made the opening night roster. He scored seven points in his first NBA game against the Atlanta Hawks on November 3, 2004, becoming on that day the first Japanese player ever to play in an NBA regular season game. However, he was waived by the Suns on December 16, 2004, after playing in four games and rejoined the Jam for the remainder of the ABA season. Suns assistant coach Marc Iavaroni said of Tabuse: "I liked his energy, I liked his courage."

Those four games with Phoenix ended up being Tabuse's only playing time in the NBA throughout his professional basketball career. His fourth and final game in the NBA was played on December 15, 2004, in a 108–86 win over the Utah Jazz. Tabuse only played for two minutes and recorded no stats.

In 2005, Tabuse signed with the Los Angeles Clippers, but was waived before the start of the regular season. That fall, Tabuse appeared on a limited edition cover of NBA Live video game in Japan, even though he did not play a single NBA regular season game. That year, he was drafted by the Albuquerque Thunderbirds of the NBA Development League (D-League) and averaged 6.5 points and 4.0 assists in 34 games before he was waived on March 16, 2006. Michael Cooper, former NBA player and Tabuse's coach with the Albuquerque Thunderbirds, said of him, "He automatically changes the game because of his quickness and distributing the ball. He's the best fundamental player I've seen around in a long time."

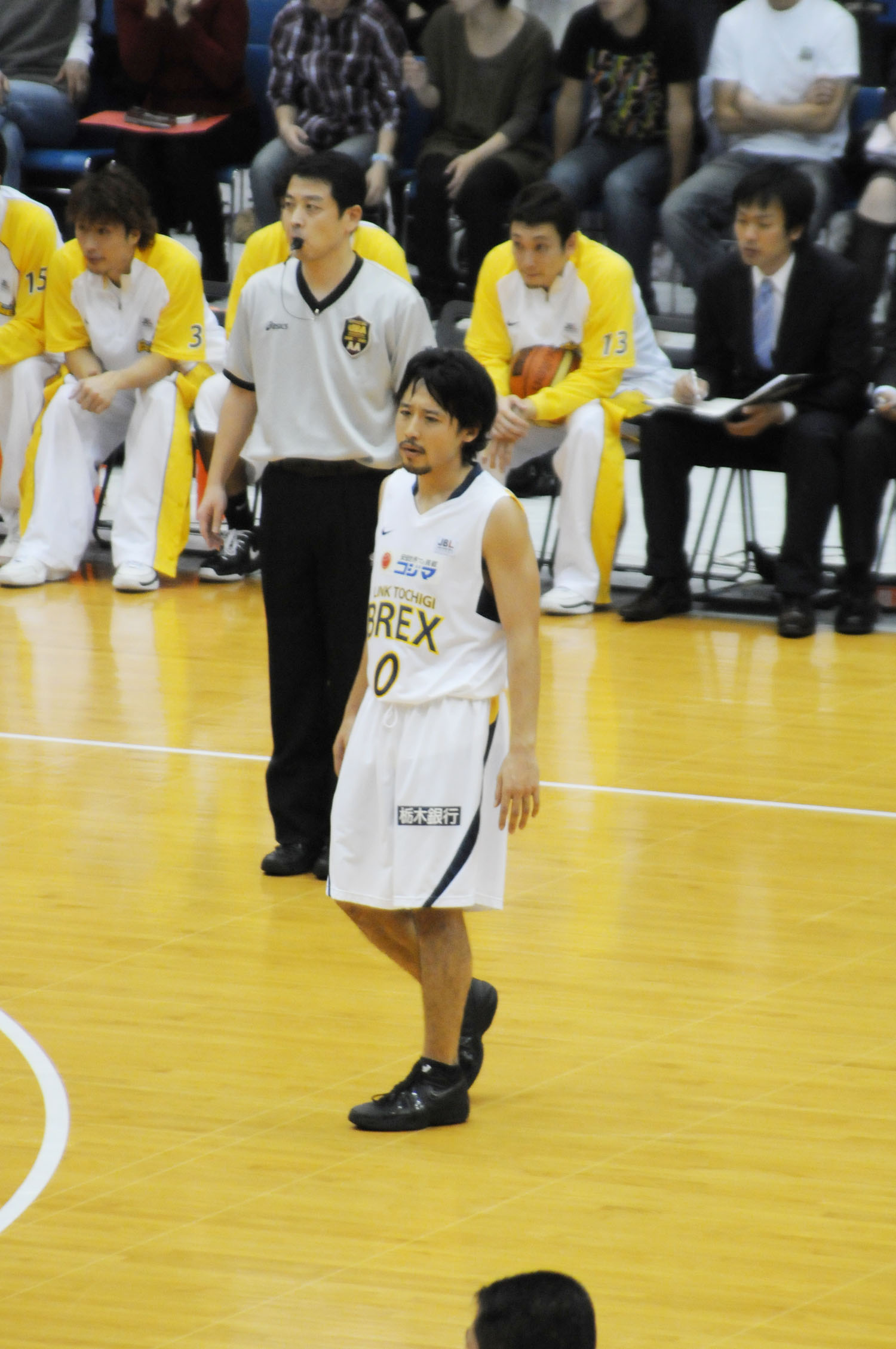
Yuta Tabuse at Link Tochigi Brex

In 2006, Tabuse decided to forsake an opportunity to play with the Japanese national team in the world championships that took place between August 19 to September 3 across five cities in Japan, and instead play with the Dallas Mavericks' summer league team. In November 2006, Tabuse was drafted into the NBA D-League with the 11th pick of the third round (35th overall) by the Bakersfield Jam. In November 2007, Tabuse was cut by the Bakersfield Jam before the 2007–08 season.

On December 8, 2007, Tabuse was acquired by the Anaheim Arsenal of the D-League, and he made his debut on December 9 against the Bakersfield Jam, scoring four points and adding three assists in almost 13 minutes of play. For the 2007–08 season, Tabuse averaged 4.5 points, 1.2 rebounds and 2.0 assists in 39 games.

In July 2008, Tabuse joined the New Jersey Nets' squad in the Orlando Pro Summer League.

=== Return to Japan ===
In August 2008, Tabuse signed for Japan Basketball League side Link Tochigi Brex. Tochigi's head coach Mitsuhiko Kato was in charge of the basketball club of Noshiro Technical High School when Tabuse played for the school.

In April 2009, Tabuse was named to the 22-man roster for the Japan national basketball team. The team played at the FIBA Asia Championship for Men. In May 2009, ESPN reported that Tabuse would leave the national team after receiving an invitation by the Dallas Mavericks to compete in their summer camp.

In 2010, his team won the JBL Basketball League championship game. Tabuse was named Finals MVP. Tabuse's team would later win their second Japanese League championship in 2017 under the rebranded Japanese Professional Basketball League. Tabuse continues to play basketball professionally into his forties.

== Career statistics ==
Legend
GP	Games played	GS	Games started	MPG	Minutes per game
FG%	Field goal percentage	3P%	3-point field goal percentage	FT%	Free throw percentage
RPG	Rebounds per game	APG	Assists per game	SPG	Steals per game
BPG	Blocks per game	PPG	Points per game	**Bold**	Career high

=== Regular season ===
Year	Team	GP	GS	MPG	FG%	3P%	FT%	RPG	APG	SPG	BPG	PPG
2004–05	Phoenix	4	0	4.3	.167	1.000	1.000	1.0	0.8	0.0	0.0	1.8

=== D-League ===
Year	Team	GP	GS	MPG	FG%	3P%	FT%	RPG	APG	SPG	BPG	TO	PPG
2005–2006	ABQ	34	4	23.2	.406	.313	.780	2.1	4.0	1.2	0.0	1.21	6.5
2006–2007	BAK	44	3	18.7	.412	.263	.773	1.4	3.5	0.9	0.0	1.20	6.1
2007–2008	ANA	39	0	13.0	.374	.341	.810	1.2	2.0	0.9	0.0	1.07	5.7

=== JBL ===
Year	Team	GP	GS	MPG	FG%	3P%	FT%	RPG	APG	SPG	BPG	TO	PPG
2008–2009	Tochigi	33	33	34.2	.475	.226	.742	3.5	5.6	2.3	0.1	2.24	11.0
2009–2010	Tochigi	26	--	26.6	.551	.360	.803	3.1	3.5	2.0	0.0	1.46	11.8
2010–2011	Tochigi	31	--	28.8	.455	.375	.792	2.6	3.4	1.3	0.1	0.97	8.7
2011–2012	Tochigi	39		20.9	.488	.156	.741	2.3	2.6	1.2	0.1	1.5	6.4
2012–2013	Tochigi	22		26.8	.476	.188	.879	2.4	2.7	0.8	0.0	1.5	10.4

=== NBL ===
Year	Team	GP	GS	MPG	FG%	3P%	FT%	RPG	APG	SPG	BPG	TO	PPG
2013–2014	Tochigi	54		32.8	.441	.330	.858	4.2	5.9	2.0	0.1	2.1	15.6
2014–15	Tochigi	51		26.9	.471	.250	.814	2.2	4.5	1.7	0.1	1.7	10.3
2015–16	Tochigi	50		23.7	.484	.310	.826	2.0	3.3	1.2	0.0	1.0	7.0

=== B.League ===
==== Regular season ====
Year	Team	GP	GS	MPG	FG%	3P%	FT%	RPG	APG	SPG	BPG	TO	PPG
B1 2016–17	Tochigi	59	59	20.8	49.7	27.8	83.9	1.8	3.4	1.0	0.1	0.9	7.4
B1 2017–18	Tochigi	60	60	17.9	47.7	13.6	86.2	1.7	2.7	0.8	0.0	0.8	5.4

== See also ==
- Basketball in Japan
- Basketball in the United States
- List of shortest players in National Basketball Association history
