= Kasumigaseki Country Club =

Golf course in Japan

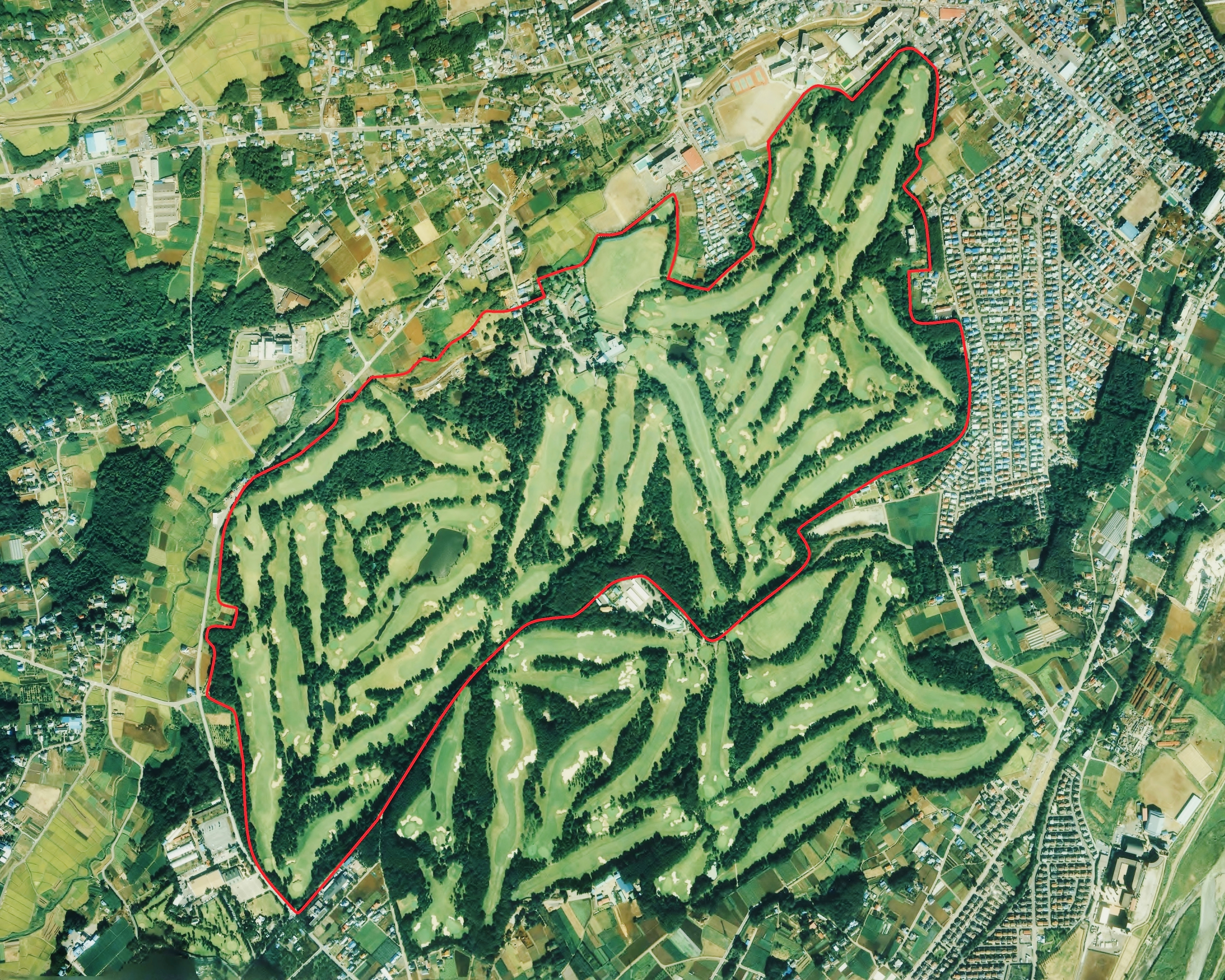
- An aerial photograph taken in 1989

- Location of Kasumigaseki Country Club
- 35°54′5″N 139°24′16″E

Club information
- Location: 3398 Kasahata, Kawagoe, Saitama, Japan
- Established: 1929
- Type: Private
- Owner: Kasumigaseki Country Club
- Operator: Kasumigaseki Country Club
- Tota holes: 18 x 2
- Website: kasumigasekicc.or.jp

East Course
- Designed by: Kinya Fujita, Shiro Akaboshi, and Charles H. Alison
- Par: 71
- Length: 7,466 yards (6,827 m)
- Course rating: 74.9
- Slope rating: 131

West Course
- Designed by: Seiichi Inoue
- Par: 73
- Length: 7,117 yards (6,508 m)
- Course rating: 74.1

Kasumigaseki Country Club (霞ヶ関カンツリー倶楽部) is a private golf course in Kawagoe, Saitama, Japan.

It opened on October 6, 1929, and was the first golf course in Saitama. It has hosted a number of professional and major amateur tournaments:

- Canada Cup – 1957
- Japan Open – 1933, 1956, 1995, 2006
- Japan Women's Open - 1999
- Japan Amateur – 1965, 1977
- Japan Women's Amateur – 1956, 1964, 1974
- Asian Amateur Championship – 2010

The East Course was the golf venue for the 2020 Summer Olympics.

== Scorecard ==
- East Course

| Tee | Rating/Slope | 1 | 2 | 3 | 4 | 5 | 6 | 7 | 8 | 9 | Out | 10 | 11 | 12 | 13 | 14 | 15 | 16 | 17 | 18 | In | Total |
| Tournament | M75.0/136 W81.9/148 | 411 | 381 | 459 | 237 | 640 | 386 | 217 | 586 | 521 487 | 3838 3804 | 189 | 461 | 499 | 398 | 632 596 | 403 | 203 | 343 | 500 466 | 3628 3558 | 7466 7362 |
| Black | M72.7/130 W79.0/142 | 399 | 372 | 426 | 200 | 590 | 360 | 194 | 569 | 445 | 3555 | 168 | 436 | 463 | 377 | 571 | 393 | 185 | 323 | 436 | 3352 | 6907 |
| Blue | M70.6/126 W76.4/136 | 379 | 358 | 393 | 177 | 550 | 334 | 170 | 539 | 408 | 3308 | 141 | 410 | 433 | 341 | 539 | 373 | 163 | 306 | 405 | 3111 | 6419 |
| White | M68.1/122 W73.4/129 | 347 | 329 | 364 | 149 | 507 | 302 | 139 | 494 | 374 | 3005 | 117 | 385 | 407 | 323 | 513 | 345 | 138 | 267 | 366 | 2861 | 5866 |
| Green | W70.1/122 | 323 | 294 | 333 | 128 | 462 | 249 | 124 | 442 | 351 | 2706 | 97 | 320 | 376 355 | 287 | 452 | 320 | 115 | 247 | 329 | 2522 | 5249 5228 |
| Par | | 4 | 4 | 4 | 3 | 5 | 4 | 3 | 5 | 4 | 36 | 3 | 4 | 4 | 4 | 5 | 4 | 3 | 4 | 4 | 35 | 71 |
| SI | | 9 | 15 | 3 | 13 | 1 | 7 | 11 | 5 | 17 | | 16 | 10 | 4 | 14 | 2 | 8 | 12 | 6 | 18 |

- West Course

| Tee | Rating/Slope | 1 | 2 | 3 | 4 | 5 | 6 | 7 | 8 | 9 | Out | 10 | 11 | 12 | 13 | 14 | 15 | 16 | 17 | 18 | In | Total |
| 2006 Japan Open | | 408 | 360 | 487 | 198 | 388 | 564 | 224 | 403 | 443 | 3475 | 542 | 205 | 400 | 479 | 380 | 580 | 163 | 390 | 454 | 3593 | 7068 |
| Par | | 4 | 4 | 4 | 3 | 4 | 5 | 3 | 4 | 4 | 35 | 5 | 3 | 4 | 4 | 4 | 5 | 3 | 4 | 4 | 36 | 71 |
| Black | M:73.8/134 W:80.5/141 | 408 | 356 | 502 | 198 | 388 | 554 | 224 | 401 | 440 | 3471 | 542 | 206 | 400 | 513 | 381 | 577 | 164 | 387 | 454 | 3624 | 7095 |
| Blue | M:71.6/130 W:77.9/135 | 392 | 325 | 478 | 155 | 348 | 546 | 209 | 390 | 384 | 3227 | 520 | 187 | 368 | 494 | 352 | 539 | 148 | 375 | 412 | 3395 | 6622 |
| White | M:70.0/127 W:75.9/131 | 376 | 303 | 429 | 133 | 326 | 537 | 190 | 379 | 349 | 3022 | 495 | 167 | 354 | 473 | 336 | 530 | 127 | 361 | 404 | 3247 | 6269 |
| Green | M:67.1/120 W:72.3/134 | 361 | 285 | 429 | 117 | 257 | 454 | 169 | 335 | 349 | 2756 | 427 | 151 | 310 | 423 | 306 | 448 | 112 | 330 | 357 | 2864 | 5620 |
| Par | | 4 | 4 | 5 | 3 | 4 | 5 | 3 | 4 | 4 | 36 | 5 | 3 | 4 | 5 | 4 | 5 | 3 | 4 | 4 | 37 | 73 |
| SI | | 9 | 15 | 3 | 13 | 7 | 1 | 11 | 5 | 17 | | 10 | 16 | 4 | 8 | 14 | 2 | 12 | 6 | 18 |

== Access ==
The nearest railway station is Kasahata Station on the Kawagoe Line.
