= Jun Takaku =

Japanese basketball player

Jun Takaku 高久順
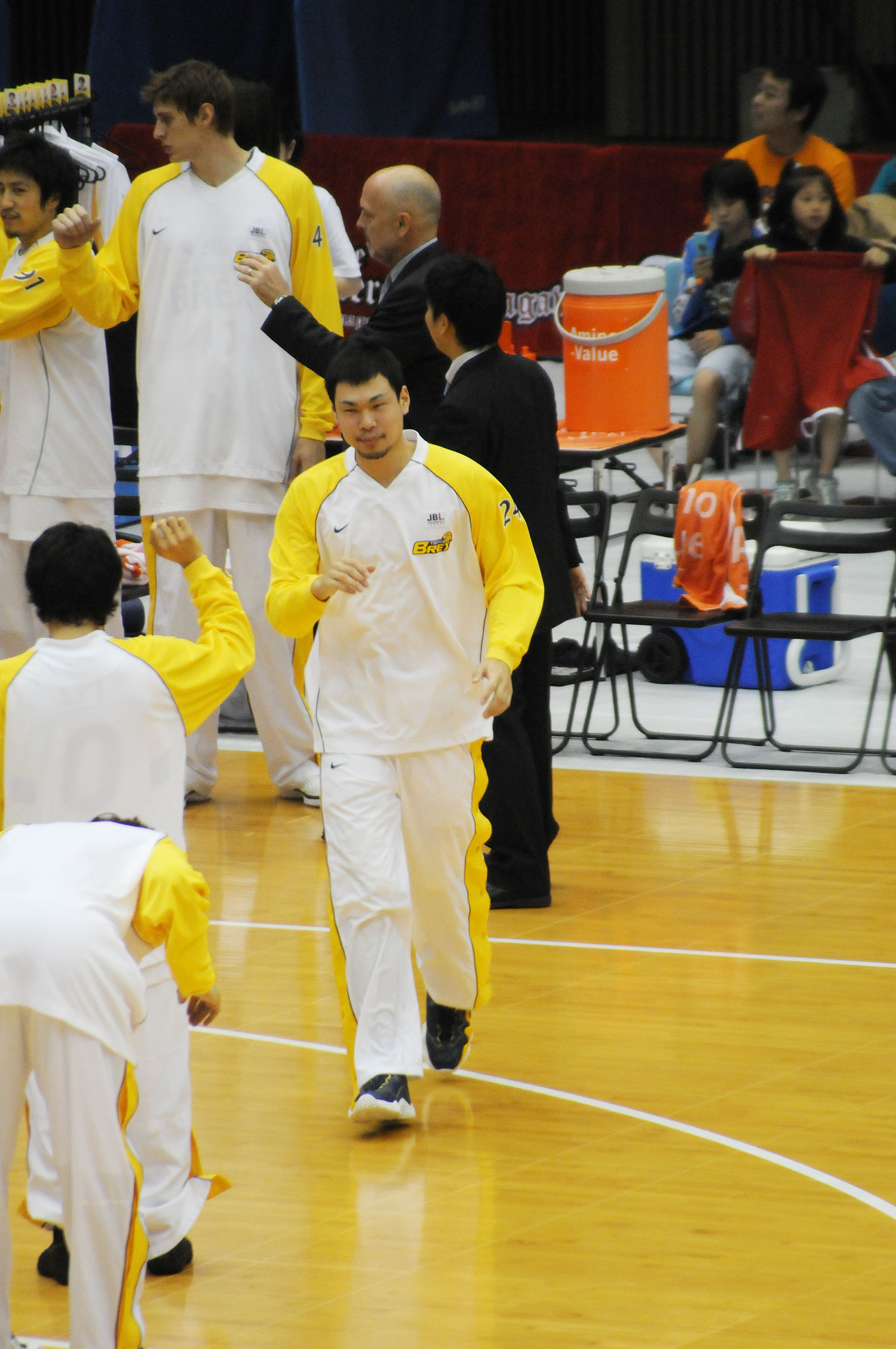

Personal information
- Born: May 12, 1984 (age 42) Tokyo
- Listed height: 6 ft 4 in (1.93 m)
- Listed weight: 198 lb (90 kg)

Career information
- High school: Noshiro Technical (Noshiro, Akita)
- College: Hosei University
- Position: Forward

Career history
- 2007-2008: Kotooka Taikyo
- 2008-2009: Link Tochigi Brex
- 2014: Japan national 3x3 team

Career highlights
- 3x Japanese High School Champion

Jun Takaku (born May 12, 1984) is a Japanese basketball player who played for Link Tochigi Brex and Japan national 3x3 team. He played college basketball for Hosei University.

== Career statistics ==
Legend
GP	Games played	GS	Games started	MPG	Minutes per game
FG%	Field goal percentage	3P%	3-point field goal percentage	FT%	Free throw percentage
RPG	Rebounds per game	APG	Assists per game	SPG	Steals per game
BPG	Blocks per game	PPG	Points per game	**Bold**	Career high

Year	Team	GP	GS	MPG	FG%	3P%	FT%	RPG	APG	SPG	BPG	PPG
2008-09	Tochigi	6		3.2	.429	.000	.000	0.7	0.0	0.2	0.0	1.0
