= Sumitomo Metal Sparks =

- Leagues: JBL
- Founded: 1958
- Folded: 1998
- Location: Osaka; Narashino, Chiba
- Championships: 4

The Sumitomo Metal Sparks were a Japanese basketball team that played in the Japan Basketball League. They were based in Narashino, Chiba.

== Notable players ==
- Makoto Akaho
- Dana Jones
- Paul Afeaki Khoury
- Deanthony Langston
- Yasutaka Okayama
- Shuji Ono
- Nobunaga Sato
- Kazuhiro Shoji
- Andre Spencer
