= Yuta Kobayashi =

Japanese basketball player (born 1987)

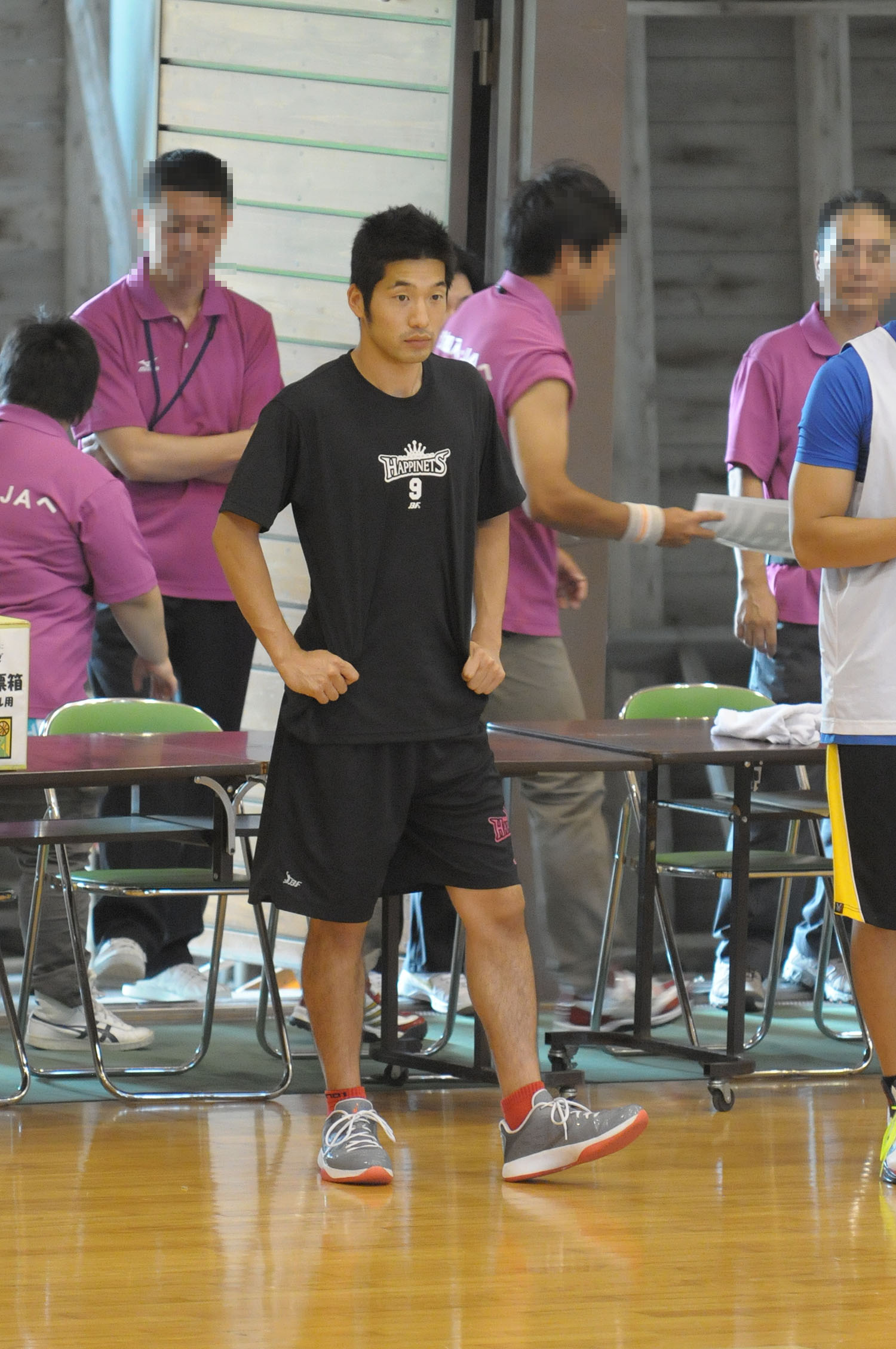
- Kobayashi at Gojome Gymnasium

Personal information
- Born: June 19, 1987 (age 39) Niigata, Niigata, Japan
- Listed height: 5 ft 11 in (1.80 m)
- Listed weight: 168 lb (76 kg)

Career information
- High school: Noshiro Technical (Noshiro, Akita)
- College: Akita Keizaihoka University
- Playing career: 2013–present

Career history
- 2013-2014: Akita Northern Happinets

Career highlights
- 3x Japanese High School Champions

Yuta Kobayashi (小林 祐太, Kobayashi Yūta; born June 19, 1987) is a Japanese former professional basketball player who played for the Akita Northern Happinets of the bj League in Japan. He was a man behind the mascot Bicky. He currently lives in Fukuoka Prefecture.

== Career statistics ==
Legend
GP	Games played	GS	Games started	MPG	Minutes per game
FG%	Field goal percentage	3P%	3-point field goal percentage	FT%	Free throw percentage
RPG	Rebounds per game	APG	Assists per game	SPG	Steals per game
BPG	Blocks per game	PPG	Points per game	**Bold**	Career high

=== Regular season ===
Year	Team	GP	GS	MPG	FG%	3P%	FT%	RPG	APG	SPG	BPG	PPG
2013-14	Akita	16		2.9	.286	.000	.250	0.4	0.2	0.1	0	0.6

=== Playoffs ===
Year	Team	GP	GS	MPG	FG%	3P%	FT%	RPG	APG	SPG	BPG	PPG
2013-14	Akita	2	0	1.50	.000	.000	.000	00	0.0	0.5	0	0
