= Mitsuhiko Kato =

Japanese basketball player and coach

Bunri University of Hospitality
- Position: Head coach

Personal information
- Born: May 5, 1962 (age 64) Omori, Akita

Career information
- High school: Noshiro Technical (Noshiro, Akita)
- College: Tsukuba University
- Coaching career: 1987–present

Career history

Playing
- 1985-1987: Akita Isuzu Motors

Coaching
- 1987-1990: Noshiro Technical High School (asst)
- 1990-2008: Noshiro Technical High School
- 2008: Link Tochigi Brex
- 2011-present: Bunri University of Hospitality

Career highlights
- As coach: 29x Japanese High School Champions

Mitsuhiko Kato (加藤三彦, Katō Mitsuhiko; born May 5, 1962), nicknamed Semi, is a current college basketball head coach for Bunri University of Hospitality in Japan and the former head coach for Noshiro Technical High School and Link Tochigi Brex.

== Head coaching record ==
Legend
Regular season	G	Games coached	W	Games won	L	Games lost	W–L %	Win–loss %
Playoffs	PG	Playoff games	PW	Playoff wins	PL	Playoff losses	PW–L %	Playoff win–loss %

Team	Year	G	W	L	W–L%	Finish	PG	PW	PL	PW–L%	Result
Link Tochigi Brex	2008-09	10	3	7	.300	Fired	-	-	-	–	
