= Andre Spencer =

American basketball player (1964–2020)

Personal information
- Born: July 20, 1964 Stockton, California, U.S.
- Died: August 4, 2020 (aged 56)
- Listed height: 6 ft 6 in (1.98 m)
- Listed weight: 210 lb (95 kg)

Career information
- High school: Manual Arts (Los Angeles, California)
- College: Bakersfield College (1982–1984); Northern Arizona (1984–1986)
- NBA draft: 1986: undrafted
- Playing career: 1986–2002
- Position: Small forward
- Number: 24, 12, 20

Career history
- 1986–1987: Alviks BK
- 1987–1988: Wyoming Wildcatters
- 1988–1989: Cedar Rapids Silver Bullets
- 1989: Topeka Sizzlers
- 1990–1991: Rockford Lightning
- 1990–1992: Maccabi Rishon LeZion
- 1992–1994: Rockford Lightning
- 1992–1993: Atlanta Hawks
- 1993: Golden State Warriors
- 1994: Sacramento Kings
- 1994: Oklahoma City Cavalry
- 1994–1995: Estudiantes Caja Postal
- 1995–1996: JDA Dijon
- 1996: Hapoel Tel Aviv
- 1996–1997: LaCrosse Bobcats
- 1996–1997: Grand Rapids Hoops
- 1997–1998: Sumitomo Metal Sparks
- 1998: Andino La Rioja
- 1998–2001: Ironi Ramat Gan
- 2001–2002: Hapoel Afula/Gilboa

Career highlights
- All-CBA First Team (1993); First-team All-Big Sky (1986)
- Stats at NBA.com
- Stats at Basketball Reference

Andre Devell Spencer (July 20, 1964 – August 4, 2020) was an American professional basketball player. He was a 6-foot-6-inch (198 cm) 210 pounds (95 kg) forward and played collegiately for Bakersfield College, a junior college, and the Northern Arizona Lumberjacks. He played for three teams in the National Basketball Association (NBA), and for six seasons in the Israeli Basketball Premier League.

== Biography ==
He played basketball for Los Angeles-Manual Arts High. He then played basketball for the Bakersfield College Renegades from 1982 to 1984. He then attended Northern Arizona University where he earned all-Big Sky Conference honors for the Lumberjacks in 1986. In 1985 he was second in steals (47) and steals per game (1.6) in the Big Sky Conference, third in points (548) and points per game (18.9), and 8th in rebounds (174) and rebounds per game (8.0).

Spencer played for the Atlanta Hawks, Golden State Warriors, and Sacramento Kings during his NBA career from 1992 to 1994. Although he was also signed by the Miami Heat in October 1994, he was waived a few days later, before the 1994–95 season began.

He made it to the Israeli League finals in 1991 with Maccabi Rishon LeZion of the Israeli Basketball Premier League. The following year he averaged 21.4 points per game for the team, his career-high in his six seasons in Israel. He also played in Israel for Hapoel Tel Aviv, Ironi Ramat Gan, and Hapoel Afula. Spencer also played in France for JDA Dijon.

Spencer played in the Continental Basketball Association (CBA) for the Wyoming Wildcatters, Cedar Rapids Silver Bullets, Topeka Sizzlers, Rockford Lightning, Oklahoma City Cavalry and La Crosse Bobcats. He was selected to the All-CBA First Team in 1993.

Spencer died August 4, 2020, aged 56.
