= Nobunaga Sato =

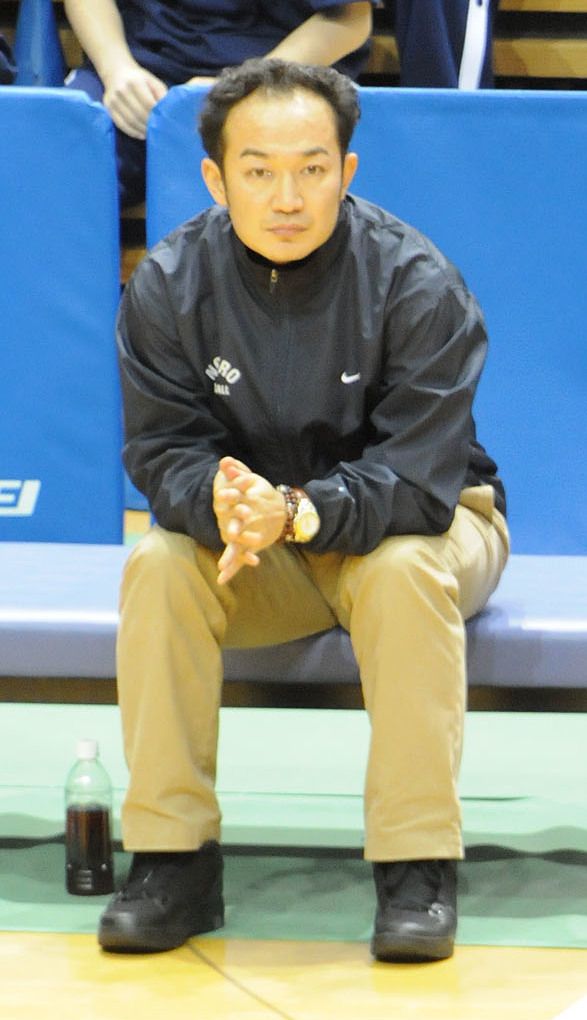

Toyo University
- Position: Head coach

Personal information
- Born: July 29, 1970 (age 56) Higashikurume, Tokyo
- Listed height: 5 ft 7 in (1.70 m)
- Listed weight: 159 lb (72 kg)

Career information
- High school: Noshiro Technical (Noshiro, Akita)
- College: Meiji University
- Coaching career: 2008–present

Career history

Playing
- 1993-1998: Sumitomo Metal Sparks
- 1998-2005: Aisin SeaHorses Mikawa
- 2005-2006: Fukuoka Red Falcons
- 2006-2008: Panasonic Trians

Coaching
- 2008–2015: Noshiro Technical High School
- 2015–2018: Aomori Wat's
- 2018-present: Toyo University

Career highlights
- As player: JBL free throw percentage leader (1999)

Nobunaga Sato (佐藤信長, Satō Nobunaga; born July 29, 1970) is a former professional basketball head coach for Aomori Wat's in Japan and the former head coach for Noshiro Technical High School in Noshiro, Akita.

== Head coaching record ==
Legend
Regular season	G	Games coached	W	Games won	L	Games lost	W–L %	Win–loss %
Playoffs	PG	Playoff games	PW	Playoff wins	PL	Playoff losses	PW–L %	Playoff win–loss %

Team	Year	G	W	L	W–L%	Finish	PG	PW	PL	PW–L%	Result
Aomori Wat's	2015-2016	52	23	29	.442	8th in Bj Eastern	2	0	2	.000	Lost in first round
Aomori Wat's	2016-2017	60	29	31	.483	4th in B2 Eastern	-	-	-	–	
Aomori Wat's	2017-2018	38	9	29	.237	Fired	-	-	-	–	
