= Golf at the 2020 Summer Olympics =

Golf at the Games of the XXXII Olympiad
- Venue: Kasumigaseki Country Club; East Course
- Dates: 29 July – 1 August 2021 (men); 4–7 August 2021 (women)
- No. of events: 2
- Competitors: 120 from 42 nations

Golf at the 2020 Summer Olympics in Tokyo, Japan featured two events, individual competitions for men and women.

Golf returned to the Olympics in 2016, for the first time since 1904. The 2020 qualification system and format of the events were the same as used in 2016. 60 players qualified for each event, which consisted of a 72-hole individual stroke play tournament, played over four days. The men's event was played first, starting on 29 July, with the women's event starting on 4 August. Due to the COVID-19 pandemic, this was played behind closed doors.

== Venue ==
The tournaments were played on the East course at Kasumigaseki Country Club.

== Qualification ==
Qualification was based on the world rankings as of 21 June 2021 (men) and 28 June 2021 (women), with a total of 60 players qualifying in each of the men's and women's events. The top 15 players of each gender qualified, with a limit of four golfers per country that could qualify this way. The remaining spots went to the highest-ranked players from countries that did not already have two golfers qualified. The IGF guaranteed that at least one golfer from the host nation and each geographical region (Africa, the Americas, Asia, Europe, and Oceania) would qualify. The IGF posted weekly lists of qualifiers based on the current rankings for men and women.

== Competition schedule ==
R1	Round 1	R2	Round 2	R3	Round 3	FR	Final round

Event↓/Date →	Jul 29	Jul 30	Jul 31	Aug 1	Aug 2	Aug 3	Aug 4	Aug 5	Aug 6	Aug 7
Men's individual	R1	R2	R3	FR						
Women's individual							R1	R2	R3	FR

== Participating nations ==
The list shows the number of participating athletes from each nation.

- Argentina (1)
- Australia (4)
- Austria (3)
- Belgium (3)
- Canada (4)
- Chile (2)
- China (4)
- Chinese Taipei (3)
- Colombia (2)
- Czech Republic (2)
- Denmark (4)
- Ecuador (1)
- Finland (4)
- France (4)
- Germany (4)
- Great Britain (4)
- Hong Kong (1)
- India (4)
- Ireland (4)
- Italy (4)
- Japan (4)
- Malaysia (2)
- Mexico (4)
- Morocco (1)
- Netherlands (1)
- New Zealand (2)
- Norway (3)
- Paraguay (1)
- Philippines (3)
- Poland (1)
- Puerto Rico (2)
- South Africa (2)
- South Korea (6)
- Slovakia (1)
- Slovenia (1)
- Spain (4)
- Sweden (4)
- Switzerland (2)
- Thailand (4)
- United States (8)
- Venezuela (1)
- Zimbabwe (1)

== Events ==
=== Medal summary ===
* Host nation (Japan)

Rank	NOC	Gold	Silver	Bronze	Total
1	United States	2	0	0	2
2	Japan*	0	1	0	1
2	Slovakia	0	1	0	1
4	Chinese Taipei	0	0	1	1
4	New Zealand	0	0	1	1
Totals (5 entries)		2	2	2	6

=== Medalists ===
Event	Gold	Silver	Bronze
Men's individual	Xander Schauffele; United States	Rory Sabbatini; Slovakia	Pan Cheng-tsung; Chinese Taipei
Women's individual	Nelly Korda; United States	Mone Inami; Japan	Lydia Ko; New Zealand
