= Tomohide Utsumi =

Japanese basketball coach (born 1958)

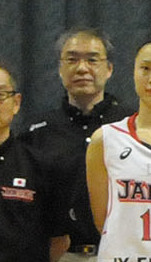
- Utsumi at Akita Municipal Gymnasium in 2014

Hitachi High-Technologies Cougars
- Position: Head coach
- League: Women's Japan Basketball League

Personal information
- Born: December 7, 1958 (age 67) Misawa, Aomori

Career information
- High school: Noshiro Technical (Noshiro, Akita)
- College: Nippon Sport Science University
- Coaching career: 1988–present

Career history

Playing
- 1981–1988: Nippon Mining

Coaching
- 1988–2000: Sapporo University
- 2001-2012: Japan Energy Sunflowers
- 2003–04 2006–2008 2012-2016: Japan National Women
- 2017-2018: Levanga Hokkaido (advisory)
- 2018-2020: Levanga Hokkaido
- 2020-present: Hitachi High-Technologies Cougars

Tomohide Utsumi (内海 知秀, Utsumi Tomohide) is a Japanese basketball coach. He coached the Japanese women's national team at the 2016 Summer Olympics, where the team finished eighth.

== Personal ==
His son, Shingo Utsumi is a professional basketball player for the Kyoto Hannaryz.

== Head coaching record ==
Legend
Regular season	G	Games coached	W	Games won	L	Games lost	W–L %	Win–loss %
Playoffs	PG	Playoff games	PW	Playoff wins	PL	Playoff losses	PW–L %	Playoff win–loss %

Team	Year	G	W	L	W–L%	Finish	PG	PW	PL	PW–L%	Result
Levanga Hokkaido	2018-19	41	6	35	.146	6th in Eastern	-	-	-	–	-
Levanga Hokkaido	2019-20	40	13	27	.325	6th in Eastern	-	-	-	–	-
