= Shingo Utsumi =

Japanese basketball player

Shingo Utsumi 内海慎吾
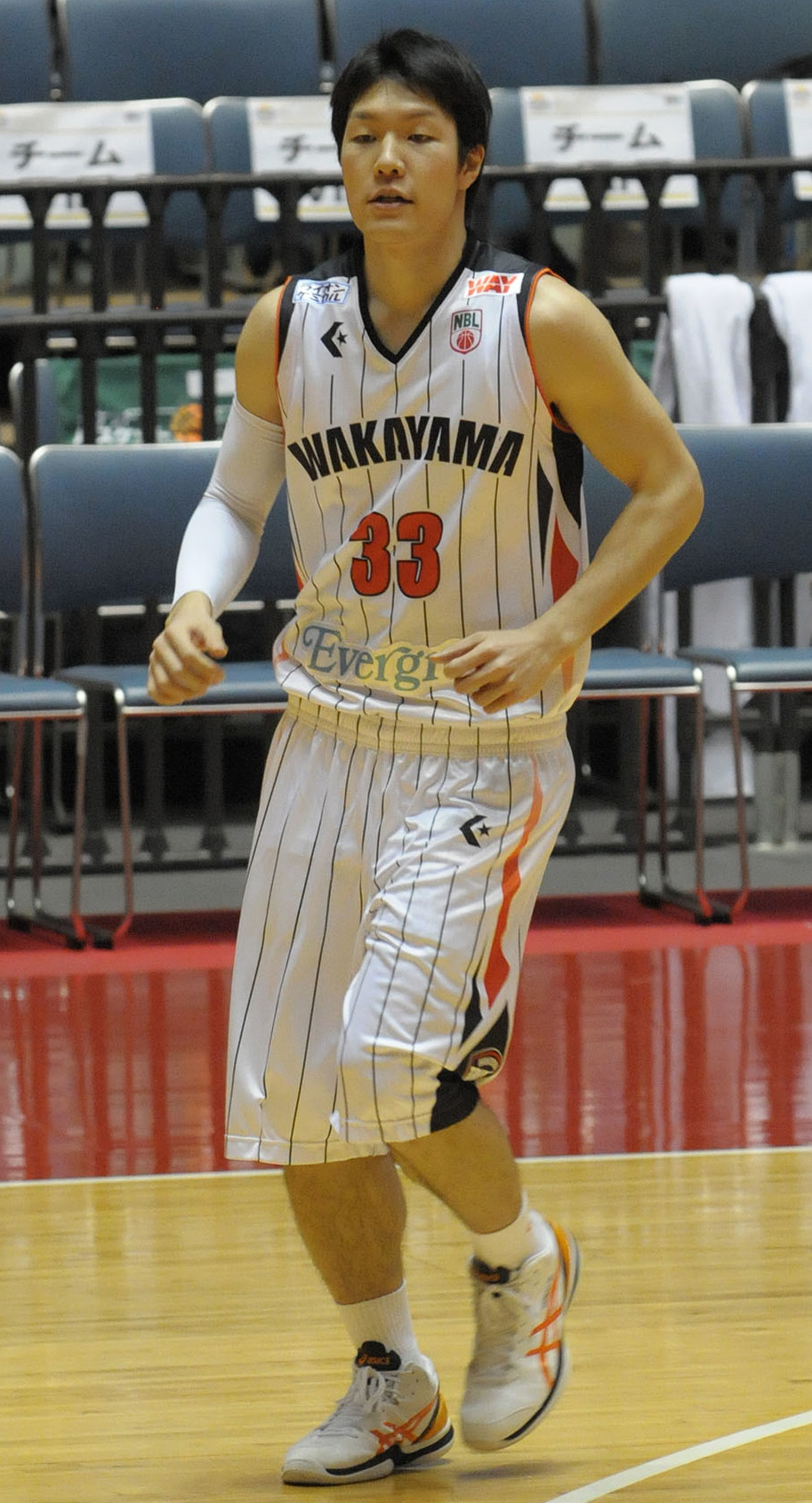
- Utsumi in 2014

No. 33 – Kyoto Hannaryz
- Position: Shooting Guard
- League: B.League

Personal information
- Born: April 28, 1984 (age 42) Kitahiroshima, Hokkaido
- Listed height: 6 ft 2 in (1.88 m)
- Listed weight: 194 lb (88 kg)

Career information
- High school: Noshiro Technical (Noshiro, Akita)
- College: Tokai University
- Playing career: 2007-–present

Career history
- 2007-2013: Mitsubishi Electric
- 2013-2014: Wakayama Trians
- 2014-present: Kyoto Hannaryz

Career highlights
- 2x Japanese college champions

Shingo Utsumi (born April 28, 1984) is a Japanese professional basketball player who plays for the Kyoto Hannaryz of the B.League in Japan.

== Personal ==
His father, Tomohide Utsumi is a head coach for the Levanga Hokkaido.

== Career statistics ==
Legend
GP	Games played	GS	Games started	MPG	Minutes per game
FG%	Field goal percentage	3P%	3-point field goal percentage	FT%	Free throw percentage
RPG	Rebounds per game	APG	Assists per game	SPG	Steals per game
BPG	Blocks per game	PPG	Points per game	**Bold**	Career high

Year	Team	GP	GS	MPG	FG%	3P%	FT%	RPG	APG	SPG	BPG	PPG
2007-08	Mitsubishi	25		8.5	.404	.457	.833	0.6	0.2	0.2	0.0	2.5
2008-09	Mitsubishi	35		19.4	.383	.364	.714	1.3	1.0	0.4	0.1	5.7
2009-10	Mitsubishi	40		22.3	.376	.297	.741	1.2	0.8	0.6	0.1	7.9
2010-11	Mitsubishi	36		22.4	.337	.267	.786	1.8	0.9	0.4	0.2	5.3
2011-12	Mitsubishi	42	7	18.2	.387	.360	.824	1.3	0.6	0.3	0.1	5.5
2012-13	Mitsubishi	41	29	20.0	.416	.404	.529	1.1	0.6	0.4	0.1	4.1
2013-14	Wakayama	53	28	21.1	.417	.382	.679	1.3	1.2	0.3	0.1	4.8
2014-15	Kyoto	52	22	20.1	.419	.446	.778	1.5	1.1	0.6	0.1	5.5
2015-16	Kyoto	51	51	25.1	.405	.420	.813	2.2	1.0	0.4	0.1	7.1
2016-17	Kyoto	60	41	25.5	.365	.363	.855	2.0	0.4	0.6	0.1	5.7
2017-18	Kyoto	60	4	18.5	.384	.387	.898	1.2	0.6	0.5	0.1	3.9

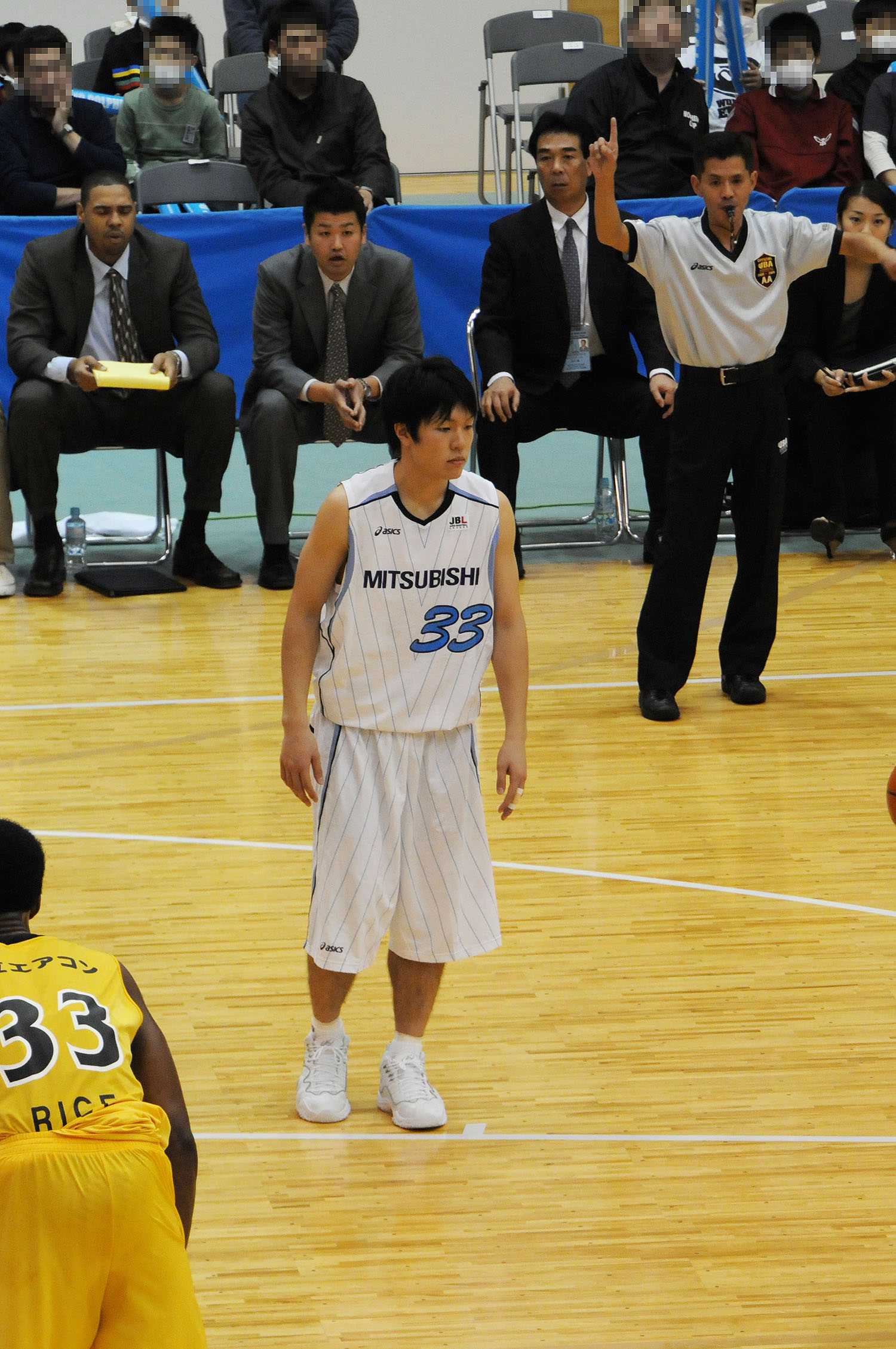
