= Takumi Hasegawa (basketball) =

Japanese basketball player

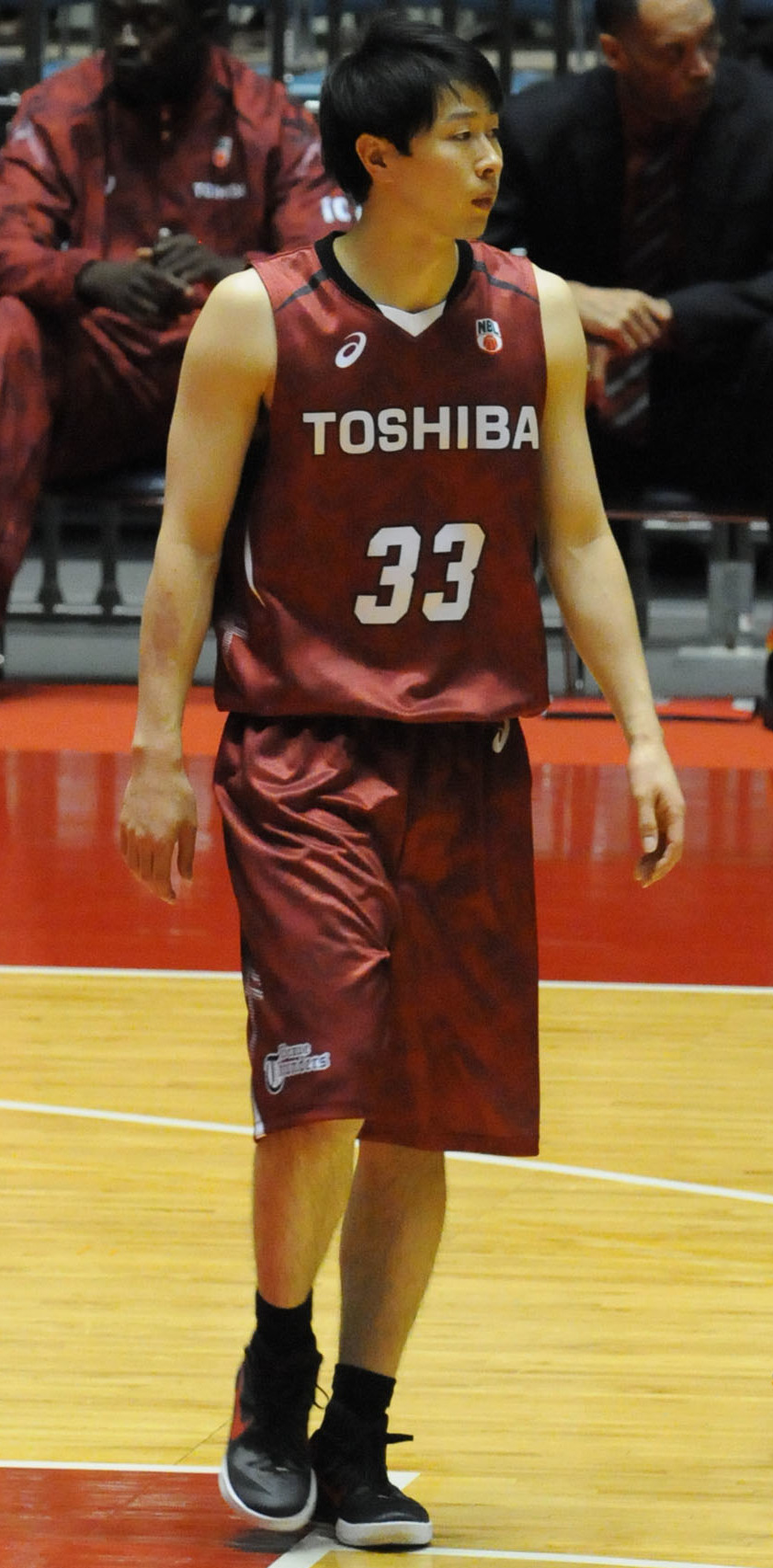
- Hasegawa in 2015

No. 33 – Kawasaki Brave Thunders
- Position: Small forward
- League: B.League

Personal information
- Born: July 21, 1989 (age 37) Hanamaki, Iwate
- Listed height: 1.91 m (6 ft 3 in)
- Listed weight: 88 kg (194 lb)

Career information
- High school: Noshiro Technical (Noshiro, Akita)
- College: Takushoku University

Career history
- 2012–present: Kawasaki Brave Thunders

Takumi Hasegawa (長谷川 技, Hasegawa Takumi; born July 21, 1989) is a Japanese professional basketball player the Kawasaki Brave Thunders of the Japanese B.League.

== Stats ==
Legend
GP	Games played	GS	Games started	MPG	Minutes per game
FG%	Field goal percentage	3P%	3-point field goal percentage	FT%	Free throw percentage
RPG	Rebounds per game	APG	Assists per game	SPG	Steals per game
BPG	Blocks per game	PPG	Points per game	**Bold**	Career high

Year	Team	GP	GS	MPG	FG%	3P%	FT%	RPG	APG	SPG	BPG	PPG
JBL 2012-13	Toshiba	10		2.7	.182	.000	.500	0.6	0.2	0	0	0.5
NBL 2013-14	Toshiba Kanagawa	42		9.5	.400	.268	.867	0.9	0.4	0.2	0.0	2.4
NBL 2014-15	Toshiba Kanagawa	42	3	13.4	.448	.333	.731	1.1	0.6	0.6	0.1	3.7
NBL 2015-16	Toshiba Kanagawa	49	35	21.4	.441	.370	.778	1.9	1.3	0.7	0.1	4.6
B1 2016-17	Kawasaki	59	58	22.9	.433	.418	.880	1.6	1.9	0.5	0.1	5.7
2017-18	Kawasaki	57	57	24.6	.409	.401	.810	1.8	2.4	0.9	0.1	5.8
