= Saitama Women's Junior College =

Coordinates: 35°53′42.1″N 139°21′32.2″E

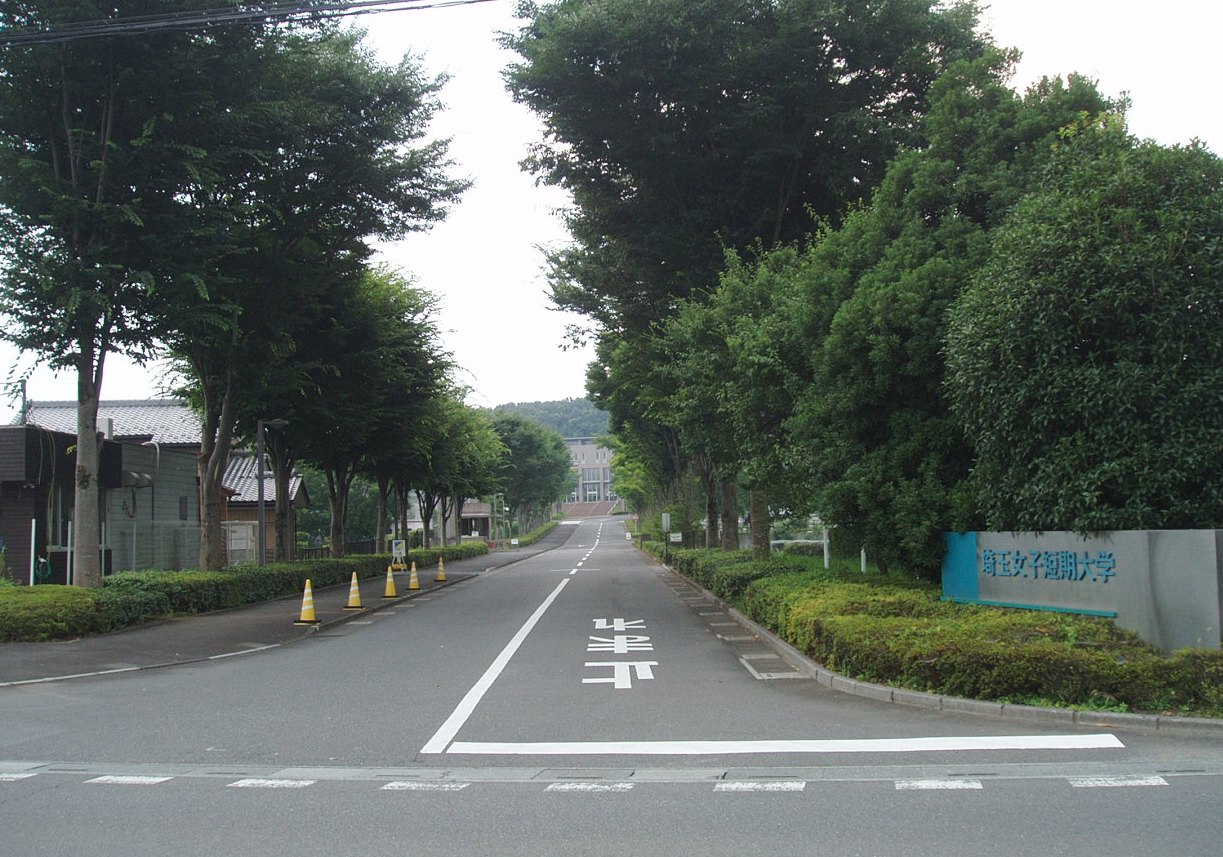
Entrance

Saitama Women's Junior College (埼玉女子短期大学, Saitama joshi tanki daigaku) is a private women's junior college in Hidaka, Saitama, Japan, established in 1989.
