= Noshiro Technical High School =

High school in Akita, Japan

- 能代工業高等学校
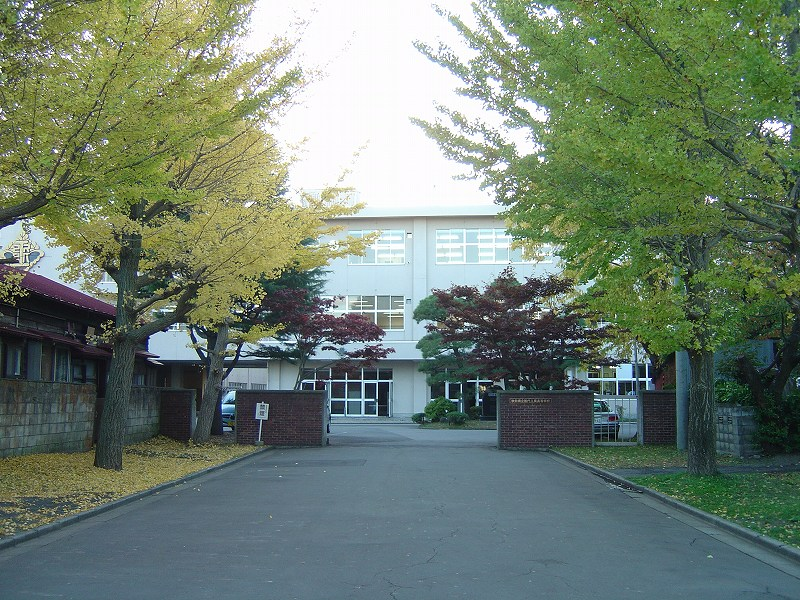

Location
- Hannyamachi 3-1; Noshiro; Akita 016-0896; Japan
- Coordinates: 40°12′40.51″N 140°1′13.12″E

Information
- Funding type: Public school
- Established: 1912
- Status: Open
- Closed: March 2021
- School board: Akita Prefectural Board of Education
- School code: 05118H
- Years offered: High school (10-12)
- Gender: Mixed
- Language: Japanese
- Website: www.noshitech-h.akita-pref.ed.jp

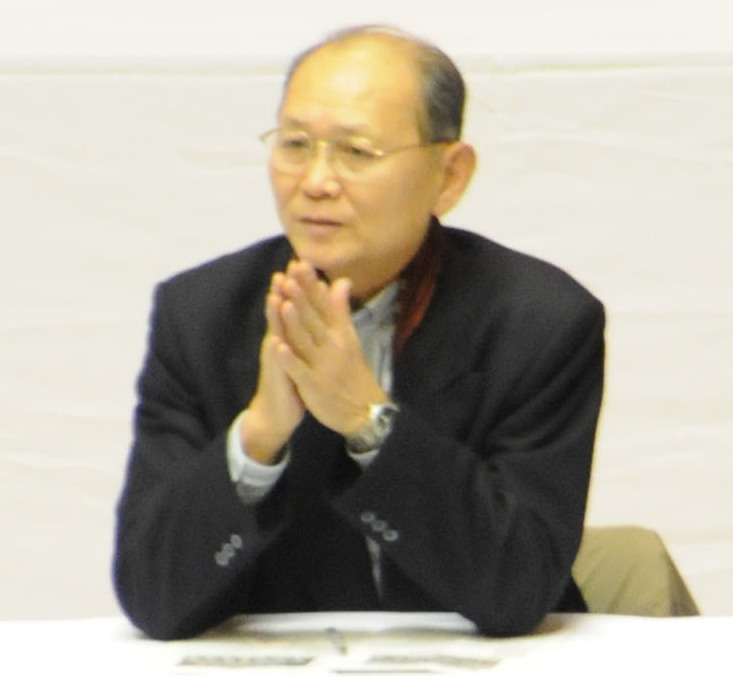
Former basketball Head Coach Hiroshi Kato

Noshiro Technical High School (秋田県立能代工業高等学校, Akitakenritsu Noshiro Kōgyō Kōtō Gakkō) is a high school located in Noshiro, Akita, Japan. It was established in 1912 and is best known for its powerhouse basketball team that won national championships 58 times.

== Notable alumni ==
- Shinji Akiba
- Keishi Handa
- Makoto Hasegawa
- Takumi Hasegawa
- Yuta Kobayashi
- Seiichi Oba
- Shuji Ono
- Kiyomi Sato
- Mitsuaki Sato
- Nobunaga Sato
- Kimikazu Suzuki
- Yuta Tabuse
- Jun Takaku
- Kenta Tateyama
- Kazuki Tomokawa
- Shingo Utsumi
- Tomohide Utsumi
- Kenji Yamada
- Koji Yamamoto

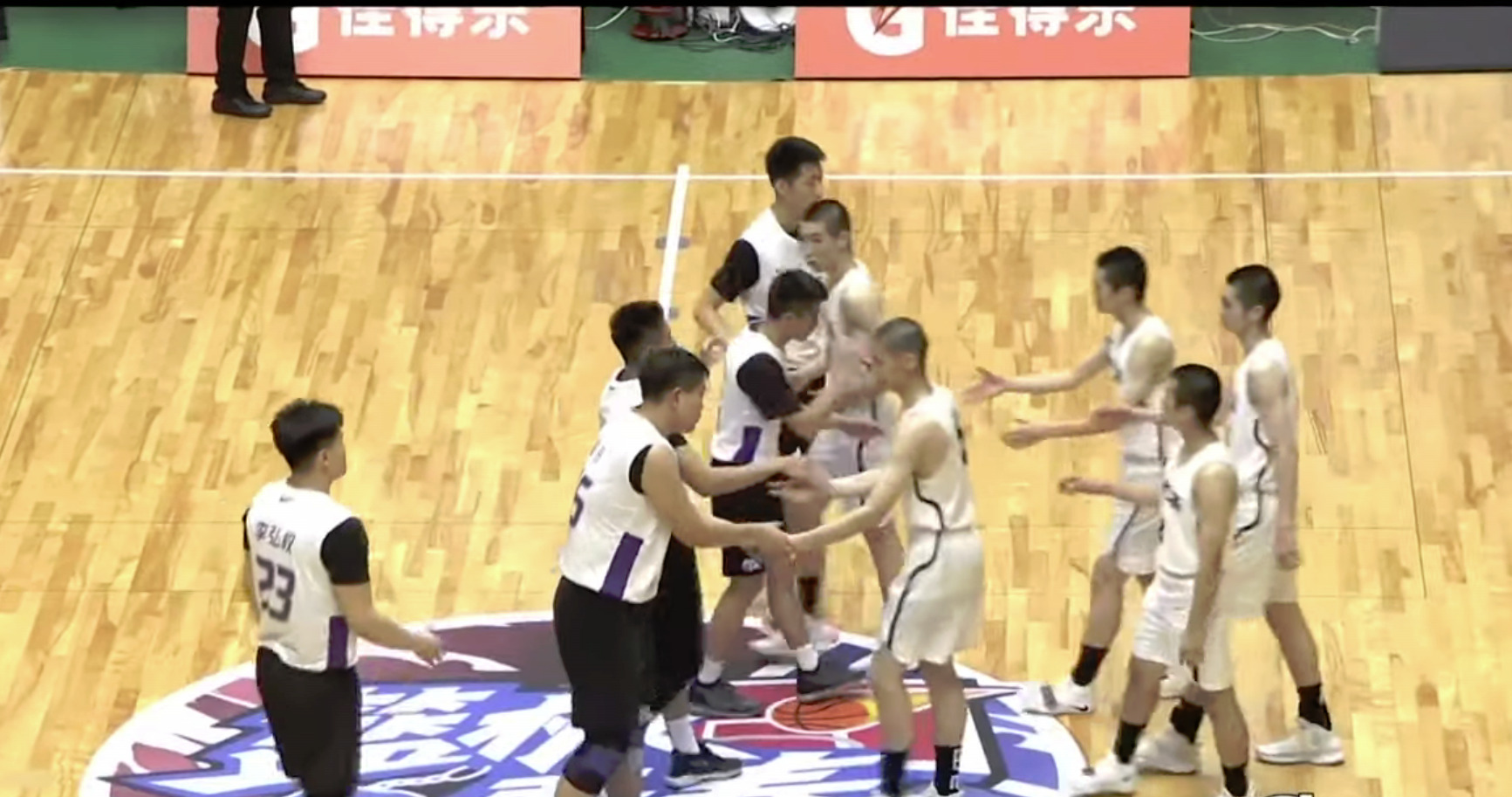
Basketball team

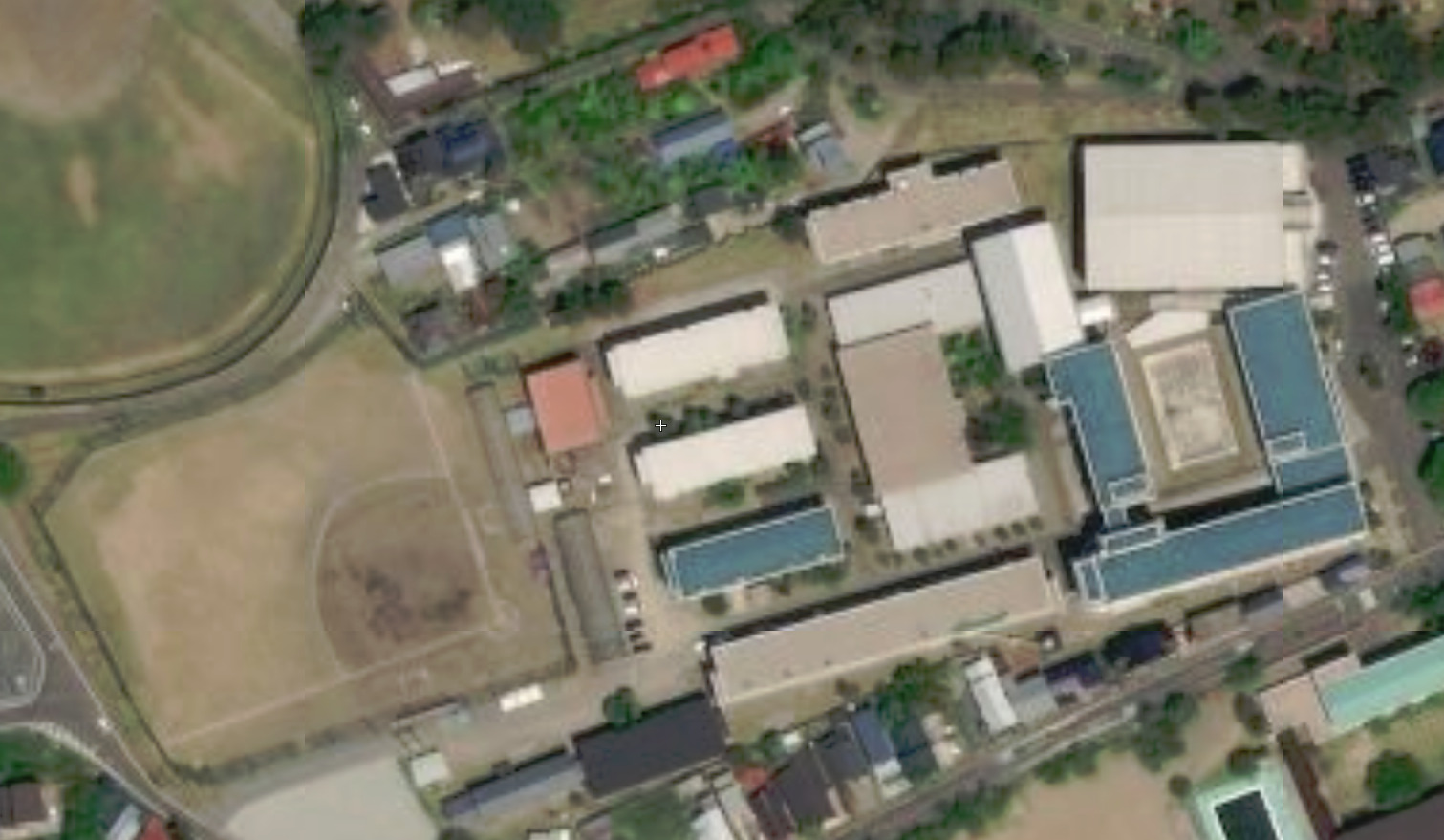
Satellite view

== See also ==
- Slam Dunk (manga)
- Sannoh Industry Affiliated High School
- Takehiko Inoue
