= Bunri University of Hospitality =

Private university in Saitama, Japan

Coordinates: 35°55′36.9″N 139°25′9.1″E

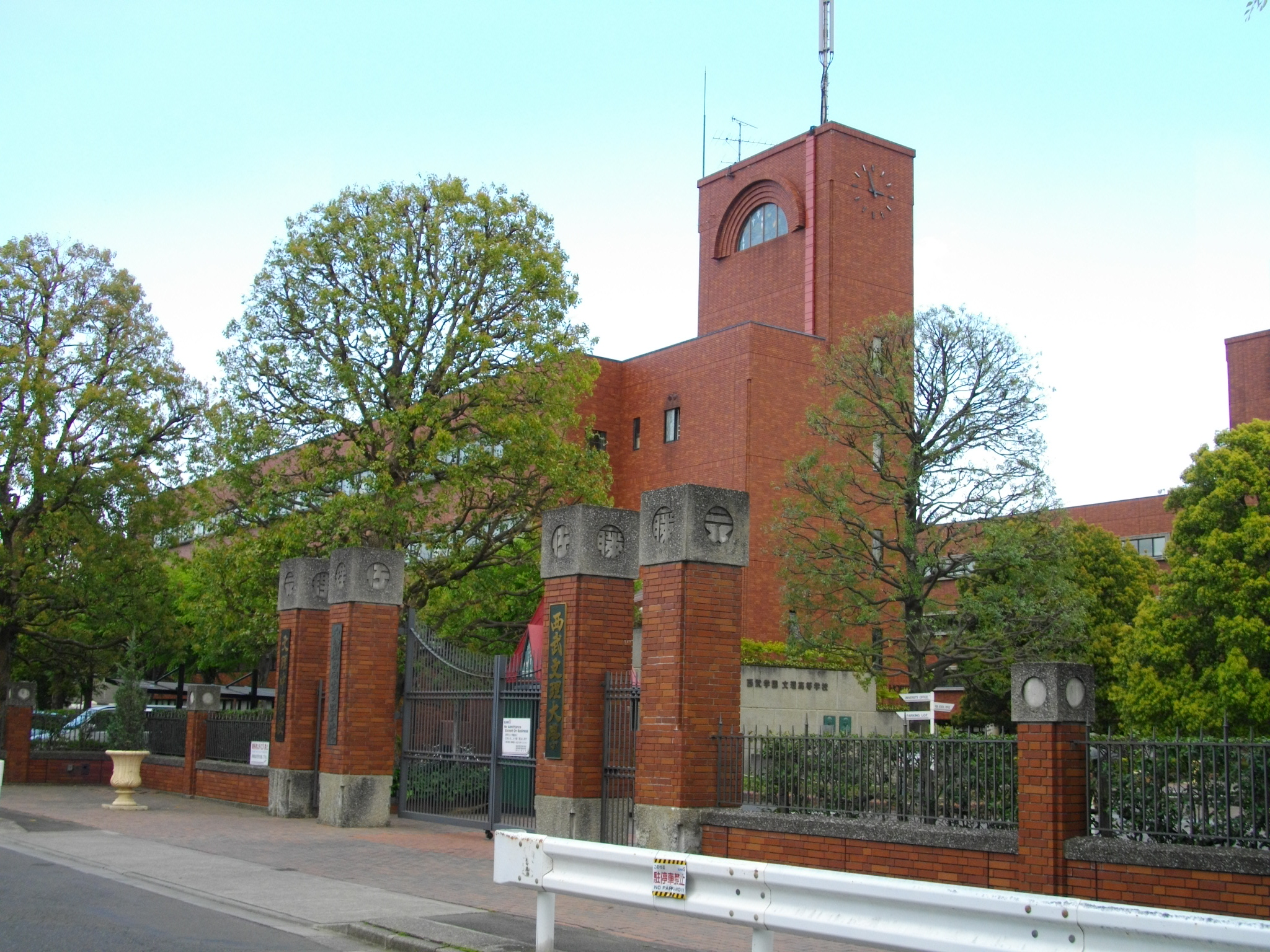
Bunri University of Hospitality

Bunri University of Hospitality (西武文理大学, Seibu bunri daigaku) is a private university in Sayama, Saitama, Japan, established in 1999.

The predecessor of the school was founded in 1974. In 1988, it became a junior college specializing in small business administration. In 1999, it was elevated to a four-year college, specializing in management of service industries. In 2007, a department of health care management was added. A nursing school was added in 2009.
