= Japan National Route 407 =

Road in Japan

National Route 407
- 国道407号
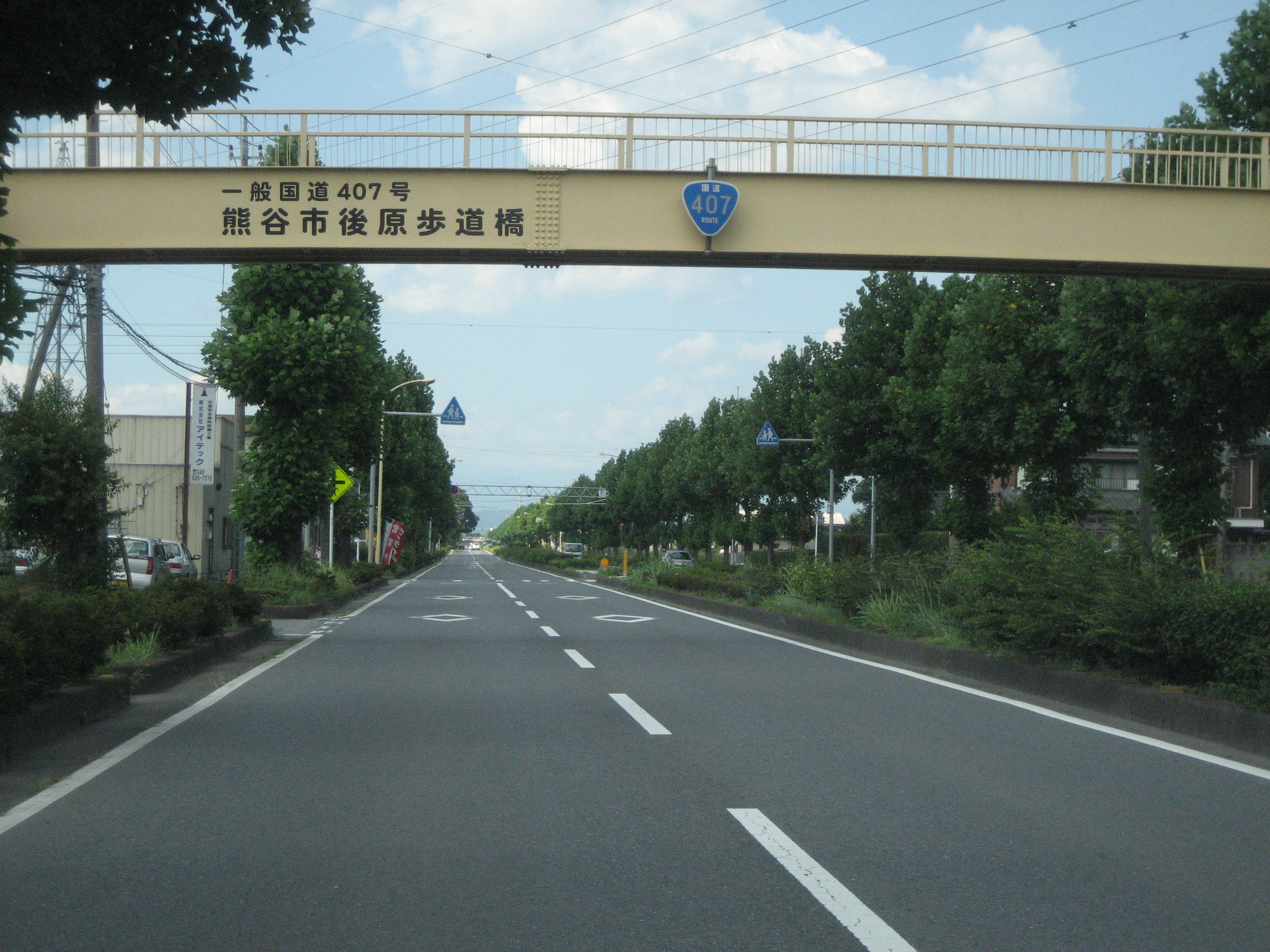

Route information
- Length: 60.4 km (37.5 mi)

Location
- Country: Japan

Highway system
- National highways of Japan; Expressways of Japan
← National Route 406	→ National Route 408

National Route 407 (国道407号, Kokudō 407-gō) is a national highway connecting the Ashikaga, Tochigi and Iruma, Saitama in Japan, and spans a total length of 60.4 km (37.53 mi).
