= Aichi Gakusen University =

- 愛知学泉大学
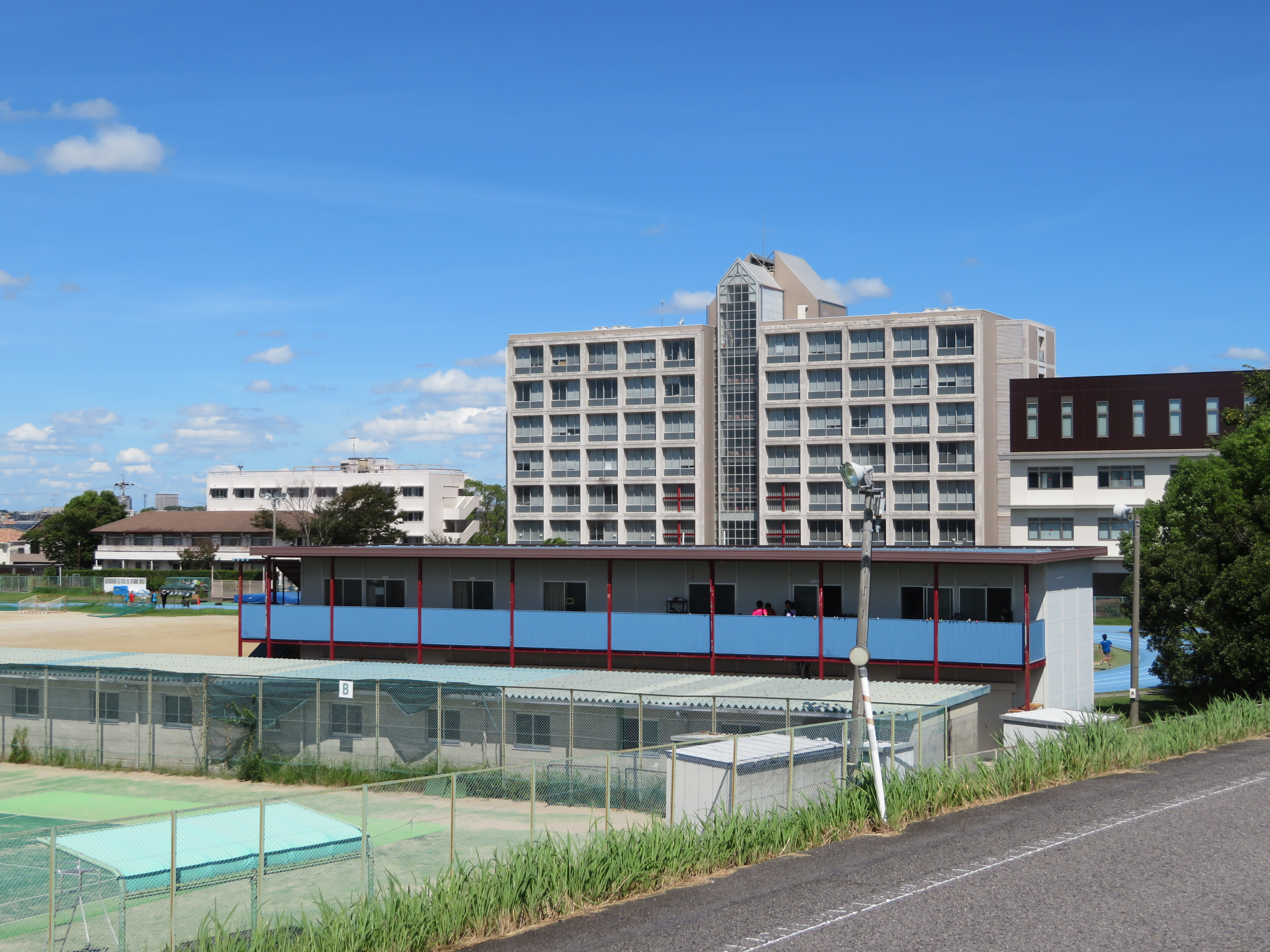
- Aichi Gakusen University, Okazaki campus
- Type: Private
- Established: 1966
- Location: Toyota, Aichi; Okazaki, Aichi, Japan; Okazaki: 34.972°N 137.144°E; Toyota: 35.104°N 137.125°E
- Campus: Multiple campuses

Aichi Gakusen University (愛知学泉大学, aichi gakusen daigaku) is a private university with campuses in Okazaki, Aichi and Toyota, Aichi, Japan. The school was established in 1966 as a women's college. Later it became co-educational.
