= 2016–17 B.League season =

Season of Japanese men's basketball

- League: B.League
- Season: 2016–17
- Duration: September 22, 2016 – May 7, 2017

B1 Regular season
- Season MVP: Nick Fazekas
- Promoted: (B1) Nishinomiya Storks, Shimane Susanoo Magic (B2) Kanazawa Samuraiz, Rizing Zephyr Fukuoka
- Relegated: (B2) Sendai 89ers, Akita Happinets (B3) Tokyo Excellence, Kagoshima Rebnise

B1 Finals
- Champions: Link Tochigi Brex
- Runners-up: Kawasaki Brave Thunders
- Finals MVP: Takatoshi Furukawa

Statistical leaders
- Points: Nick Fazekas
- Rebounds: Ryan Rossiter
- Assists: Naoki Uto

Records
- Highest attendance: 7,327
- Lowest attendance: 884
- Attendance: 1,482,462
- Average attendance: 2,754

The 2016–17 B.League season was the first season of the Japanese B.League.

== B1 Regular season ==
#	B1	W	L	PCT	GB	GP
1	Toshiba Kawasaki Brave Thunders	49	11	.817	—	60
2	Link Tochigi Brex	46	14	.767	3	60
3	SeaHorses Mikawa	46	14	.733	3	60
4	Alvark Tokyo	44	16	.733	5	60
5	Chiba Jets	44	16	.733	5	60
6	San-en NeoPhoenix	33	27	.550	16	60
7	Hitachi SunRockers Tokyo-Shibuya	32	28	.533	17	60
8	Ryukyu Golden Kings	29	31	.483	20	60
9	Osaka Evessa	28	32	.467	21	60
10	Niigata Albirex BB	27	33	.450	22	60
11	Nagoya Diamond Dolphins	27	33	.450	23	60
12	Kyoto Hannaryz	25	35	.417	23	60
13	Levanga Hokkaido	23	37	.383	26	60
14	Shiga Lakestars	21	39	.350	28	60
15	Toyama Grouses	18	42	.300	31	60
16	Akita Northern Happinets	18	42	.300	31	60
17	Yokohama B-Corsairs	16	44	.267	33	60
18	Sendai 89ers	14	46	.233	35	60

== B1 Playoffs ==
Quarter-finals
1 Kawasaki Brave Thunders	89	98
8 Hitachi Sun Rockers	75	82
4 Alvark Tokyo	90	83
5 San-en NeoPhoenix	75	74
3 SeaHorses Mikawa	76	81
6 Ryukyu Golden Kings	72	75
2 Link Tochigi Brex	80	77
7 Chiba Jets	73	70

Semi-finals
1 Kawasaki Brave Thunders	84	77	26
4 Alvark Tokyo	76	78	18
2 Link Tochigi Brex	83	63	14
3 SeaHorses Mikawa	68	65	12

Final
1 Kawasaki Brave Thunders	79
2 Link Tochigi Brex	85

== B1 Relegation playoffs ==
Semi-finals
15 Toyama Grouses	67	82
18 Sendai 89ers	59	68
16 Akita Northern Happinets	55	65	16
17 Yokohama B-Corsairs	63	64	17

Final
15 Toyama Grouses	79
17 Yokohama B-Corsairs	71

B1B2 P/R final
17	Yokohama B-Corsairs	74
B2-4	Hiroshima Dragonflies	53

Sendai 89ers and Akita Happinets were relegated to B2.

== B1 Individual statistic leaders ==
Category	Player	Team	Statistic
Points per game	Nick Fazekas	Kawasaki Brave Thunders	27.1
Rebounds per game	Ryan Rossiter	Link Tochigi Brex	13.3
Assists per game	Naoki Uto	Toyama Grouses	4.3
Steals per game	Kenta Hirose	Hitachi SunRockers	2.0
Blocks per game	Josh Harrellson	Osaka Evessa	1.9
Turnovers per game	Julian Mavunga	Shiga Lakestars	3.3
Fouls per game	Marcus Dove	Kyoto Hannaryz	3.3
Minutes per game	Seiya Ando	Akita Northern Happinets	33.8
FT%	Kosuke Kanamaru	SeaHorses Mikawa	90.8%
3FG%	Kosuke Kanamaru	SeaHorses Mikawa	42.6%

== B2 Regular season ==
2016–17 B.League season

B2 Regular season
- Season MVP: Takumi Furuno

B2 Finals
- Champions: Nishinomiya Storks
- Runners-up: Shimane Susanoo Magic
- Finals MVP: Noriaki Dohara

Statistical leaders
- Points: Chehales Tapscott
- Rebounds: Solomon Alabi
- Assists: Takumi Furuno

Records
- Highest attendance: 4,899
- Lowest attendance: 223
- Attendance: 647,505
- Average attendance: 1,199

#	B2	W	L	PCT	GB	GP
1	Shimane Susanoo Magic	51	9	.850	—	60
2	Hiroshima Dragonflies	46	14	.767	5	60
3	Nishinomiya Storks	43	17	.717	8	60
4	Gunma Crane Thunders	40	20	.667	11	60
5	Kumamoto Volters	44	16	.733	7	60
6	Toyotsu Fighting Eagles Nagoya	42	18	.700	9	60
7	Cyberdyne Ibaraki Robots	32	28	.533	19	60
8	Fukushima Firebonds	30	30	.500	21	60
9	Ehime Orange Vikings	29	31	.483	22	60
10	Aomori Wat's	29	31	.483	22	60
11	Earthfriends Tokyo Z	27	33	.450	24	60
12	Passlab Yamagata Wyverns	26	34	.433	25	60
13	Bambitious Nara	24	36	.400	27	60
14	Tokyo Excellence	22	38	.367	29	60
15	Kagawa Five Arrows	19	41	.317	31	60
16	Iwate Big Bulls	15	45	.250	36	60
17	Shinshu Brave Warriors	14	46	.233	37	60
18	Kagoshima Rebnise	7	53	.117	44	60

== B2 Playoffs ==
Semi-finals
1 Shimane Susanoo Magic	60	52	11
4 Hiroshima Dragonflies	55	53	9
2 Nishinomiya Storks	68	70
3 Gunma Crane Thunders	59	60

Final
1 Shimane Susanoo Magic	53
2 Nishinomiya Storks	78

3rd place match
4	Hiroshima Dragonflies	78
3	Gunma Crane Thunders	65

Shimane Susanoo Magic and Nishinomiya Storks were promoted to B1. Tokyo Excellence and Kagoshima Rebnise were relegated to B3.

== B2 Individual statistic leaders ==
Category	Player	Team	Statistic
Points per game	Chehales Tapscott	Kagawa Five Arrows	19.5
Rebounds per game	Solomon Alabi	Toyotsu Fighting Eagles Nagoya	13.1
Assists per game	Takumi Furuno	Kumamoto Volters	5.1
Steals per game	Takumi Furuno	Kumamoto Volters	2.2
Blocks per game	Chukwudiebere Maduabum	Kagoshima Rebnise	2.4
Turnovers per game	Tatsuya Nishiyama	Tokyo Excellence	2.9
Fouls per game	Takumi Furuno	Kumamoto Volters	3.0
Minutes per game	Kazuto Sameshima	Kagoshima Rebnise	34.0
FT%	Masashi Obuchi	Gunma Crane Thunders	84.2%
3FG%	Edward Yamamoto	Shimane Susanoo Magic	45.3%

== B3 season ==
2016–17 B.League season

B3 Finals
- Champions: Rizing Zephyr Fukuoka
- Runners-up: Kanazawa Samuraiz

Statistical leaders
- Points: Kyle Richardson (basketball)
- Rebounds: Kyle Richardson (basketball)
- Assists: Kyohei Kumazawa

Records
- Highest attendance: 3,083
- Lowest attendance: 61

=== B3 First stage ===
#	B3 First Stage	W	L	PCT	GB	GP
1	Rizing Zephyr Fukuoka	9	1	.900	—	10
2	Tokyo Hachioji Trains	8	2	.800	1	10
3	Kanazawa Samuraiz	7	3	.700	2	10
4	Otsuka Corporation Alphas	4	6	.400	5	10
5	Tokyo Cinq Reves	1	9	.100	8	10
6	Saitama Broncos	1	9	.100	8	10

=== B3 Regular season ===
#	B3 Regular season	W	L	PCT	GB	GP
1	Kanazawa Samuraiz	29	3	.906	—	32
2	Rizing Zephyr Fukuoka	28	4	.875	1	32
3	Tokyo Hachioji Trains	21	11	.656	8	32
4	Otsuka Corporation Alphas	20	12	.625	9	32
5	Tokyo Cinq Reves	13	19	.406	16	32
6	Aisin AW Areions Anjo	13	19	.406	16	32
7	Saitama Broncos	12	20	.375	17	32
8	Toyoda Gosei Scorpions	5	27	.156	24	32
9	Tokio Marine Nichido Big Blue	3	29	.094	26	32

=== B3 Final stage ===
#	B3 Final Stage	W	L	PCT	GB	GP
1	Rizing Zephyr Fukuoka	9	1	.900	—	10
2	Kanazawa Samuraiz	8	2	.800	1	10
3	Tokyo Hachioji Trains	5	5	.500	4	10
4	Tokyo Cinq Reves	4	6	.400	5	10
5	Saitama Broncos	3	7	.300	6	10
6	Otsuka Corporation Alphas	1	9	.100	8	10

== B3 Individual statistic leaders ==
Category	Player	Team	Statistic
Points per game	Kyle Richardson (basketball)	Otsuka Corporation Alphas	19.344
Rebounds per game	Kyle Richardson (basketball)	Otsuka Corporation Alphas	10.875
Assists per game	Kyohei Kumazawa	Aisin AW Areions Anjo	3.969
Steals per game	Yusuke Ikeda	Tokyo Hachioji Trains	1.967
Blocks per game	Matthew Kendrick	Toyoda Gosei Scorpions	1.677
FT%	Kyohei Kumazawa	Aisin AW Areions Anjo	89.3%
3FG%	Masaya Ueda	Saitama Broncos	41.7%
