= Jucikas =

Jucikas is a surname. Notable people with the surname include:

- Julius Jucikas (born 1989), Lithuanian basketball player
- Matas Jucikas (born 1994), Lithuanian basketball player
