= Kikuo =

- Gender: Male

Origin
- Origin: Japanese
- Meaning: Different meanings depending on the kanji used

Kikuo (written: 喜久夫, 喜久雄, 喜久男 or 規矩雄) is a masculine Japanese given name. Notable people with the name include:

- Kikuo Arai (新井 規矩雄; born 1943), Japanese golfer
- Kikuo Chishima (千島 喜久男; 1899–1978), Japanese scientist
- Kikuo Takano (高野 喜久雄; 1927–2006), Japanese poet and mathematician
- Kikuo Wada (和田 喜久夫; 1951–2025), Japanese sport wrestler
- R. Kikuo Johnson (born 1981), American illustrator and cartoonist
- Kikuo (born 1988), a popular producer of Vocaloid music from Japan
