= Daichi Shimoyama =

Japanese basketball player

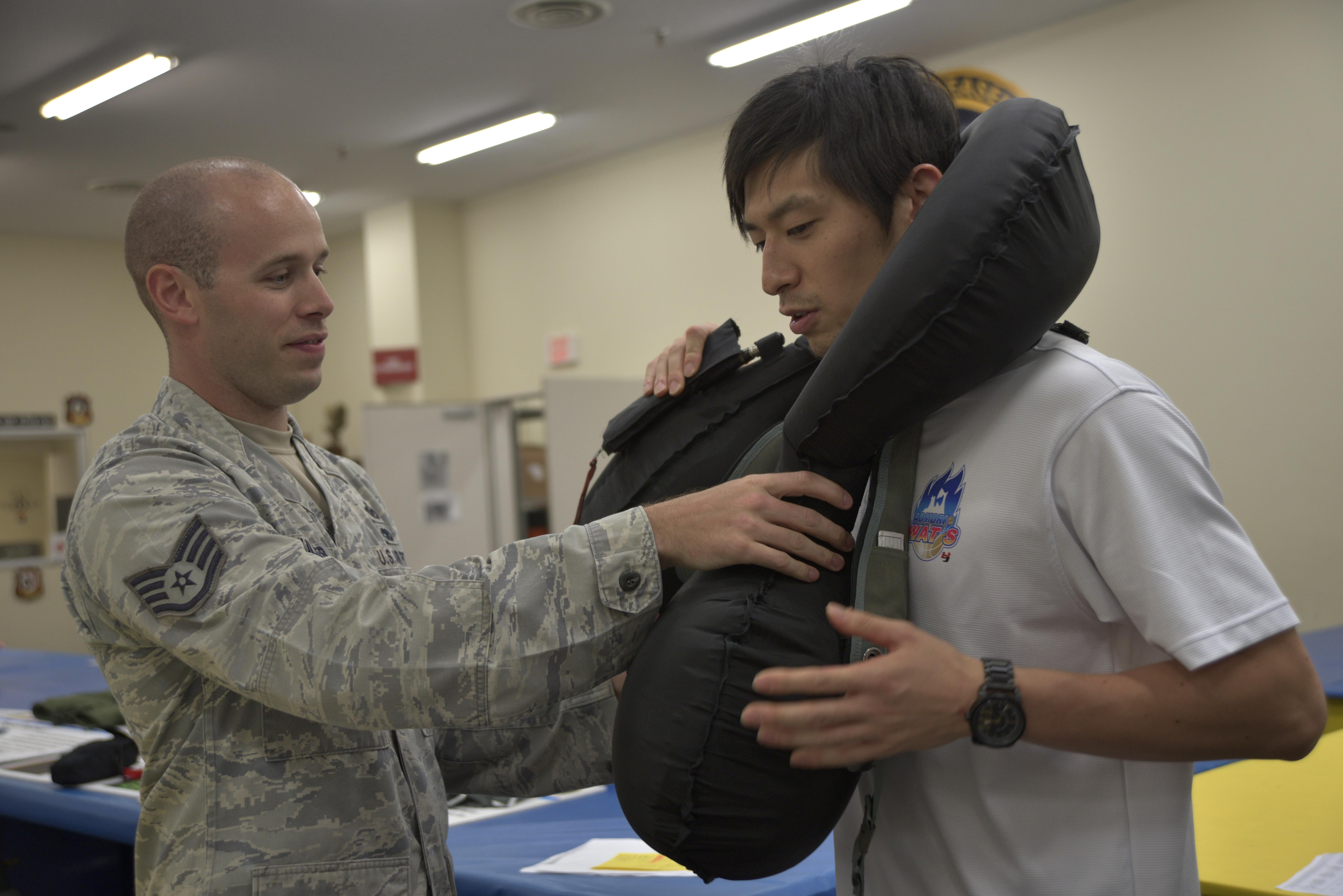
- Shimoyama at Misawa Air Base

No. 8 – Aomori Wat's
- Position: Shooting guard
- League: B.League

Personal information
- Born: August 8, 1989 (age 37) Goshogawara, Aomori, Japan
- Listed height: 6 ft 0 in (1.83 m)
- Listed weight: 168 lb (76 kg)

Career information
- High school: Hirosaki (Hirosaki, Aomori)
- College: Iwate University
- Playing career: 2012–present

Career history
- 2012: Tsuruta Club
- 2012-2013: Sendai 89ers
- 2013–2018: Aomori Wat's
- 2018–2019: Akita Northern Happinets
- 2019-present: Aomori Wat's

Daichi Shimoyama (下山 大地, Shimoyama Daichi; born August 8, 1989), nicknamed Chi, is a Japanese professional basketball player who plays for the Aomori Wat's of the B.League in Japan. He had been the team captain of the Aomori Wat's.

== College career ==
He's got Tohoku College Basketball League 3-point leader award in 2011.

== Career statistics ==
Legend
| GP | Games played | GS | Games started | MPG | Minutes per game |
| FG% | Field goal percentage | 3P% | 3-point field goal percentage | FT% | Free throw percentage |
| RPG | Rebounds per game | APG | Assists per game | SPG | Steals per game |
| BPG | Blocks per game | PPG | Points per game | **Bold** | Career high |

=== Regular season ===
| Year | Team | GP | GS | MPG | FG% | 3P% | FT% | RPG | APG | SPG | BPG | PPG |
|---|---|---|---|---|---|---|---|---|---|---|---|---|
| 2012-13 | Sendai | 18 | 0 | 2.3 | 27.3 | 0 | 75.0 | 0.3 | 0.1 | 0.2 | 0.1 | 0.5 |
| 2013-14 | Aomori | 34 | 0 | 4.6 | 25.7 | 27.9 | 70.0 | 0.3 | 0.1 | 0.1 | 0 | 1.7 |
| 2014-15 | Aomori | 25 | 0 | 4.7 | 26.4 | 16.7 | 71.4 | 0.4 | 0.2 | 0.1 | 0.0 | 2.0 |
| 2015-16 | Aomori | 51 | 11 | 19.2 | 39.7 | 40.0 | 56.7 | 1.7 | 0.5 | 0.5 | 0.1 | 7.6 |
| 2016-17 | Aomori | 56 | 56 | **33.5** | 40.2 | 37.1 | 60.3 | **2.9** | **0.9** | **0.6** | 0.1 | **10.9** |
| 2017-18 | Aomori | **60** | **60** | 28.8 | **41.8** | 38.2 | 71.4 | 2.2 | 0.8 | **0.6** | 0 | 10.4 |
| 2018-19 | Akita | 49 | 6 | 13.4 | 30.0 | 30.1 | 46.7 | 1.1 | 0.6 | 0.4 | 0.0 | 4.2 |
| 2019-20 | Aomori | 47 | 38 | 21.1 | 39.0 | **42.0** | **83.1** | 1.4 | 0.8 | **0.6** | 0.0 | 9.4 |

=== Playoffs ===
| Year | Team | GP | GS | MPG | FG% | 3P% | FT% | RPG | APG | SPG | BPG | PPG |
|---|---|---|---|---|---|---|---|---|---|---|---|---|
| 2015-16 | Aomori | 2 | | 6.00 | .143 | .000 | .000 | 00 | 1.0 | 0.5 | 0 | 1.0 |

=== Early cup games ===
| Year | Team | GP | GS | MPG | FG% | 3P% | FT% | RPG | APG | SPG | BPG | PPG |
|---|---|---|---|---|---|---|---|---|---|---|---|---|
| 2017 | Aomori | 2 | 2 | 26:09 | .556 | .200 | 1.000 | 2.0 | 2.0 | 1.5 | 0 | 11.5 |
| 2018 | Akita | 2 | 1 | 18:33 | .167 | .091 | .500 | 3.0 | 0.0 | 0.5 | 0 | 4.0 |
| 2019 | Aomori | 2 | 1 | 19:03 | .526 | .429 | .000 | 0.5 | 2.0 | 1.5 | 0 | 11.5 |

=== Preseason games ===
| Year | Team | GP | GS | MPG | FG% | 3P% | FT% | RPG | APG | SPG | BPG | PPG |
|---|---|---|---|---|---|---|---|---|---|---|---|---|
| 2018 | Akita | 2 | 1 | 15.1 | .333 | .333 | .333 | 1.0 | 1.5 | 0.5 | 0.0 | 6.0 |

Source: Changwon1Changwon2

== Gallery ==
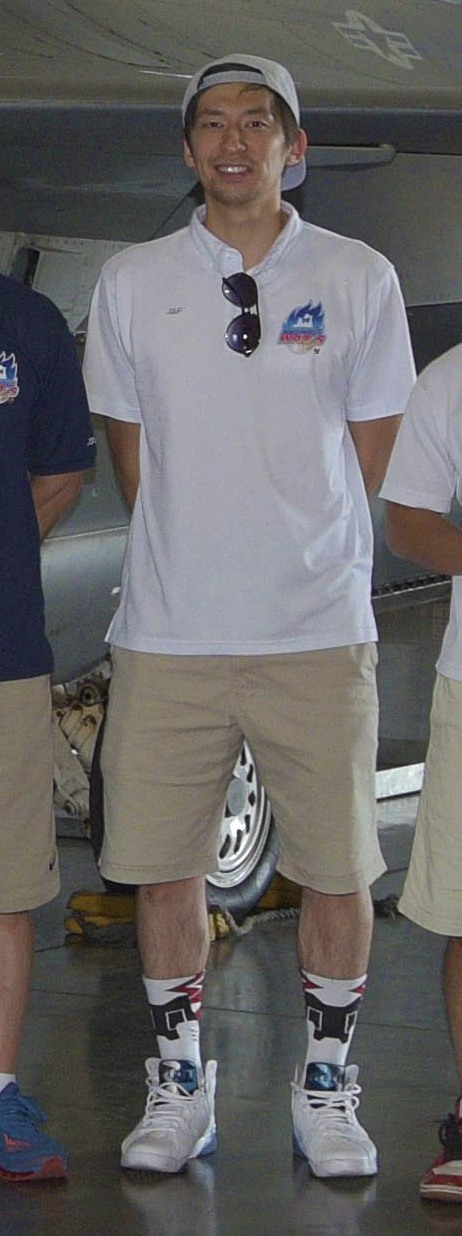

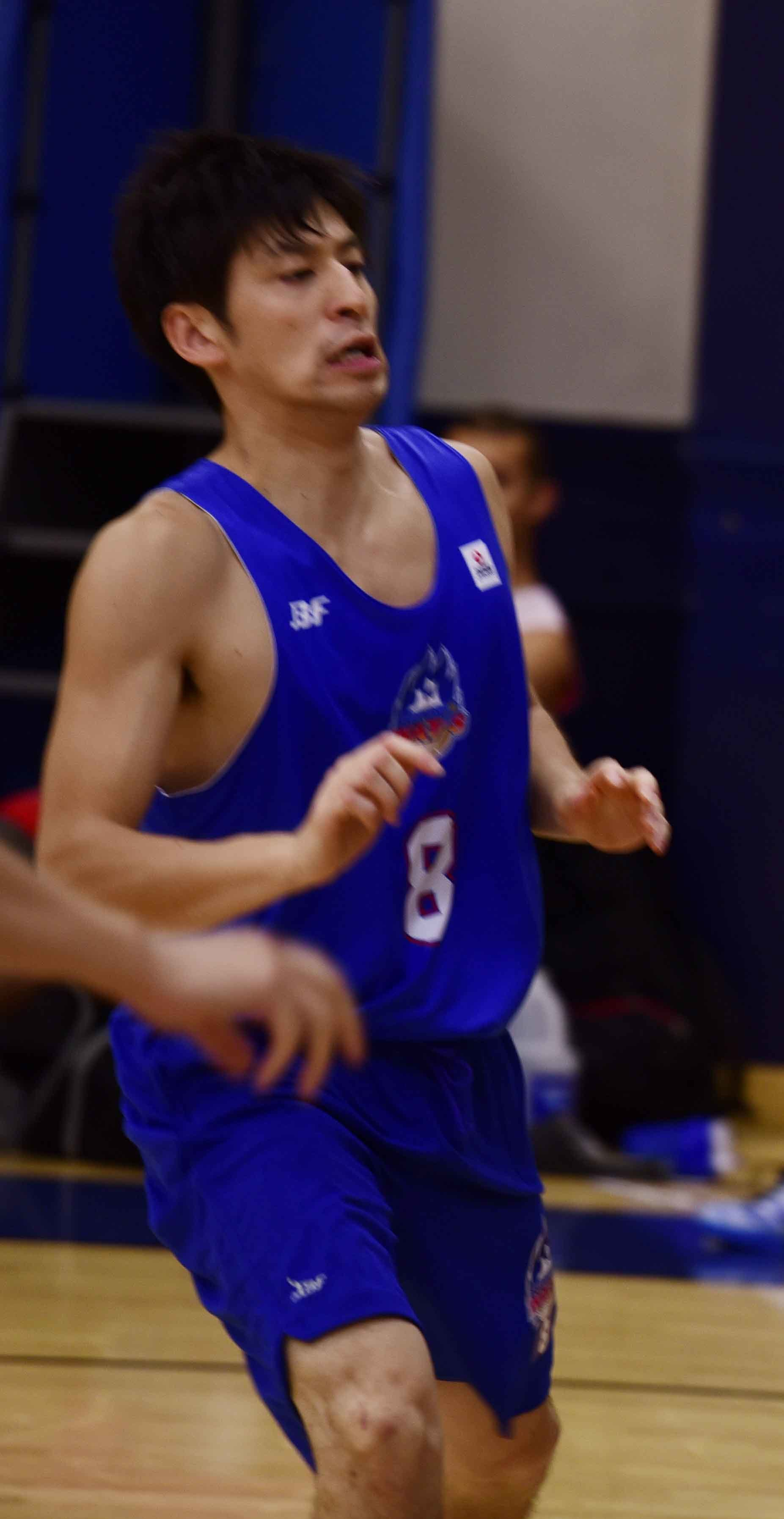

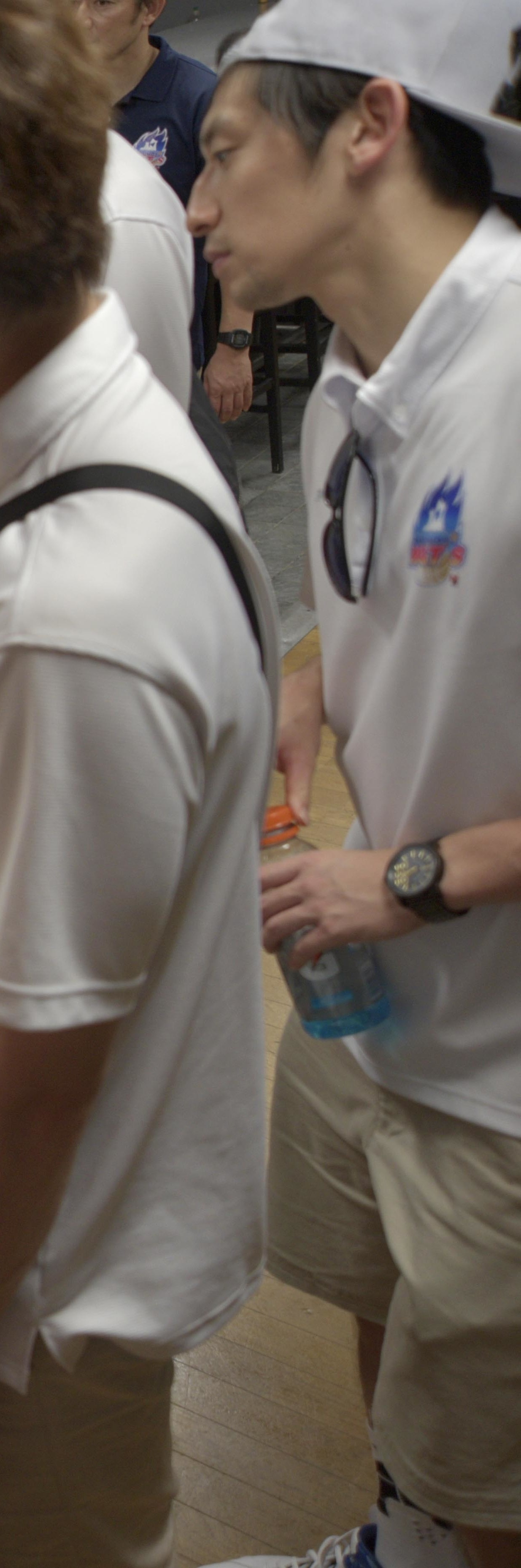
