= Kyle Richardson (basketball) =

American basketball player (born 1991)

No. 34 – Yokohama B-Corsairs
- Position: Power forward
- League: B.League

Personal information
- Born: April 17, 1991 (age 35) Lakewood, California, U.S.
- Listed height: 6 ft 7 in (2.01 m)
- Listed weight: 235 lb (107 kg)

Career information
- High school: Mayfair (Lakewood, California)
- College: Long Beach State (2009–2013); Portland State (2013–2014)
- NBA draft: 2014: undrafted
- Playing career: 2014–present

Career history
- 2014–2015: Aomori Wat's
- 2015–2016: Earthfriends Tokyo Z
- 2016–2017: Otsuka Corporation Alphas
- 2017: Link Tochigi Brex
- 2017–2019: Otsuka Corporation Alphas
- 2019–2021: Aisin AW Areions Anjo
- 2021–2022: Iwate Big Bulls
- 2022–2023: Kagawa Five Arrows
- 2023–2025: Kagoshima Rebnise
- 2025: Koshigaya Alphas
- 2025–2026: Nagoya Diamond Dolphins
- 2026–present: Yokohama B-Corsairs

Career highlights
- B3 Scoring leader (2016-17); B3 Rebound leader (2016-17)

Kyle Bassc Richardson (born April 17, 1991) is an American-Japanese professional basketball player for the Yokohama B-Corsairs of the Japanese B.League. He played college basketball for the Long Beach State 49ers and Portland State Vikings.

== Professional career ==
On May 26, 2023, Richardson signed with Kagoshima Rebnise of the Japanese B.League.

On January 24, 2025, Richardson parted ways with Kagoshima Rebnise, signed with Koshigaya Alphas as naturalised player. On May 28, he signed with Nagoya Diamond Dolphins.
