= Erik McCree =

American basketball player (born 1993)

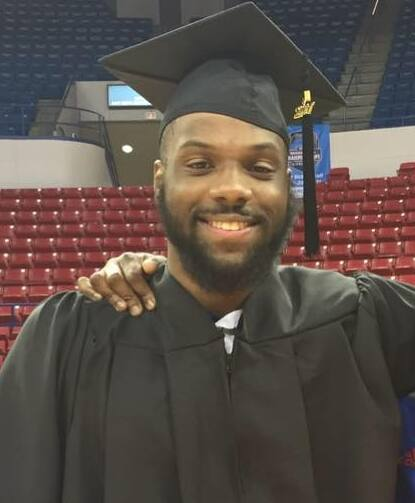
- McCree in 2017

Gifu Swoops
- Position: Small forward / power forward
- League: B.League

Personal information
- Born: December 20, 1993 (age 32) Orlando, Florida, U.S.
- Listed height: 6 ft 7 in (2.01 m)
- Listed weight: 228 lb (103 kg)

Career information
- High school: West Orange (Winter Garden, Florida)
- College: Murray State (2012–2013); Louisiana Tech (2014–2017)
- NBA draft: 2017: undrafted
- Playing career: 2017–present

Career history
- 2017: Sioux Falls Skyforce
- 2017–2018: Utah Jazz
- 2017–2018: → Salt Lake City Stars
- 2018–2019: VL Pesaro
- 2019–2020: BCM Gravelines-Dunkerque
- 2020: Bakken Bears
- 2020–2021: BCM Gravelines-Dunkerque
- 2021–2022: Peristeri
- 2022: Gaziantep Basketbol
- 2023: Magnolia Hotshots
- 2023: Broncos de Caracas
- 2023–2024: Taipei Mars
- 2024: Soles de Mexicali
- 2024–2025: Al Nassr
- 2025: Leones de Ponce
- 2025–2026: Minas
- 2026–present: Gifu Swoops

Career highlights
- First-team All-Conference USA (2017); Second-team All-Conference USA (2016)
- Stats at NBA.com
- Stats at Basketball Reference

Erik Deshawn McCree Robinson (born December 20, 1993) is an American professional basketball player for Gifu Swoops of the Japanese B.League. He played college basketball for Murray State and Louisiana Tech.

== College career ==
McCree had previously been a part of Murray State University under his freshman year of college before transferring to Louisiana Tech University in 2013. In his junior year of college, he made it to the All-Conference USA Second Team, while he would improve to the All-Conference USA First Team in his senior year.

== Professional career ==
=== Sioux Falls Skyforce (2017) ===
After finishing his last four years of college from 2014 to 2017, he would end up being undrafted in the 2017 NBA draft. McCree would end up being a part of the Houston Rockets's Summer League squad for the 2017 NBA Summer League, eventually signing with the Miami Heat for their training camp squad. He would ultimately be waived from the Heat before the regular season began but would be assigned to the Sioux Falls Skyforce afterward. He would continue playing for them until December 21, 2017, one day after his 24th birthday.

=== Utah Jazz (2017–2018) ===
On December 21, 2017, McCree signed a two-way contract with the Utah Jazz, replacing Eric Griffin's spot on the team. Throughout the rest of the season, McCree would end up splitting his playing time between the Jazz and their NBA G League affiliate, the Salt Lake City Stars. McCree would make his official NBA debut on February 5, 2018, playing at around 2 minutes in a 133–109 blowout win over the New Orleans Pelicans.

=== VL Pesaro (2018–2019) ===
On August 1, 2018, McCree signed a deal with the Italian club VL Pesaro.

=== BCM Gravelines-Dunkerque (2019–2020) ===
On July 26, 2019, he has signed with BCM Gravelines-Dunkerque of the French LNB Pro A.

=== Bakkan Bears (2020) ===
On October 6, 2020, he signed with Bakken Bears of Basketligaen.

=== BCM Gravelines-Dunkerque (2020–2021) ===
On October 28, 2020, McCree returned to BCM Gravelines-Dunkerque after playing in two games with the Bakken Bears, signing with the team for the rest of the 2020–2021 season. He averaged 13.8 points, 6.7 rebounds, 3.4 assists and 1.0 steal per game.

=== Peristeri (2021–2022) ===
On July 28, 2021, McCree signed with Peristeri of the Greek Basket League and the Basketball Champions League. He averaged 10.2 points, 4.5 rebounds, and 1.3 assists per game. On January 5, 2022, McCree left the team.

=== Gaziantep Basketbol (2022) ===
On January 14, 2022, McCree signed with Gaziantep Basketbol of the Basketbol Süper Ligi.

On June 17, 2022, McCree signed with Shiga Lakestars of the B.League. On September 3, his contract was terminated due to poor condition.

=== Magnolia Hotshots (2023) ===
In December 2022, he signed with the Magnolia Hotshots of the Philippine Basketball Association (PBA) as the team's import for the 2023 PBA Governors' Cup. After playing three games, he was replaced by Antonio Hester.

=== Taipei Mars (2023–2024) ===
On September 14, 2023, McCree joined the Taipei Taishin Mars of the T1 League. On February 6, 2024, his contract was terminated.

=== Al Nassr (2024–2025) ===
On November 21, 2024, McCree joined the Al Nassr of the Saudi Basketball League.

== NBA career statistics ==
Legend
GP	Games played	GS	Games started	MPG	Minutes per game
FG%	Field goal percentage	3P%	3-point field goal percentage	FT%	Free throw percentage
RPG	Rebounds per game	APG	Assists per game	SPG	Steals per game
BPG	Blocks per game	PPG	Points per game	**Bold**	Career high

=== Regular season ===
Year	Team	GP	GS	MPG	FG%	3P%	FT%	RPG	APG	SPG	BPG	PPG
2017–18	Utah	4	0	2.0	.000	.000	–	.3	.0	.3	.0	.0
Career		4	0	2.0	.000	.000	–	.3	.0	.3	.0	.0
