= Iwate University =

Higher education institution in Iwate Prefecture, Japan

- 岩手大学
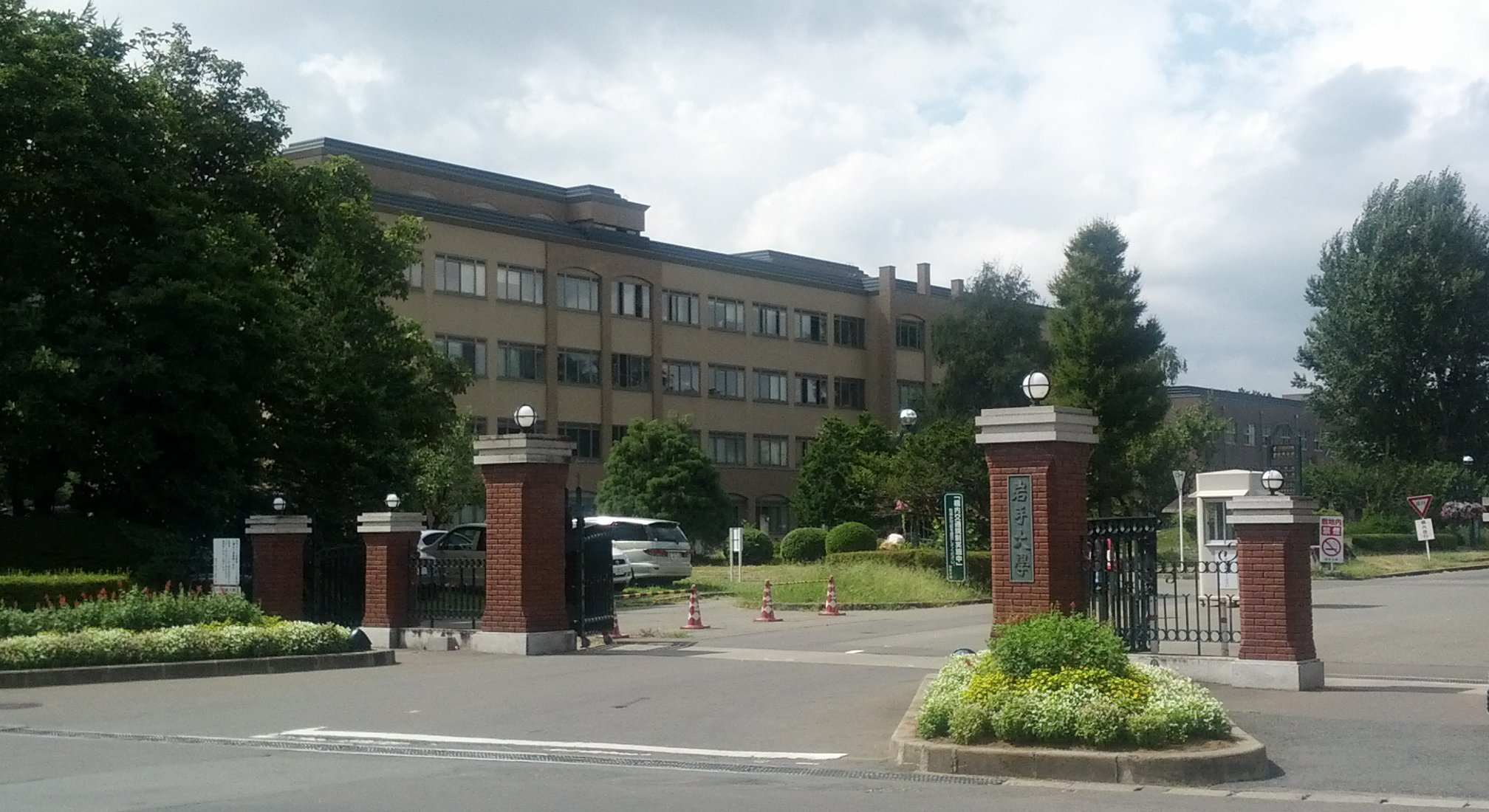
- Main Gate of Iwate University
- Type: National
- Established: 1949; 77 years ago
- President: Yoshio Yamamoto
- Faculty: 363（May 2021）
- Administrative staff: 185（May 2021）
- Undergraduates: 4592（May 2021）
- Postgraduates: 775（May 2021）
- Doctoral students: 174（May 2021）
- Other students: 134 international students, 41 research students and auditors
- Location: Morioka, Iwate Prefecture, Japan; 39°42′54″N 141°08′16″E
- Campus: Morioka, Iwate (main) Kamaishi, Iwate
- Colors: Green
- Nickname: がんだい (Gandai)
- Website: www.iwate-u.ac.jp

Iwate University (Japanese: 岩手大学, Iwate Daigaku, abbreviated as Gandai or 岩大) is a national university located in Morioka, Japan. Founded in 1876 as the Morioka Shihan Gakkō (盛岡師範学校), the school was formally established as Iwate University in 1949.

With its main campus located in Morioka, and another in Kamaishi, Iwate, it has several research institutes at cities in the Sanriku region to support the reconstruction of the fishing industry due to the 2011 Tōhoku Earthquake. These are under the jurisdiction of the Iwate University Sanriku Reconstruction and Regional Revitalization Promotion Organization.

== History ==
Originating in 1876 as the Morioka Shihan Gakkō (盛岡師範学校), the school was formally established as Iwate University in 1949 under the new educational system, by integrating Iwate Prefectural Training Center for Supplementary Vocational School Teachers, Morioka Higher Technical School and Morioka Imperial College of Agriculture and Forestry. Three faculties were established: Faculty of Arts and Sciences, Faculty of Engineering and Faculty of Agriculture.

In April 1954, the General Education Department was established. Reformation of general liberal arts education began in May 1977. The Faculty of Humanities and Social Sciences was later established. Iwate University was incorporated as a national university in April 2004.

In December 2015, Iwate University established the "Iwate University Ihatov Fund" in order to enhance education and research as well as to further promote study support for students. The fund consists of the "General Fund" for broad-ranging support of the university's education, research and student body, and the "Special Fund" for exclusively helping students affected by the Great East Japan Earthquake to complete their studies.

== Administration ==
=== Undergraduate programs ===
- Faculty of Humanities and Social Sciences
- Faculty of Education
- Faculty of Science and Engineering
- Faculty of Agriculture

=== Graduate programs ===
- Graduate School of Arts and Sciences
- Graduate School of Education
- Graduate School of Science and Engineering
- Graduate School of Veterinary Sciences
- United Graduate School of Agricultural Sciences (UGAS)

=== Research facilities ===
- Research Center for Regional Disaster Management
- Center for Hiraizumi Studies
- Sanriku Fisheries Research Center
- Research Center for Manufacturing Technology
- Agri-Innovation Center

== Notable people ==
=== Alumni ===
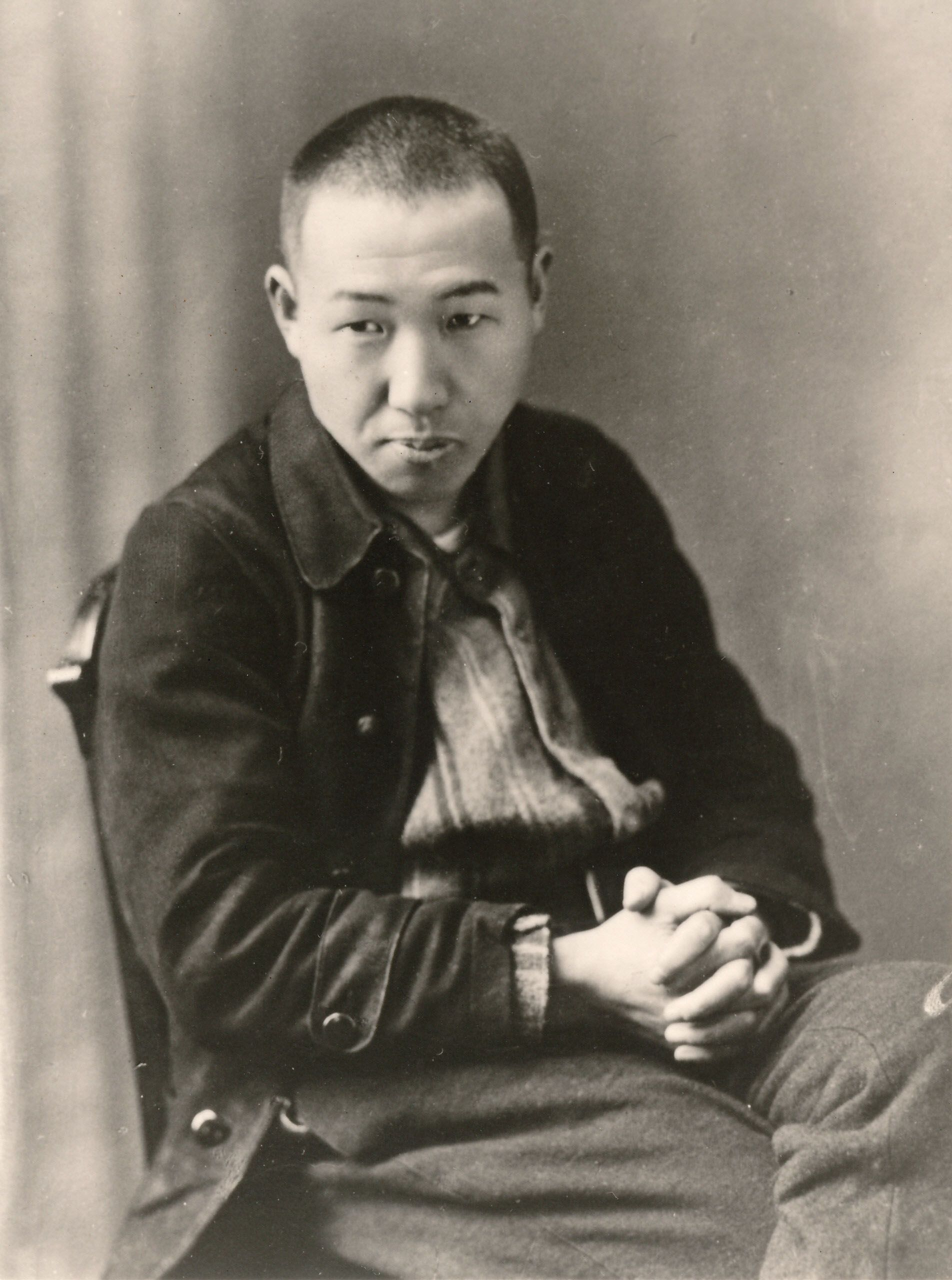
Kenji Miyazawa

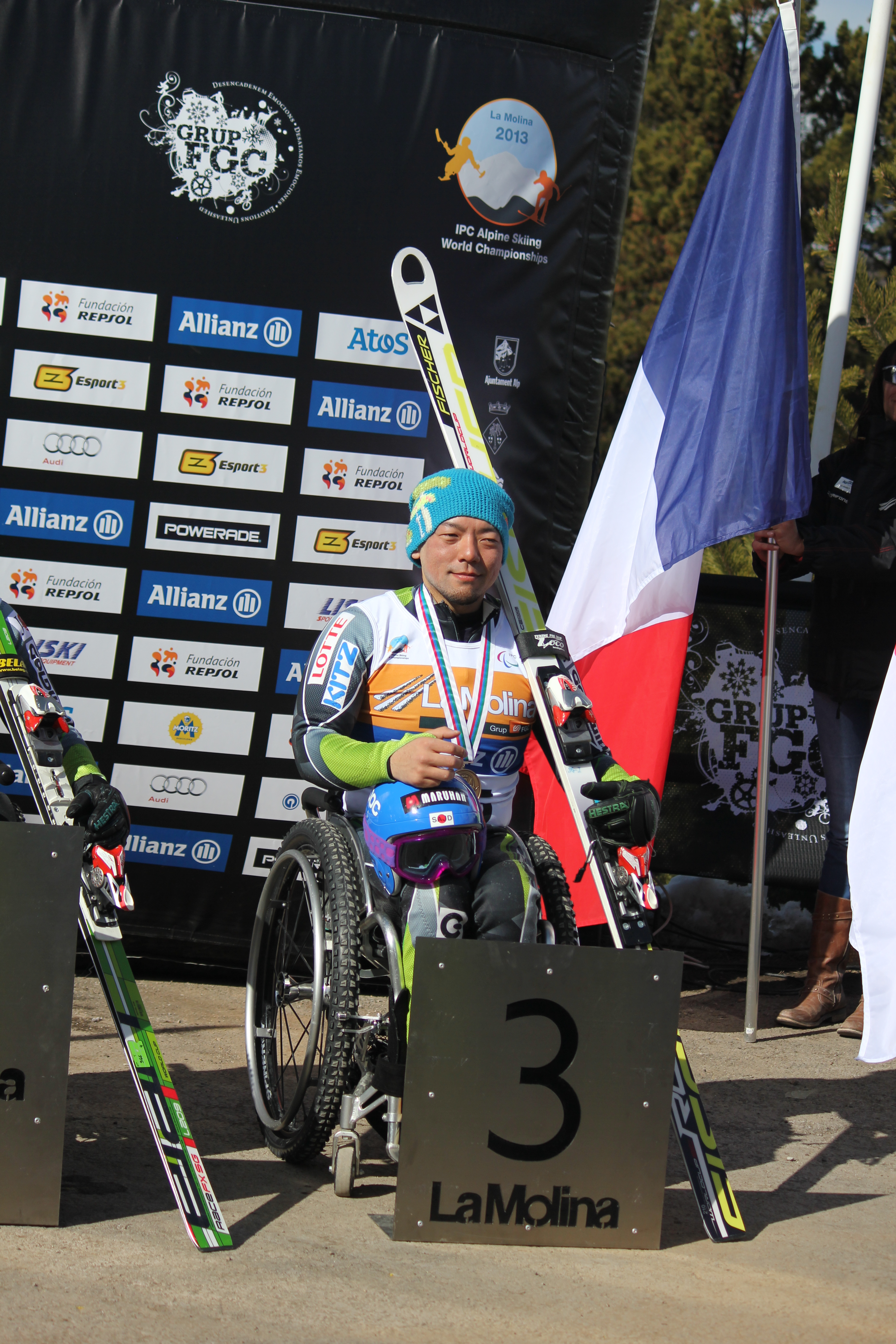
Akira Kano

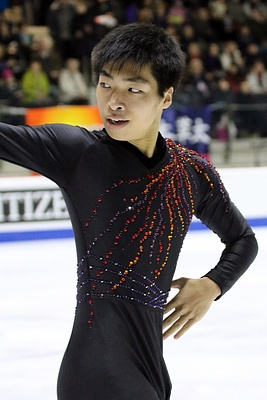
Hiroaki Sato

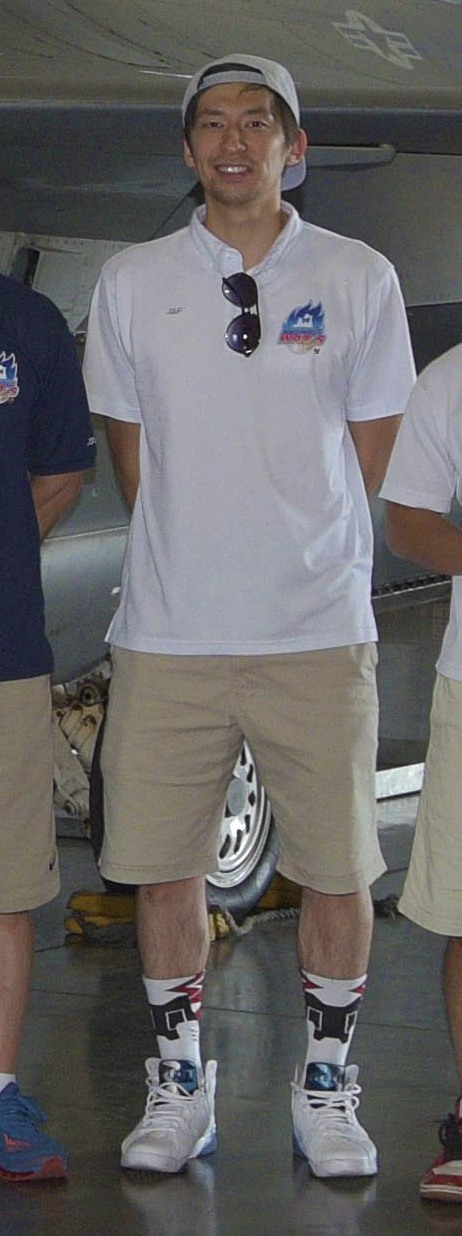
Daichi Shimoyama
- Chisako Wakatake (writer) - Akutagawa Prize winning author
- Kenji Miyazawa (poet) - graduated from Morioka Agriculture and Forestry College (盛岡高等農林学校, Morioka Kōtō Nōrin Gakkō, now the Faculty of Agriculture)
- Naoki Naruo (footballer) - former football player and manager
- Akira Kano (alpine skier) - Paralympic Champion, winner of three Paralympic gold medals
- Hiroaki Sato (figure skating)
- Daichi Shimoyama (basketball player)
- Eiki Takahashi (racewalker)
- Kikuo Chishima (medical researcher)
- Motoo Fujii (table tennis player)

== Historical Museum for Agricultural Education ==
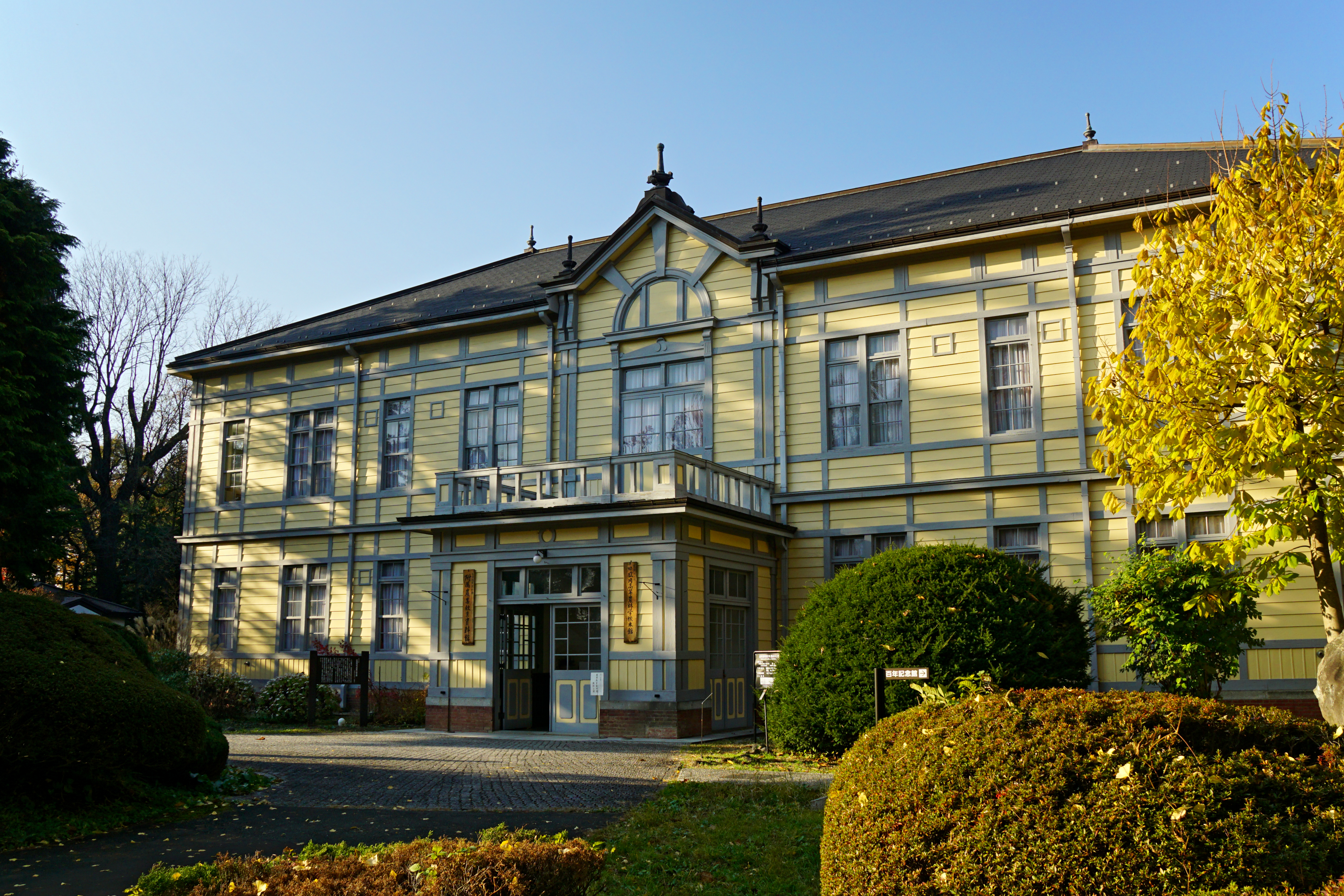
Historical Museum for Agricultural Education

Formerly the Morioka Agricultural High School, the Historical Museum for Agricultural Education is located within the Iwate University Campus. Constructed in 1912 and completed in December of the same year, the Historical Museum for Agricultural Education is one of the few buildings still surviving as a central facility of a national professional college established in the Meiji era. It has been preserved well with little alteration and was designated as an Important Cultural Property on July 12, 1994. The Guardroom and Old Main Gate were also given the same designation at the same time. A large-scale renovation took place around that time and the Historical Museum was restored to its original state. Polan Plaza, which houses a sundial, was built to the northeast of the Hall in the corner that connects to the Faculty of Agriculture building.

== Gallery ==
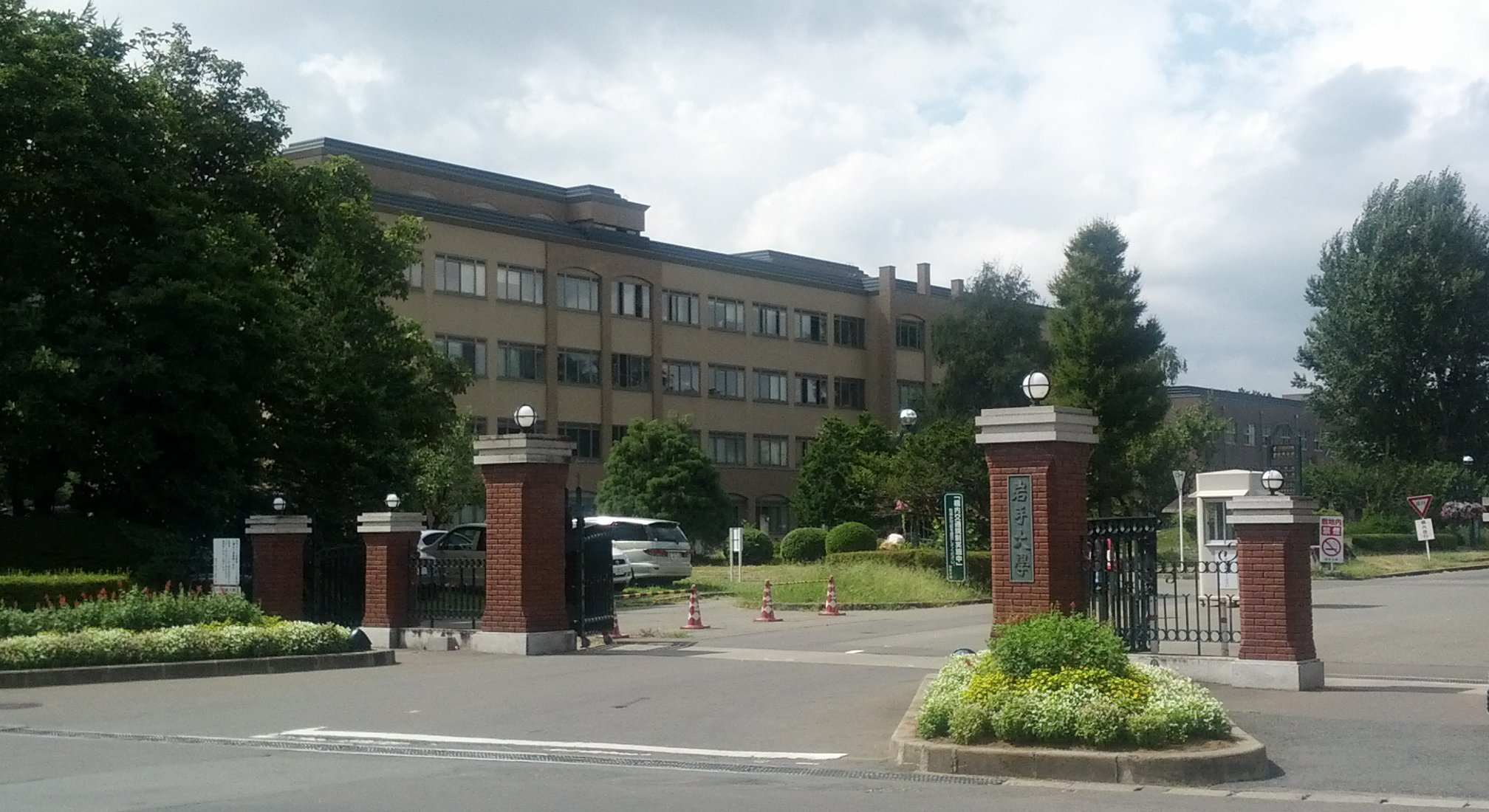
Main Gate

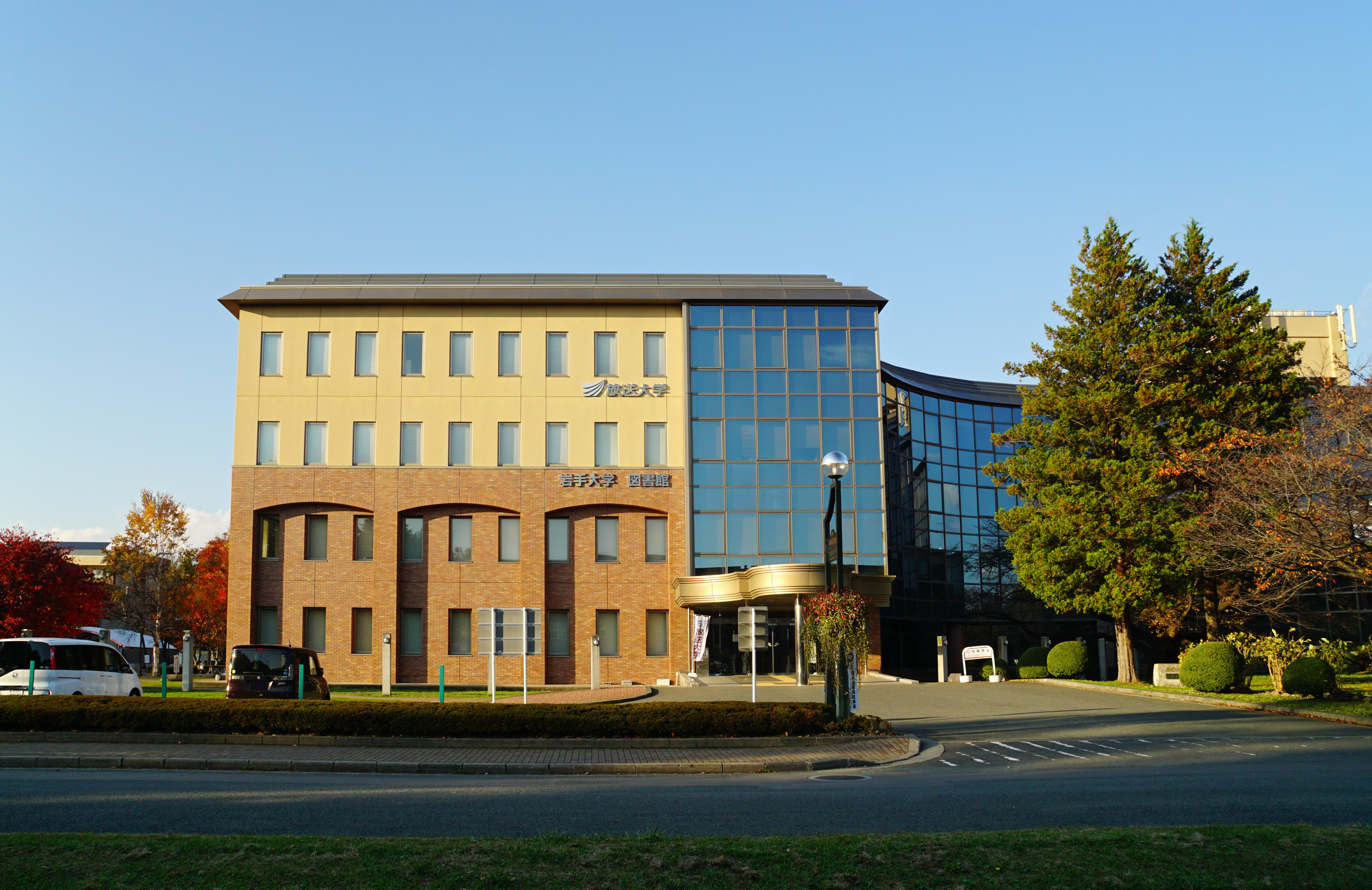
Iwate University Library

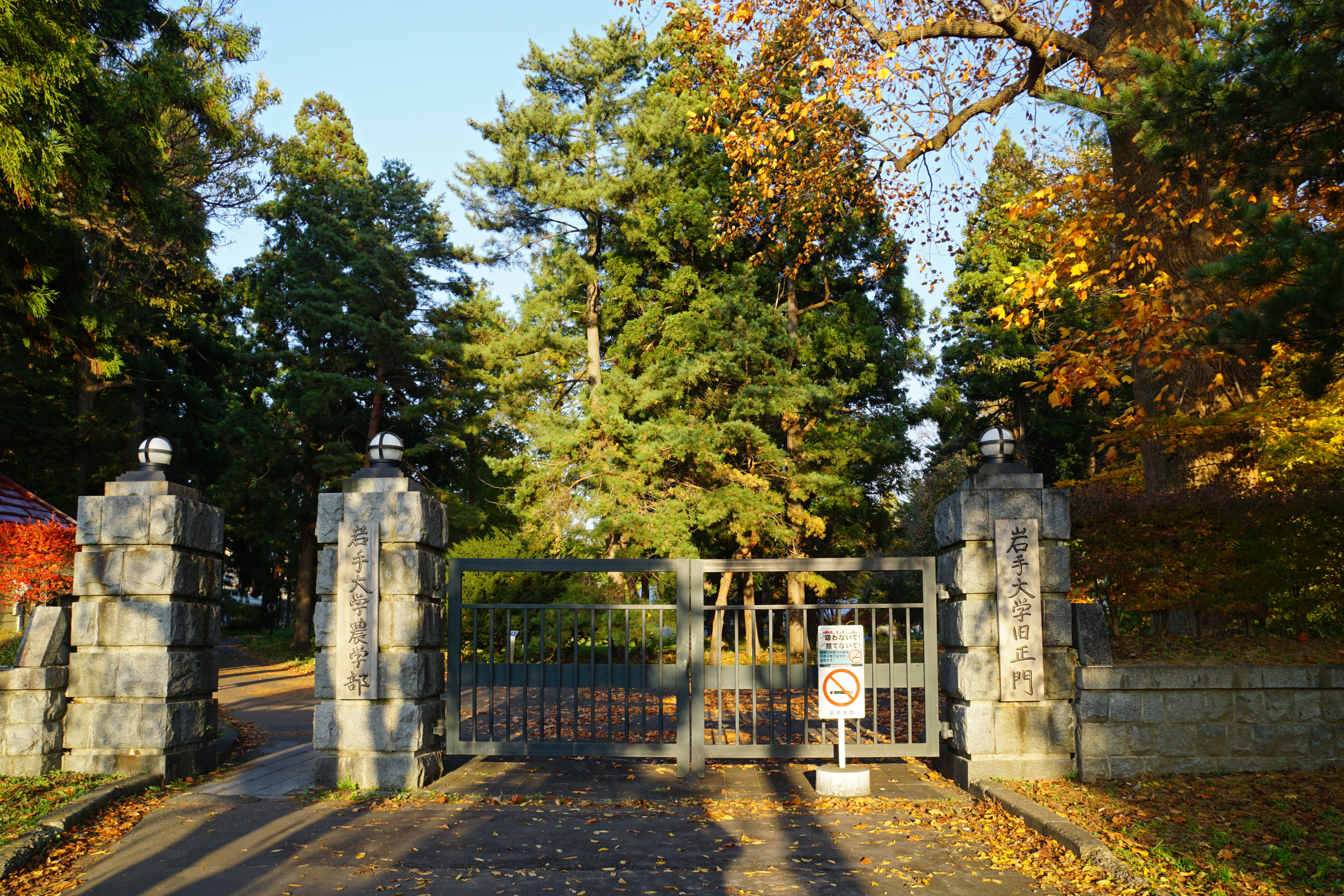
Old Main Gate

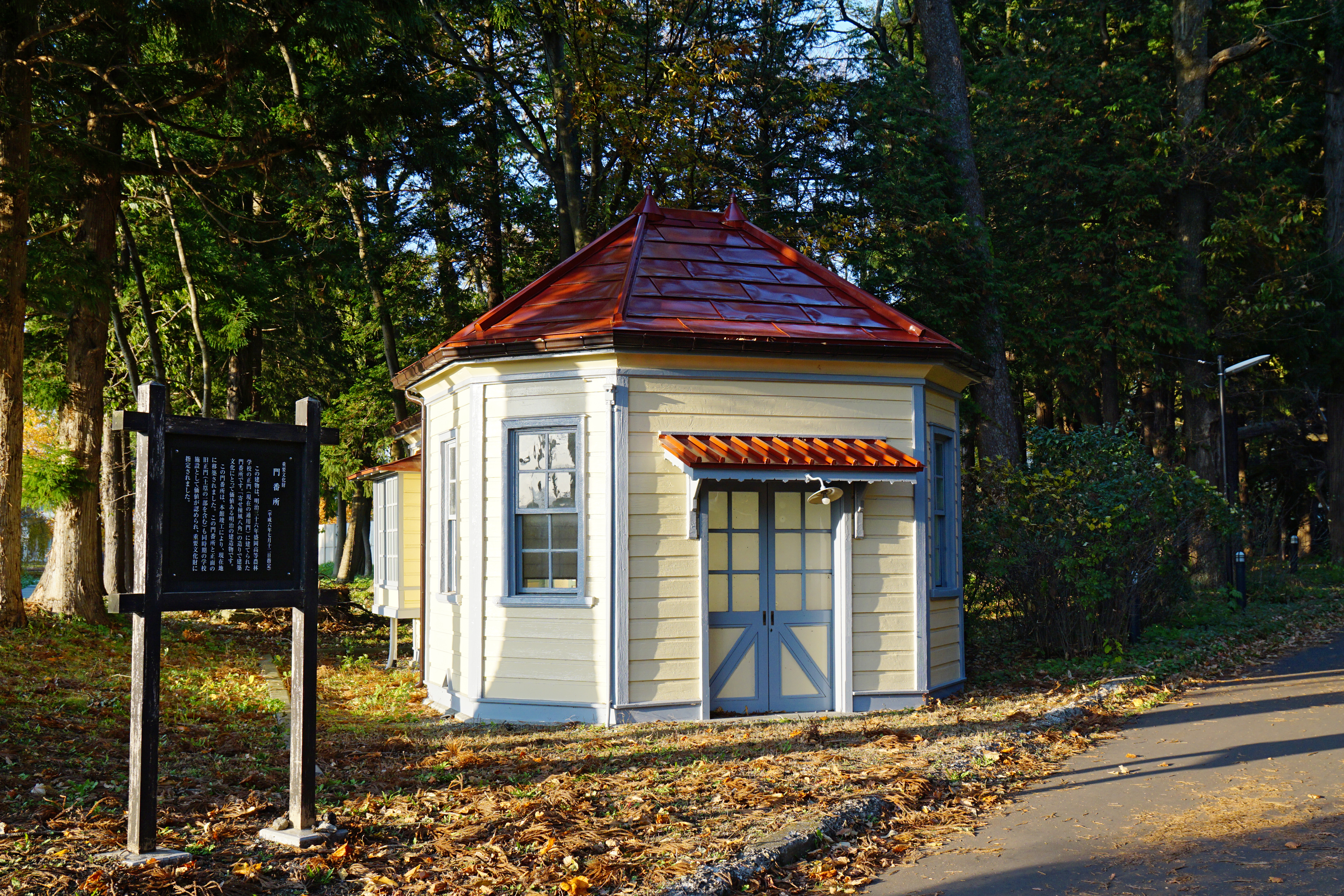
Guardroom
