= Misawa International Sports Center =

Arena in Misawa, Aomori, Japan

Coordinates: 40°40′52″N 141°23′57.7″E

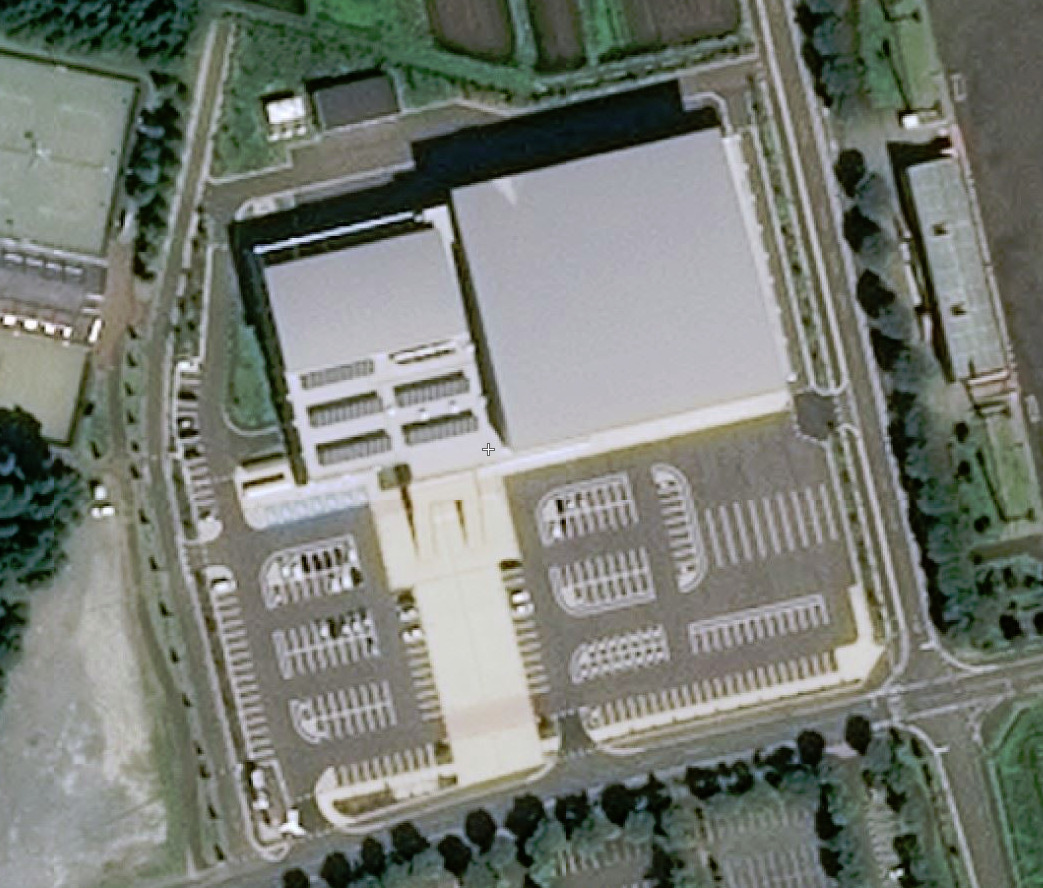

- Location within Aomori Prefecture Location within Japan
- Interactive map of Misawa International Sports Center
- Full name: Misawa International Sports Center
- Location: Misawa, Aomori, Japan
- Owner: Misawa city
- Operator: Misawa city
- Capacity: 1,808

Construction
- Opened: October 2017
- Cost: JPY 3,613 million
- Architect: Aoken Sekkei

Misawa International Sports Center is an arena in Misawa, Aomori, Japan.

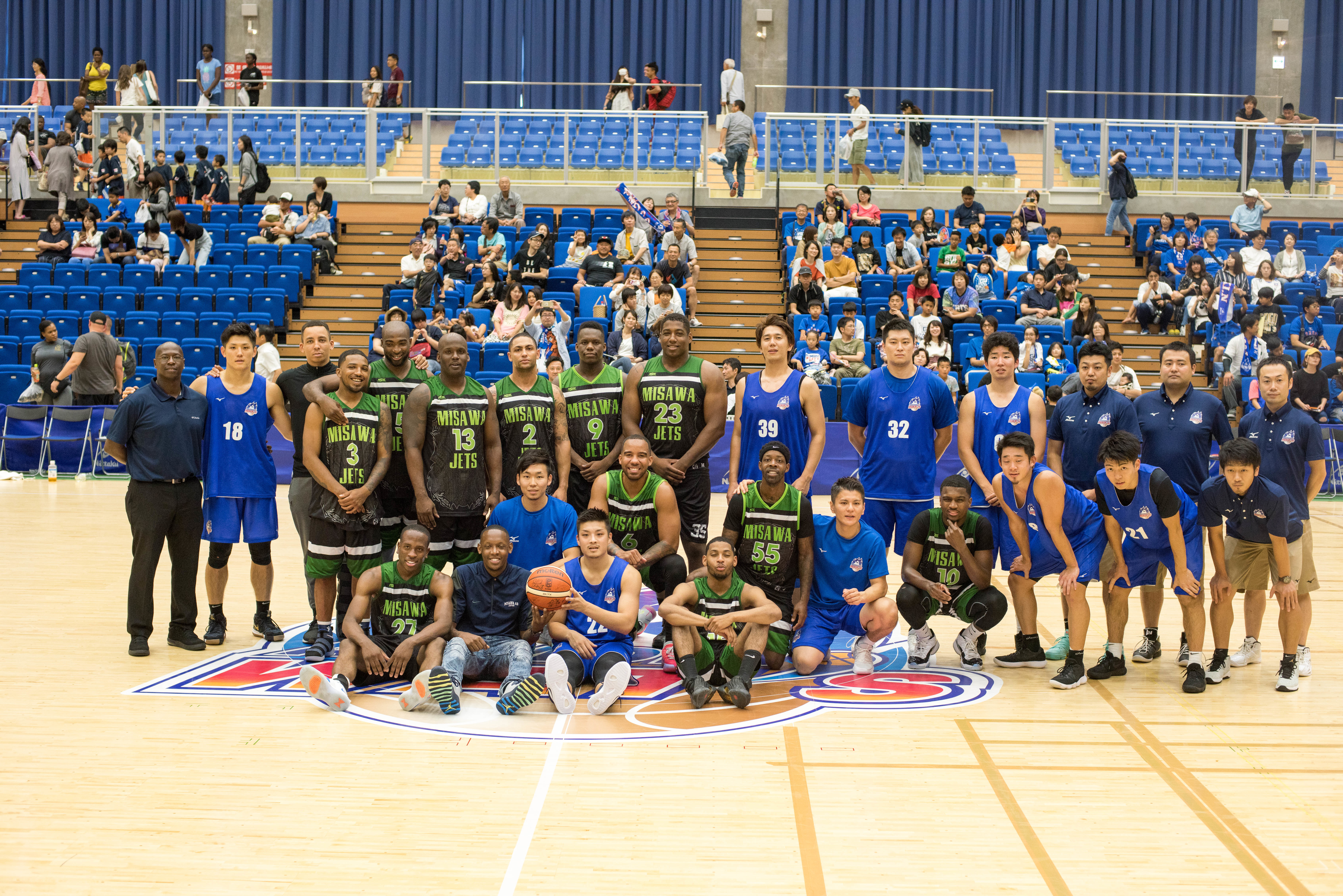
Misawa Jets vs. Aomori Wat's at Sports Center

== Facilities ==
- Main arena - 2,080m^{2}（52.0m×40.0m）
- Sub arena - 745.76m^{2}（37.288m×20.0m）
- Training room
- Running course - 200m
