= Lakeem Jackson =

American basketball player (born 1990)

Free agent
- Position: Small forward

Personal information
- Born: August 10, 1990 (age 36) Charlotte, North Carolina
- Listed height: 6 ft 5 in (1.96 m)
- Listed weight: 235 lb (107 kg)

Career information
- High school: Christ School (Arden, North Carolina)
- College: South Carolina (2009–2013)
- NBA draft: 2013: undrafted
- Playing career: 2013–present

Career history
- 2013–2014: Iskra Svit
- 2015: RheinStars Köln
- 2016: ETB Wohnbau Baskets
- 2016–2017: Busan KT Sonicboom
- 2017–2018: Aomori Wat's
- 2018–2019: Ehime Orange Vikings
- 2019–2020: Aomori Wat's
- 2020–2021: Bambitious Nara
- 2021–2022: Aomori Wat's

Career highlights
- 2× Slovak Cup champion (2013, 2014)

Lakeem "Keem" Jackson (born August 10, 1990) is an American professional basketball player for Aomori Wat's of the Japanese B.League. At a weight of 235 lbs and a height of 196 cm (6'5), he plays the small forward position.

== High school ==
Jackson attended Christ School (North Carolina), in Arden, North Carolina, where he also played high school basketball.

== College career ==
Jackson played college basketball at the University of South Carolina (NCAA Division I), where he played with the South Carolina Gamecocks.

== Professional career ==
On August 13, 2013, Jackson signed his first professional contract with Slovak Extraliga club BK Iskra Svit. During this season he won the Slovak cup finals and made a run for the league championship, but would soon fall in the semi-finals to club BC Prievidza.

On July 20, 2014, Jackson signed a contract extension with BK Iskra Svit.

On June 25, 2015, Jackson signed his third professional contract with his second club RheinStars Köln of the ProA which is the second-tier level.

On October 15, 2016, Jackson signed his fourth professional contract with his third club ETB Wohnbau Baskets in the ProA of Germany. On December 31, 2016, he parted ways with ETB and signed his fifth professional contract with Korean Basketball League club Busan KT Sonicboom

Jackson played for Bambitious Nara of the B.League.during the 2020–21 season, averaging 14.2 points, 6.9 rebounds, 3.1 assists and 1.1 steals per game. On December 10, 2021, he signed with Aomori Wat's.

== Career statistics ==
=== Domestic leagues ===
Season	Team	League	GP	MPG	FG%	3P%	FT%	RPG	APG	SPG	BPG	PPG
2013–2014	BK Iskra Svit	SBL	39	28.4	.560	.000	.500	6.5	2.1	.3	1.0	14.5
2014–2015	BK Iskra Svit	SBL	31	33.1	.580	.200	.560	8.9	2.4	2.0	1.0	18.4
2015–2016	RheinStars Köln	ProA	30	31.6	.470	.200	.500	7.2	2.2	1.0	1.0	12.6
2016–2017	ETB Wohnbau Baskets	ProA	9	21.9	.500	.000	.518	4.9	1.7	1.0	1.0	7.2
