= Toshihide Sameshima =

Japanese basketball coach

Toshihide Sameshima 鮫島俊秀
Personal information
- Born: June 2, 1955 (age 71) Kagoshima, Kagoshima

Career information
- College: Kyushu University (-1978)
- Position: Head coach

Career history

Coaching
- 2008-2012: Renova Kagoshima
- 2015-2017: Renova Kagoshima/Kogoshima Rebnise
- 2018-2019: Kagoshima Rebnise

Toshihide Sameshima (鮫島俊秀, Sameshima Toshihide) is the former head coach of the Kagoshima Rebnise in the Japanese B.League.

== Head coaching record ==
Legend
Regular season	G	Games coached	W	Games won	L	Games lost	W–L %	Win–loss %
Playoffs	PG	Playoff games	PW	Playoff wins	PL	Playoff losses	PW–L %	Playoff win–loss %

Team	Year	G	W	L	W–L%	Finish	PG	PW	PL	PW–L%	Result
Renova Kagoshima	2008-09	14	3	11	.214	7th in JBL2	-	-	-	–	-
Renova Kagoshima	2009-10	21	6	15	.286	6th in JBL2	-	-	-	–	-
Renova Kagoshima	2010-11	23	11	12	.478	4th in JBL2	-	-	-	–	-
Renova Kagoshima	2011-12	27	18	9	.667	3rd in JBL2	2	0	2	.000	4th in JBL2
Renova Kagoshima	2015-16	36	6	30	.167	9th in NBDL	-	-	-	–	-
Kagoshima Rebnise	2016-17	60	7	53	.117	6th in B2 Western	-	-	-	–	relegated to B3
