= OKB Gifu Seiryu Arena =

Arena at Gifu, Japan

Coordinates: 35°23′29.74″N 136°43′32.33″E

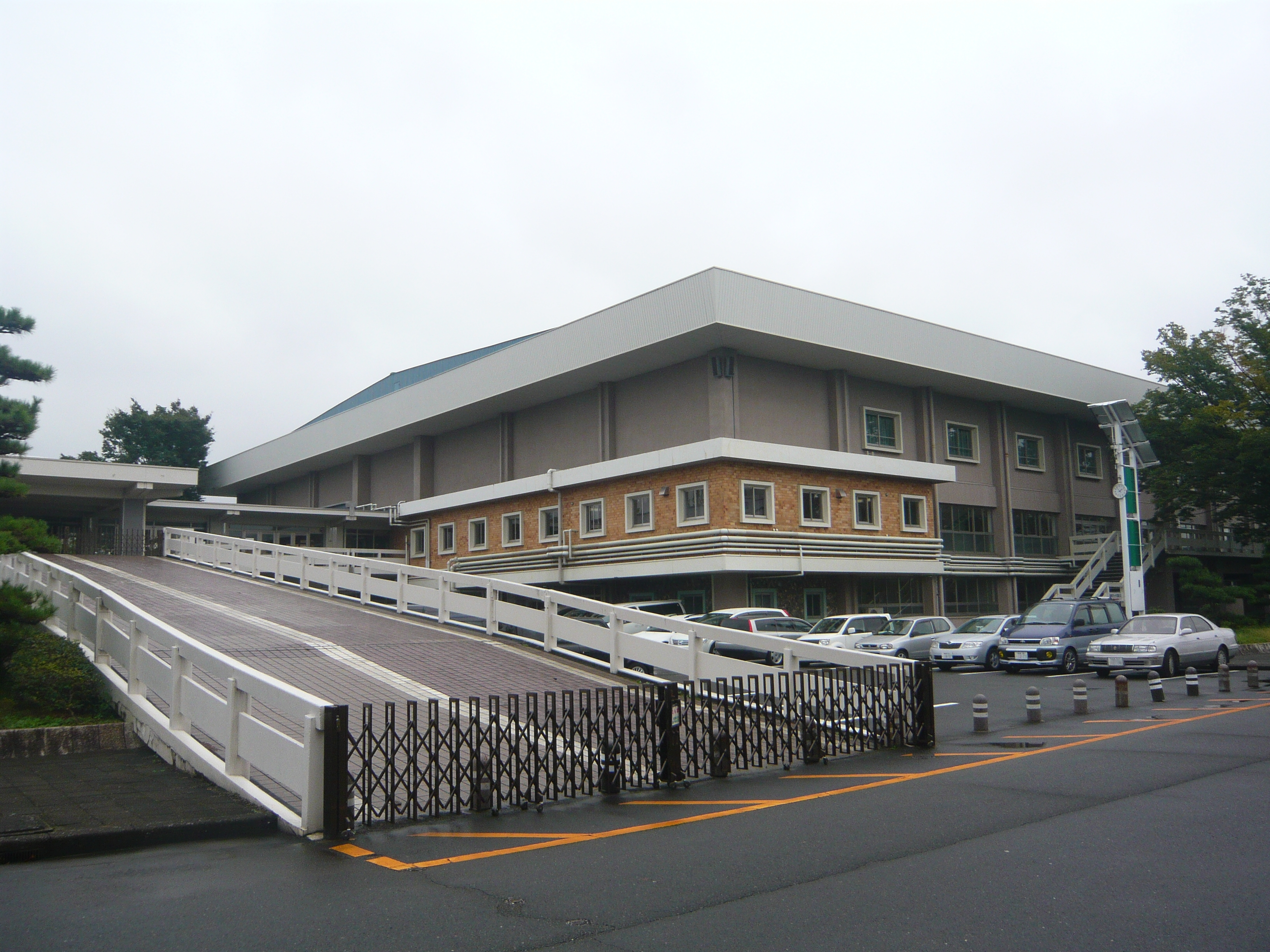
- Interactive map of OKB Gifu Seiryu Arena
- Full name: Gifu Arena
- Location: Gifu, Gifu, Japan
- Owner: Gifu Prefecture
- Operator: Gifu Arena
- Capacity: 3,500
- Parking: 3,000

Construction
- Opened: 1965
- Cost

Tenant
- Gifu Swoops

Website
- http://gifu-arena.dolphin-group.co.jp/

OKB Gifu Seiryu Arena is an arena in Gifu, Gifu, Japan. It is the home arena of the Gifu Swoops of the B.League, Japan's professional basketball league.

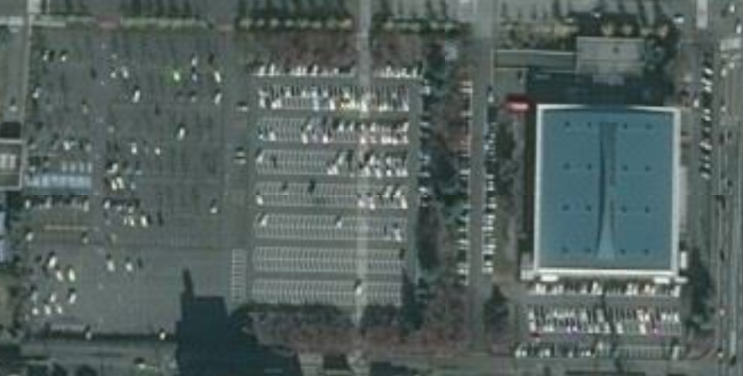
Satellite view
