= Kagoshima Arena =

Arena in Kagoshima, Japan

Coordinates: 31°36′05″N 130°32′07.45″E

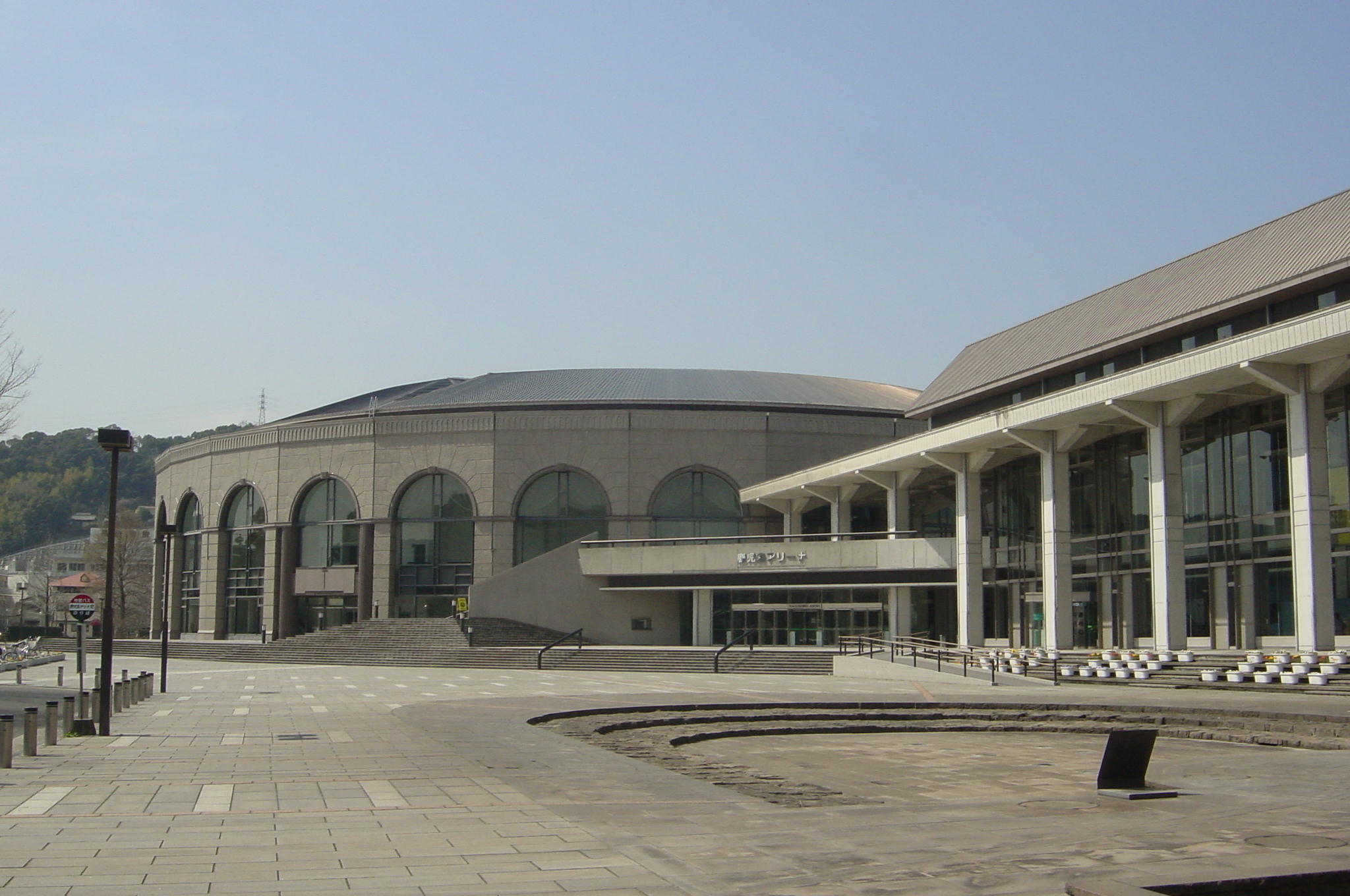

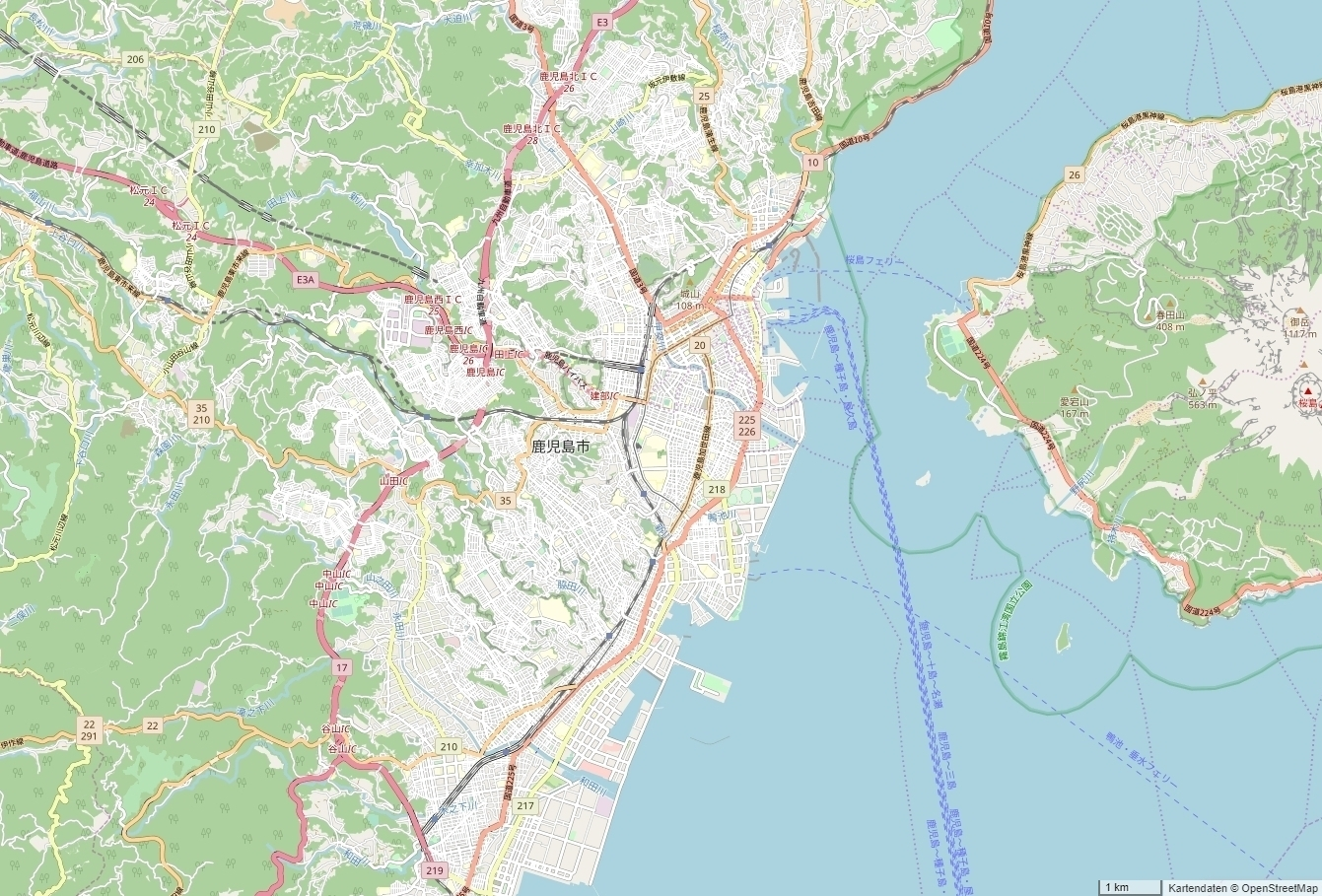
- Location within Kagoshima, Kagoshima Location within Kagoshima Prefecture Location within Japan
- Interactive map of Kagoshima Arena
- Location: Kagoshima, Japan
- Owner: City of Kagoshima
- Operator: Kagoshima Convention & Visitors Bureau
- Capacity: 5,700

Construction
- Opened: 1992
- Cost: JPY 10.7 billion

Tenants
- Kagoshima Rebnise; 2011 UCI Indoor Cycling World Championships

Website
- http://kagoshima-arena.jp/

Kagoshima Arena (also known as Nishihara Shokai Arena) is an indoor sporting arena located in Kagoshima, Japan. The capacity of the arena is 5,000 and was opened in 1992. It hosted some matches for the 2003 FIVB Women's World Cup.

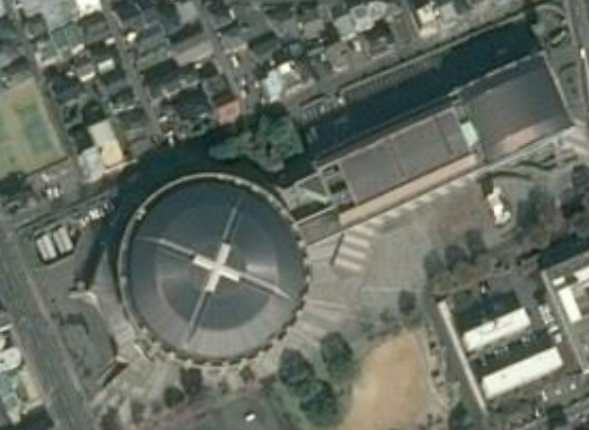
Satellite view
