= Noriyuki Kitaya =

Japanese basketball coach

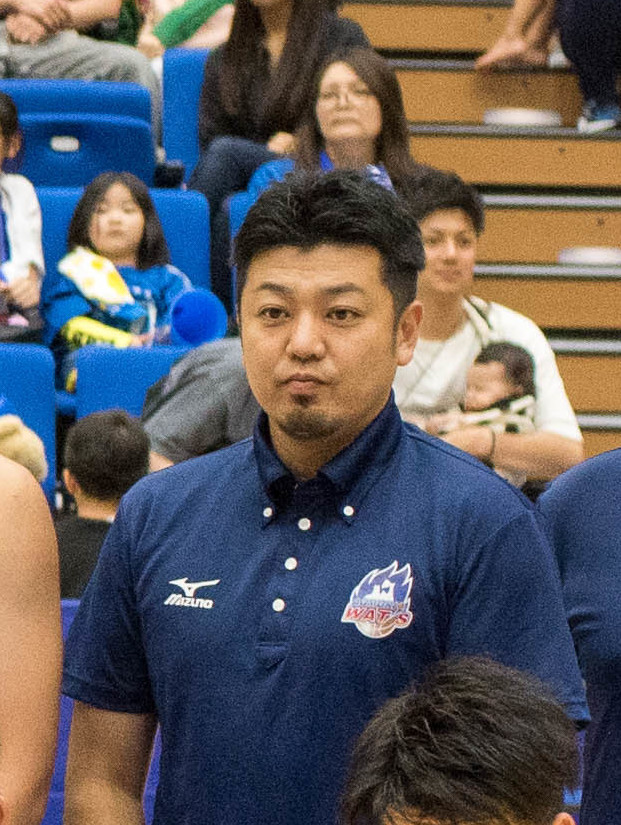

Personal information
- Born: October 10, 1980 (age 46) Tsuruta, Aomori

Career information
- High school: Hirosaki Jitsugyo (Hirosaki, Aomori)
- College: Takushoku University
- Position: Head coach

Career history

Coaching
- 2018-2021: Aomori Wat's

Noriyuki Kitaya (北谷稔行, Kitaya Noriyuki) is the head coach of the Aomori Wat's in the Japanese B.League.

== Head coaching record ==
Legend
Regular season	G	Games coached	W	Games won	L	Games lost	W–L %	Win–loss %
Playoffs	PG	Playoff games	PW	Playoff wins	PL	Playoff losses	PW–L %	Playoff win–loss %

Team	Year	G	W	L	W–L%	Finish	PG	PW	PL	PW–L%	Result
Aomori Wat's	2018	22	9	13	.409	5th in B2 Eastern	-	-	-	–	-
Aomori Wat's	2018-19	60	15	45	.250	6th in B2 Eastern	-	-	-	–	-
Aomori Wat's	2019-20	47	21	26	.447	4th in B2 Eastern	-	-	-	–	-
