= Kazuo Kusumoto =

Japanese basketball coach

Kazuo Kusumoto 楠本和生
Kagoshima Rebnise
- Position: Head coach
- League: B.League

Personal information
- Born: May 31, 1964 (age 62) Osaka Prefecture

Career information
- High school: Higashiosaka College Kashiwara (Kashiwara, Osaka)
- College: Osaka University of Health and Sport Sciences
- Coaching career: 2011–present

Career history

Coaching
- 2011: Hyogo Storks (asst.)
- 2016: Tokyo Cinq Reves
- 2017: Tokyo Cinq Reves
- 2017-2018: Kagoshima Rebnise
- 2018: Gifu Swoops
- 2019-present: Kagoshima Rebnise

Kazuo Kusumoto (楠本和生, Kusumoto Kazuo) is the head coach of the Kagoshima Rebnise basketball team in the Japanese B.League.

== Head coaching record ==
Legend
Regular season	G	Games coached	W	Games won	L	Games lost	W–L %	Win–loss %
Playoffs	PG	Playoff games	PW	Playoff wins	PL	Playoff losses	PW–L %	Playoff win–loss %

Team	Year	G	W	L	W–L%	Finish	PG	PW	PL	PW–L%	Result
Kagoshima Rebnise	2017-18	42	19	23	.452	6th in B3	20	8	12	.400	4th in Final stage
Gifu Swoops	2018-19	20	5	15	.250	Fired	-	-	-	–	-
