= Kenta Tateyama =

Japanese basketball player

Kenta Tateyama 館山健太
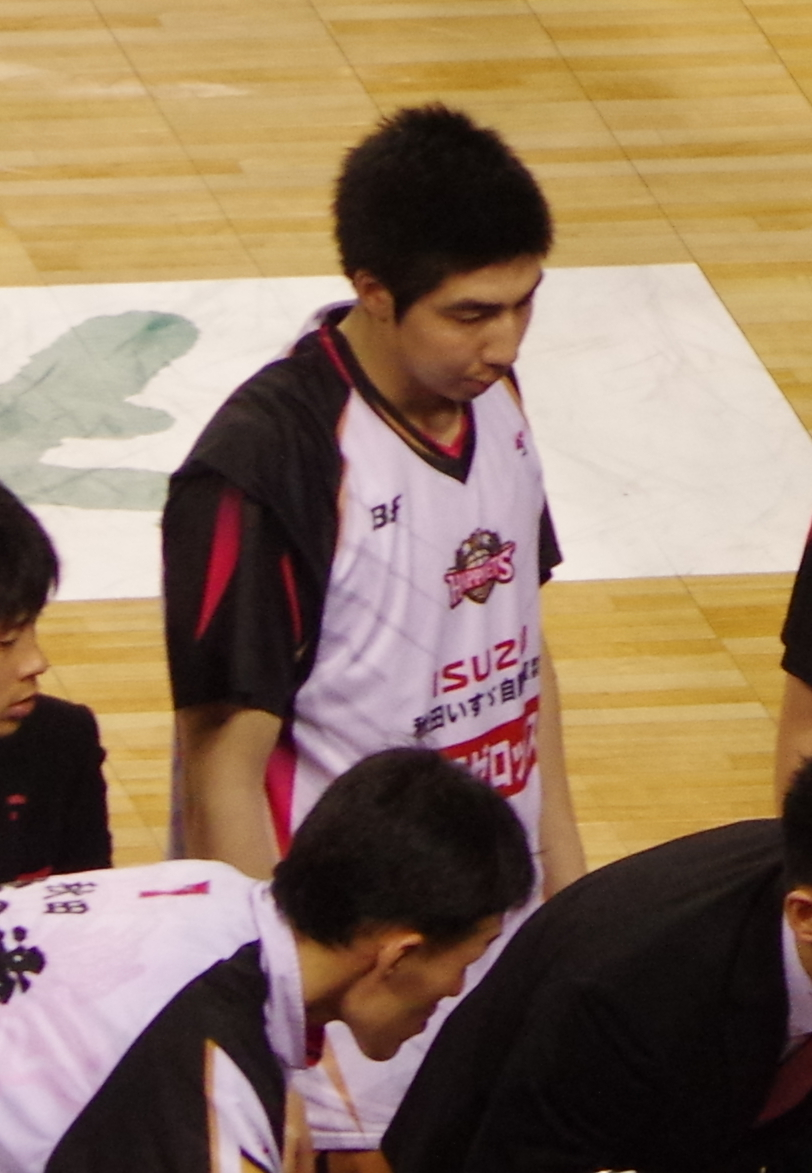
- Tateyama in 2014

Personal information
- Born: December 26, 1990 (age 35) Akita, Akita, Japan
- Listed height: 6 ft 3 in (1.91 m)
- Listed weight: 198 lb (90 kg)

Career information
- High school: Noshiro Technical (Noshiro, Akita)
- College: Senshu University (2009–2013)
- Playing career: 2013–2020
- Position: Small forward
- Number: 6

Career history
- 2013–2016: Akita Northern Happinets
- 2016-2017: Aomori Wat's
- 2017-2019: Kagoshima Rebnise
- 2019-2020: Tokyo Hachioji Bee Trains
- 2020: Saitama Broncos

Career highlights
- 2× B3 Three Point Field Goal Percentage Leader (2018, 19); 2× Japanese High School champions

Kenta Tateyama (born December 26, 1990) is a Japanese former professional basketball player who last played for the Saitama Broncos of the B3 League in Japan. He was referred as a genius by Akita's former head coach Kazuo Nakamura.

== Stephen Curry Asia Tour 2018 ==
In a three-on-three exhibition, he competed against "Team Curry" in Shibuya, Tokyo on September 11, 2018.

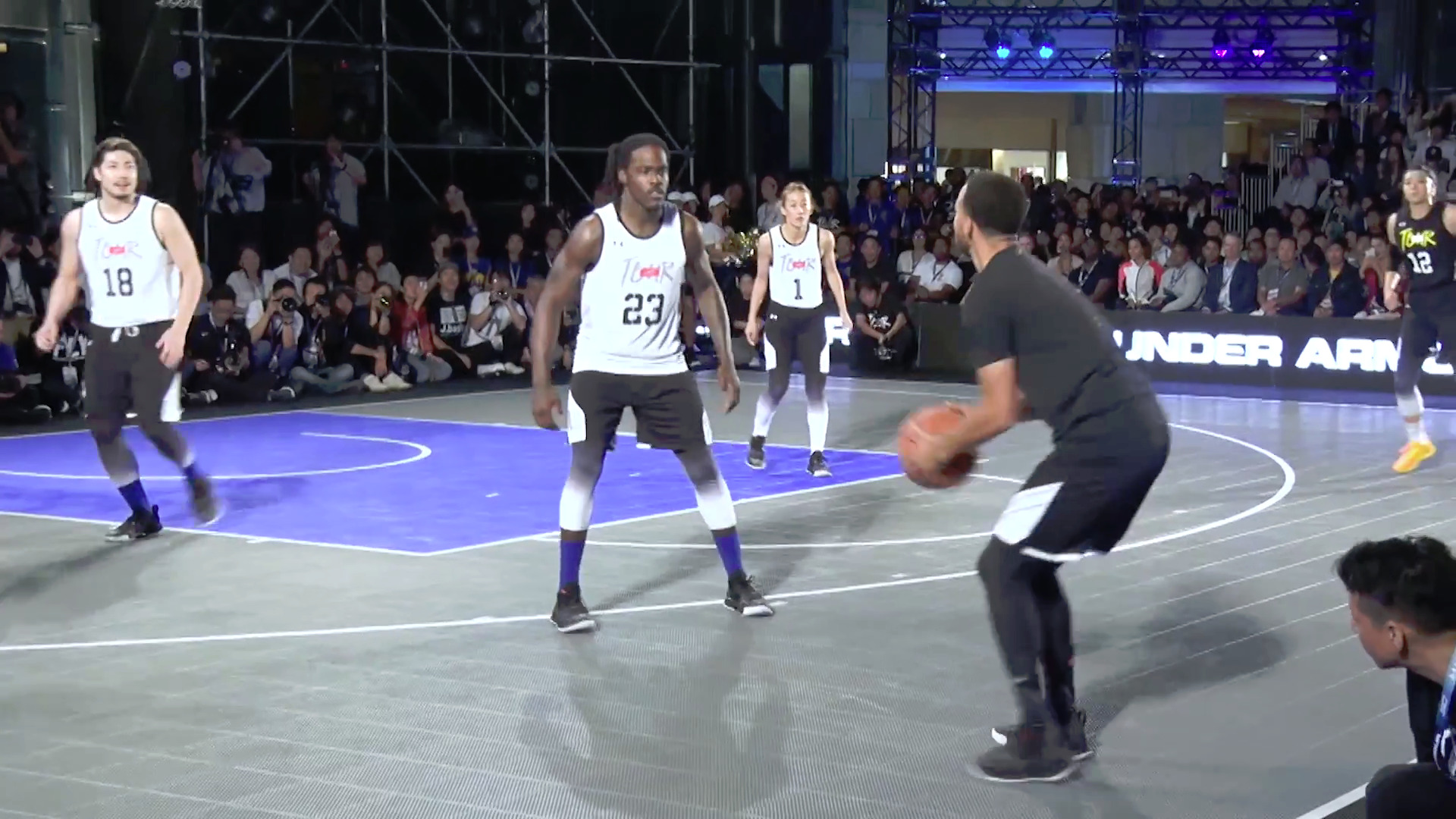
Curry and Tateyama (#18)

== Career statistics ==
Legend
GP	Games played	GS	Games started	MPG	Minutes per game
FG%	Field goal percentage	3P%	3-point field goal percentage	FT%	Free throw percentage
RPG	Rebounds per game	APG	Assists per game	SPG	Steals per game
BPG	Blocks per game	PPG	Points per game	**Bold**	Career high

*	Led the league

=== Regular season ===
Year	Team	GP	GS	MPG	FG%	3P%	FT%	RPG	APG	SPG	BPG	PPG
2012-13	Akita	8	1	6.2	25.0	26.3	75.0	0.4	0.2	0.2	0.0	2.2
2013-14	Akita	25	2	3.5	26.3	20.7	50.0	0.3	0.2	0.1	0.0	1.2
2014-15	Akita	49	1	7.3	45.3	36.8	68.4	0.9	0.3	0.1	0.1	3.8
2015-16	Akita	25	0	6.6	31.7	21.2	**100**	1.2	0.7	0.2	0.0	2.1
2016-17	Aomori	50	49	**23.6**	**46.2**	37.0	76.1	2.6	1.9	0.5	**0.6**	8.2
2017-18	Kagoshima	**58**	**50**	22.9	43.2	37.8 (RS 42.1)	70.0	**2.8**	**3.0**	**0.7**	0.4	**8.7**
2018-19	Kagoshima	54	35	19.1	39.0	38.2 (RS43.41)	66.7	1.8	2.5	0.4	0.3	7.4
2019-20	Hachioji	25	0	17.5	44.4	**41.0**	52.6	2.2	1.4	0.4	0.2	7.1
2019-20	Saitama	10	0	19.0	37.5	40.0	50.0	1.4	2.0	0.4	0.3	4.3

=== Playoffs ===
Year	Team	GP	GS	MPG	FG%	3P%	FT%	RPG	APG	SPG	BPG	PPG
2013-14	Akita	5	0	5.80	.500	.333	.667	0.8	0.0	0.2	0	2.2

== Trivia ==
He is so fond of fishing.
