= Julius Jucikas =

Lithuanian basketball player (born 1989)

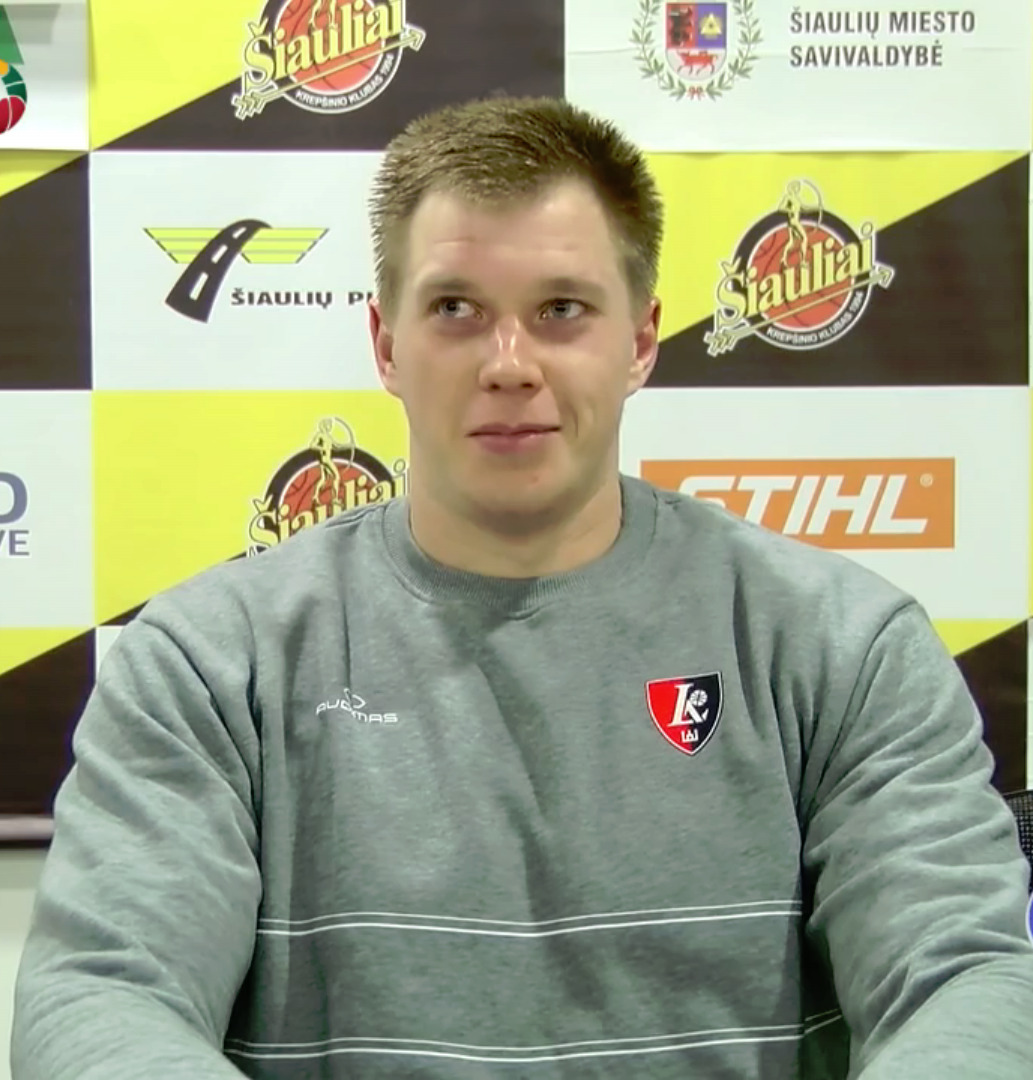

BC Šilutė
- Position: Center
- League: Nacionalinė krepšinio lyga (NKL)

Personal information
- Born: 20 October 1989 (age 37) Šilutė, Lithuanian SSR, Soviet Union
- Listed height: 6 ft 8.5 in (2.04 m)
- Listed weight: 266 lb (121 kg)

Career information
- Playing career: 2009–present

Career history
- 2009–2010: Šilutė
- 2010–2011: Šiauliai
- 2011–2012: →University of Šiauliai-ABRO Šiauliai
- 2012–2015: Šiauliai
- 2015–2017: Lietuvos rytas Vilnius
- 2016: →Dzūkija Alytus
- 2017–2018: BK Ventspils
- 2018–2019: Aomori Wat's
- 2019–2020: Juventus Utena
- 2021: Nevėžis-OPTIBET
- 2021–2022: Neptūnas Klaipėda
- 2022: Stjarnan
- 2022–2023: Pieno žvaigždės
- 2023: BC Gargždai-SC
- 2023: Mes Rafsanjan
- 2023-2024: Prawira Bandung
- 2024-2025: BC Olimpas Palanga
- 2025-present: BC Šilutė

Career highlights
- Latvian League champion (2018)

Julius Jucikas (born 20 October 1989) is a Lithuanian professional basketball player. Standing at 6 ft 8.5 in (2.04 m), he plays at the center position.

== Playing career ==
A 19-year-old Jucikas started his career with Šilutė of the NKL in 2009.

On 6 July 2015, Jucikas signed with Lietuvos rytas Vilnius of the Lithuanian Basketball League. After two seasons, for both Jucikas and the club, much of which Jucikas mostly spent on the bench, his contract for the 2017–2018 season was terminated by mutual agreement with the team.

On 15 July 2017, he signed with BK Ventspils. He helped Ventspils win the Latvian championship.

In August 2022, Jucikas signed with Úrvalsdeild karla club Stjarnan. He left Stjarnan in end of December after averaging 14.5 points and 6.5 rebounds in 11 games.

== Personal life ==
His younger brother Matas Jucikas is also a professional basketball player.
