= Gifu Swoops =

- Division: Third
- Leagues: B.League
- Founded: 2003
- Arena: OKB Gifu Seiryu Arena
- Location: Gifu, Gifu
- President: Fumiaki Nasu
- Head coach: Kenji Kajimoto
- Website: www.gifu-swoops.com
Home	Away

The Gifu Swoops are a Japanese professional basketball team based in Gifu. The team most recently competed in the third division of the B.League. Starting from the 2026–27 season, the team will compete in the B.League One, the league's second division, as a member of the Central Conference.

== Coaches ==
- Kenji Kajimoto
- Kazuo Kusumoto

== Roster ==
Former logo

Gifu Swoops roster
Players
Coaches

Pos.	No.	Nat.	Name
PF	4	(United States)	Jerrel Wright
SF	7	(Japan)	Morito Koga
SG	8	(Japan)	Masahiro Tanaka
PG	10	(Japan)	Hunter Cort
SG	17	(Japan)	Norio Sugimoto
SF	18	(Japan)	Yosuke Yamada
PF	22	(Japan)	Yuta Masumoto
C	23	(Senegal)	Sambou Andre
C	25	(Lithuania)	Matas Jucikas
PG	33	(Japan)	Ryoya Arakawa
PF	42	(United States)	Noah Dahlman
PG	67	(Japan)	Asuka Seino

Head coach

(Japan) Kenji Kajimoto

Legend

- (C) Team captain
- Injured

- Roster
Updated: 22 December 2022

== Notable players ==
- Mike Allison
- Adam Drexler
- Bingo Merriex
- Joe Wolfinger

== Arenas ==
- OKB Gifu Seiryu Arena
- Gifu Memorial Center
- Gujo City General Sports Center
- Sekishin Fureai Arena
- Gero Exchange Hall On Arena
