= Chukwudiebere Maduabum =

Nigerian basketball player (born 1991)

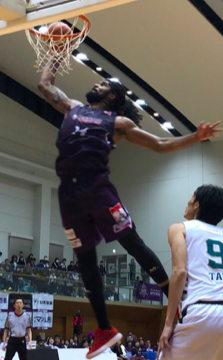
- Maduabum with Yamagata Wyverns in 2018

No. 28 – Osaka Evessa
- Position: Power forward / center
- League: B.League

Personal information
- Born: March 19, 1991 (age 35) Lagos, Nigeria
- Listed height: 2.06 m (6 ft 9 in)
- Listed weight: 119 kg (262 lb)

Career information
- High school: Command Day Secondary School (Lagos, Nigeria)
- NBA draft: 2011: 2nd round, 56th overall pick
- Drafted by: Los Angeles Lakers
- Playing career: 2011–present

Career history
- 2009: Dodan Warriors
- 2010: Kano Pillars
- 2011–2012: Bakersfield Jam
- 2013: Al-Shamal
- 2013: Tallinna Kalev
- 2014: SBL Khasiin Khuleguud
- 2014: Fort Wayne Mad Ants
- 2015: Tallinna Kalev
- 2015: Keflavík
- 2015: Tampereen Pyrintö
- 2015: Tampereen Pyrintö II
- 2016: Gegeen Khangai Leader
- 2016–2017: Kagoshima Rebnise
- 2017–2018: Cyberdyne Ibaraki Robots
- 2018–2020: Passlab Yamagata Wyverns
- 2020: Rizing Zephyr Fukuoka
- 2021–2023: Tryhoop Okayama
- 2023–2024: Tokyo United
- 2024–2025: Veertien Mie
- 2026–present: Osaka Evessa

Career highlights
- Mongolian League champion (2014); 2× Mongolian League All-Star (2014, 2016); 2x Japanese League Block leader (2017, 2019)
- Stats at Basketball Reference

Chukwudiebere "Chu" Maduabum (born March 19, 1991) is a Nigerian professional basketball player for Osaka Evessa of the Japanese B.League. He was drafted 56th overall by the Los Angeles Lakers in the 2011 NBA draft before his rights were traded to the Denver Nuggets.

Maduabum, a 6'9" power forward, was the third player drafted straight from the D-League, following fellow second round picks Mike Taylor and Latavious Williams. He played for the Dodan Warriors and the Kano Pillars in Nigeria before going to the D-League, and has also played in the FIBA Africa Club Championship.

== Professional career ==
=== NBA and NBA D-League ===
On March 18, 2011, Maduabum was acquired by the Bakersfield Jam of the NBA D-League. He went on to average 0.7 points and 1.0 blocks in three games during 2010–11.

On June 23, 2011, Maduabum was selected with the 56th overall pick in the 2011 NBA draft by the Los Angeles Lakers. His rights were later traded to the Denver Nuggets on draft night.

On January 24, 2012, Maduabum was reacquired by the Bakersfield Jam. However, he was later waived on February 1, 2012, after just one game due to injury.

In July 2012, Maduabum joined the Nuggets for the 2012 NBA Summer League where he averaged 2.3 points and 2.7 rebounds in three games.

On February 19, 2015, the Nuggets traded to draft rights to Maduabum, along with JaVale McGee and a future first-round pick via the Oklahoma City Thunder, to the Philadelphia 76ers.

On February 18, 2016, the 76ers traded the draft rights to Maduabum to the Houston Rockets as part of a three team trade with the Detroit Pistons. However, his rights would return to the 76ers four days later, as the Pistons rescinded their trade, following a failed physical by Donatas Motiejūnas.

On July 15, 2016, the 76ers traded the draft rights to Maduabum to the Cleveland Cavaliers, in exchange for Sasha Kaun and cash considerations.

=== Qatar ===
In January 2013, Maduabum signed with Al-Shamal of Qatar's D1 league where he averaged 9.4 points, 8.5 rebounds, 3.6 blocks and 1.0 assists in eight games.

=== Estonia ===
In November 2013, Maduabum signed with Tallinna Kalev of Estonia for the 2013–14 season. In December 2013, he left Tallinna after three Estonian League games and two Baltic League games.

=== Mongolia ===
In January 2014, Maduabum signed with Khasiin Khuleguud of Mongolia for the rest of the 2013–14 season. He went on earn league All-Star honors and helped them win the 2014 championship.

=== Return to D-League ===
On November 2, 2014, Maduabum was acquired by the Fort Wayne Mad Ants. On December 2, 2014, he was waived by the Mad Ants after appearing in four games.

=== Return to Estonia ===
On January 9, 2015, Maduabum re-signed with Tallinna Kalev. He later left Tallinna Kalev.

=== Short terms in Iceland & Finland ===
On August 7, 2015, Maduabum signed with Keflavík of the Icelandic Premier League after averaging 7.6 points and 5.1 rebounds per game with Tallinna Kalev.

In September, Maduabum signed with Finnish Korisliiga team Tampereen Pyrintö where he played in eight matches averaging 2.1 points, 3.4 rebounds and 0.9 blocks per game before exiting the team at the beginning of November. He also played one game with Pyrintö II in First Division A.

=== Return to Mongolia ===
For the rest of the 2015–16 season, Maduabum would play with the Gegeen Khangai Leader in Mongolia. He'd later be named an All-Star for the second season in a row in Mongolia.

=== Japan ===
On September 21, 2016, Maduabum signed with Kagoshima Rebnise of the Japanese Second Division. In July 2017, he moved to Cyberdyne Ibaraki Robots. In August, 2018 he came terms with Passlab Yamagata Wyverns.
