= Matthew Kendrick =

American basketball player

No. 5 – Toyoda Gosei Scorpions
- Positions: Power forward, Center
- League: B.League

Personal information
- Born: January 15, 1990 (age 36) Tampa, Florida
- Listed height: 7 ft 0 in (2.13 m)
- Listed weight: 230 lb (104 kg)

Career information
- High school: Chamberlain Senior (Tampa, Florida)
- College: Saint Leo
- NBA draft: 2012: undrafted
- Playing career: 2012–present

Career history
- 2016–present: Toyoda Gosei Scorpions

Matthew Thomas Kendrick (born January 15, 1990) is an American professional basketball player for the Toyoda Gosei Scorpions in Japan.
