= Matas Jucikas =

Lithuanian basketball player (born 1994)

Sudūva-Mantinga
- Position: Center
- League: Nacionalinė krepšinio lyga (NKL)

Personal information
- Born: February 10, 1994 (age 32) Šilutė, Lithuania
- Listed height: 6 ft 8.75 in (2.05 m)
- Listed weight: 200 lb (91 kg)

Career information
- NBA draft: 2016: undrafted
- Playing career: 2013–present

Career history
- 2013–2014: Olimpas Plungė
- 2014–2015: BC Barsy Atyrau
- 2015–2016: BC Palanga
- 2016–2018: Neptūnas Klaipėda
- 2016–2017: →BC Šiauliai
- 2018: Jūrmala
- 2018-2019: BC Kuršiai
- 2019–2020: Nevėžis Kėdainiai
- 2020–2021: Dzūkija Alytus
- 2021–2022: BC Nevėžis
- 2022: BK Ogre
- 2022–2023: Gifu Swoops
- 2023–2024: BK Ogre
- 2024-present: Sūduva-Mantinga

Matas Jucikas (born February 10, 1994) is a Lithuanian professional basketball player who last played for Gifu Swoops of the Japanese B.League.

== Professional career ==
On August 10, 2016, Jucikas signed a three-year deal with Neptūnas Klaipėda of the Lithuanian Basketball League. On November 12, 2016, he was lent to BC Šiauliai, but was recalled to the team on January 13, 2017.

On September 5, 2019, he has signed with Nevėžis Kėdainiai of the Lithuanian Basketball League.

On January 21, 2022, he has signed with BK Ogre of the Latvijas Basketbola līga (LBL).

On August 25, 2022, Jucikas signed with Gifu Swoops of the Japanese B.League.

== Personal life ==
His older brother Julius Jucikas is also a professional basketball player.
