= Kikuo Chishima =

Japanese medical researcher

- 千島 喜久男
- Born: October 10, 1899; Kamitakara, Gifu Prefecture, Japan
- Died: October 23, 1978 (aged 79)
- Education: Toho Medical University
- Known for: Neo-Haematology
- Scientific career
- Fields: Medical research
- Workplaces: Gifu University, Nagoya University

Kikuo Chishima (千島 喜久男, Chishima Kikuo; October 10, 1899 – October 23, 1978) was a Japanese medical researcher known for advocating a variant of the Soviet medical biologist Olga Lepeshinskaya's pseudoscientific cellular theories. His work in this field, referred to as neo-haematology, has been largely discredited.

== Biography ==
Chishima was born in the village of Kamitakara in Gifu Prefecture, Japan. In 1953, he became a research professor at Gifu University, and in 1958, he completed his medical training earning a degree from Toho Medical University. Upon his retirement from the faculty at Gifu in 1963, he became a full professor at Nagoya University. In 1964, he created and assumed the chairmanship of the Society of Neo-Haematology. His magnum opus - Chishima's Complete Works Regarding Biological and Medical Sciences - is a multivolume tome encompassing 5 decades of research, of which only volume 9 - Revolution of Biology and Medical Science - has been translated into English. Chishima died aged 79.

== Neo-Haematology ==
Chishima's ideas on cellular theory can be viewed as novel extensions of some obscure theories that arose during Trofim Lysenko's era in Russia. These include the theories of Olga Lepeshinskaya, head of Soviet medicine under Joseph Stalin, to which Chishima extensively referred.

Neo-Haematology adopts the same discredited principles as Lepeshinskaya's cellular theories. Its eight 'revolutionary principles' are as follows:

- Red blood corpuscles with polipotency differentiate into all kinds of somatic cells and germ cells, in accordance with their cellular environmental conditions (milieu).
- Reversible differentiation between the red blood corpuscles and the fixed cellular elements under the different nutritional conditions or the developmental stages
- Bacteria and viruses arise spontaneously from organic matter by means of the AFD process (Aggregation, Fusion and Differentiation).
- Cells increase in number, mainly by the new-formation of them from organic matter but not by the so-called mitotic cell division.
- Haematopoietic organ of the red corpuscle is not the bone marrow but the intestinal villus in the adult and the placental villus in the embryonic stage.
- Orthodox genetics contains some basic mistakes. For instance, according to my finding, the germ cells such as spermatozoa and the ova arise newly from the somatic element, the red blood corpuscles.
- Darwinism involves some important contradictions of the origin of life, the mutation theory, existence of micro-organisms (amoebae, bacteria) which remained as they were without evolution, and then the negligence of symbiosis (mutual aid) as an important evolutional factor, etc.
- I have presented a new scientific methodology, bio-dialectic instead of formal logic or material dialectic.

As can be seen from Chishima's principles, neo-haematology effectively calls for a rejection of significant established biological theories such as the mitotic theory of cellular division. It advocates for the belief in the spontaneous generation of microbes and asserts that tissue elements can differentiate and retro-differentiate based purely on environmental conditions.

Chishima also rejected the chromosome theory of heredity, embracing a form of Lamarckism similar to Lysenkoite biologists in Russia. He advocated a dialectical approach to addressing biological problems, however, he diverged sharply from his Soviet counterparts by rejecting dialectical materialism. Instead, he promoted what he termed bio-dialectics, which incorporated spiritual elements into its framework. The spiritual aspect of Chishima's work stemmed from his desire to reconcile the contradictions between Eastern and Western medicine.

Neo-haematology, based on theories and ideas that have been largely discredited, is considered pseudoscience by both contemporary and historical standards. Despite this, it retains a small following in America and Japan, particularly among proponents of alternative medicine.

== Published Works ==
- Volume I: Life, Cells, The Origin of Blood Corpuscles, Haematopoiesis in the Intestine - This volume critiques several orthodox principles, including the negation of spontaneous generation of microorganisms and conventional cell theory. It presents new theories about cell biology, the origin of life, and hematopoiesis.
- Volume II: Revolution of Heredity, Embryology, and Evolution in Relation to the Origin of Germ Cells - This volume explores the origin of germ cells from blood corpuscles, challenging traditional views on cell division and evolution. It discusses Mendelian genetics, Lysenkoism, and an argued importance of mutual aid in evolutionary theory.
- Volume III: On the Fate of Red Blood Corpuscles: Revolution of Medical and Biological Sciences (Especially Cytological and Histological Points of View) - This volume claims a misunderstood function and fate of red blood corpuscles, asserting their potential to differentiate into various cell types, including cancer cells, under pathological conditions. It emphasizes a need for a fundamental reevaluation of conventional histology, hematology, and other fields of modern medicine, particularly in understanding cancer and promoting healthy blood production.
- Volume IV: Revolution in the Eight Fundamental Principles of Modern Biology and Medicine and Reexamination of the Intramedullary Haematopoietic Theory - This volume discusses eight fundamental principles of modern biology and medicine, proposing practical applications for health and the prolongation of life. It also reexamines the intramedullary haematopoietic theory, highlighting the importance of new scientific methodologies.
- Volume V: Studies on the Hen's Egg - This volume includes a reprint of the monograph "Studies on the Hen's Egg" published in 1933, along with twelve original papers on bird eggs. It covers topics such as the structure, chemical constitution, and preservation of hen's eggs, egg-laying capacity, artificial incubation, and trading prices. The volume also addresses various research findings on hen's egg fluorescence, shape-index correlations, and comparative studies with other species.
- Volume VI: Civilization and Life - This volume discusses the decline of life due to unbalanced material civilization, focusing on the harmful effects of pollutants, toxic chemicals, and radioactivity. It covers a wide range of topics including air and water pollution, industrial hygiene, occupational diseases, the relationship between mind and body, the role of religion in medicine, and the principles of health and longevity.
- Volume VII: Wave and Spiral Tendency of Life Phenomena - Bio-Dialectic - This volume represents the culmination of fifty years of research on the wave and spiral tendencies of life phenomena. It attempts to unify theoretical and experimental biology, exploring topics such as morphological waveness, rhythmic and spiral movements, and their implications for growth, evolution, and the unity of mind and body. The volume also discusses the principles of bio-dialectic, linking scientific methodology with philosophical and religious insights.
- Volume VIII: Complete Collection of the Original Papers in Japanese - This volume contains over one hundred of Chishima's original papers published in various scientific periodicals, including the Japan Zoological Magazine, Japan Anatomical Association, Japan Physiological Association, Bulletin of Gifu University, Japan Zootechnical Science, Japan Applied Zoology, Journal of Insect Biology, Medical Science (Tokyo University), and Biological Science (Iwanami).
- Volume IX: Chishima's New Theory on Biology and Medical Science Translated into English - This volume, written in English, presents the eight revolutionary principles on biology and medicine proposed by Chishima. It also includes a collection of his English papers, providing insights into his scientific theories and contributions.
- Volume X: Scientific Essays, Criticisms on Medical Science, and the Autobiography of this Author - This volume collects Chishima's opinions on various topics in biological and medical sciences, including critiques on the fluoridation of drinking water, the dangers of blood transfusion, the integration of Eastern and Western medicine, and the effects of modern medical treatments. It also addresses broader issues such as world peace, bio-dialectic, and the harmony between mankind and the natural environment, alongside his autobiography.
