= Kagoshima Rebnise =

- Division: Second
- Leagues: B.League
- Founded: 2008
- History: Kagoshima Red Sharks (2007–2008); Renova Kagoshima (2008–2016); Kagoshima Rebnise (2016–present)
- Arena: Kagoshima Arena
- Capacity: 5,000
- Head coach: Fernando Calero Gil Spain
- Website: www.rebnise.jp
Home	Away

Kagoshima Rebnise is a Japanese professional basketball team located in Kagoshima. The team competes in the B.League One, the second division of the B.League, as a member of the Southern Conference. Some players were not paid in 2016–17.

== Roster ==
Kagoshima Rebnise roster
Players
Coaches

Pos.	No.	Nat.	Name
PG	1	(Japan)	Yoshifumi Nakajima
PG	11	(Japan)	Yuji Morita
SF	12	(Japan)	Hiroshi Fujita
PG	15	(Japan)	Aruma Hamada
PF	17	(United States)	Michael Fakuade
SF	21	(Japan)	Tomoya Matsui
SG	23	(United States)	Anthony Gaines Jr.
C	31	(United States)	Logan Routt
PF	32	(Japan)	Shuhei Muto (C)
C	35	(Senegal)	Diop Mame Cheikh Ibrahima
PF	43	(Japan)	Tomonori Imagawa
PG	50	(Japan)	Mitsuki Nagao
SG	58	(Japan)	Yuta Nagayama

Head coach

(Spain) Fernando Calero Gil

Assistant coach(es)

(Japan) Makoto Tanaka

Legend

- (C) Team captain
- Injured

- Roster
Updated: 27 December 2022

== Notable players ==
- Yoshihiko Amano
- Christian Cunningham
- Luke Evans (fr)
- Fumiya Ikei
- Chukwudiebere Maduabum
- Chris Olivier
- Chad Posthumus
- Kenta Tateyama

== Head coaches ==
- Toshihide Sameshima
- Michael Olson (2012–13)
- Masahiro Ohara
- Kazuo Kusumoto
- Predrag Krunić
- Fernando Calero Gil

== Arenas ==
- Kagoshima Arena
- Kagoshima Prefectural Sports Center Gymnasium
- Aira City General Sports Park Gymnasium
- Ibusuki General Gymnasium
- Sun Arena Sendai
- Higashikushira Town General Gymnasium
- Yusui Town Yoshimatsu Gymnasium
