= Aomori Wat's =

- Conference: East
- Division: Second
- Leagues: B.League
- Founded: 2012
- History: bj league (2012–2016); B.League (2016–present)
- Arena: Maeda Arena; Hachinohe East Gymnasium
- Capacity: 5,371
- Location: Aomori Prefecture
- Main sponsor: Aomori Bank
- President: (Japan) Yasunori Shimoyama
- Championships: None
- Website: aomori-wats.jp
Home	Away

The Aomori Wat's (青森ワッツ, Aomori Wattsu) are a Japanese professional basketball team based in Aomori. The team competes in the B.League One, the second division of the B.League, as a member of the Northern Conference.

== Roster ==
Aomori Wat's roster
Players
Coaches

Pos.	No.	Nat.	Name
PG	0	(Japan)	Keisuke Aita
PF	1	(Japan)	Daisuke Saito
G/F	3	(United States)	Chris Kurihara
PF	5	(United States)	Alex Davis
PF	7	(United States)	E. J. Montgomery
G	8	(Japan)	Daichi Shimoyama (C)
G	9	(Japan)	Junki Nozato
SF	11	(Japan)	Mao Fukuda
PG	12	(Japan)	Yuichi Ikeda
SG	15	(Japan)	Akito Uchida
PG	17	(Japan)	Kohei Tsuneta
PF	22	(United States)	Max Hisatake
SF	39	(Japan)	Mone Alex Hall
G	91	(Japan)	Kyonosuke Terashima

Head coach

Junpei Takahara

Assistant coach(es)

Naoki Abo

Legend

- (C) Team captain
- Injured

- Roster
Updated: 24 March 2023

== Notable players ==
To appear in this section a player must have either:

- Set a club record or won an individual award as a professional player.
- Played at least one official international match for his senior national team or one NBA game at any time.
- (United States) Kwame Alexander
- (United States) Kyle Barone
- (United States) Joe Burton
- (United States) Tiny Gallon
- (United States) Lakeem Jackson
- (Lithuania) Julius Jucikas
- (United States) Anthony Kent (es)
- (Japan) Yūki Kitamuki (fr)
- (Guyana) Gordon Klaiber
- (Japan) Yoshifumi Nakajima
- (Japan) Junki Nozato
- (Uganda) Stanley Ocitti
- (United States) Jesse Perry
- (United States) Gyno Pomare
- (United States) Damian Saunders
- (Japan) Makoto Sawaguchi
- (Uganda) Brandon Sebirumbi
- (Japan) Daichi Shimoyama
- (Japan) Kenichi Takahashi
- (Japan) Kenta Tateyama
- (United States) Alan Wiggins
- (Japan) Yuki Yamaguchi

== Coaches ==
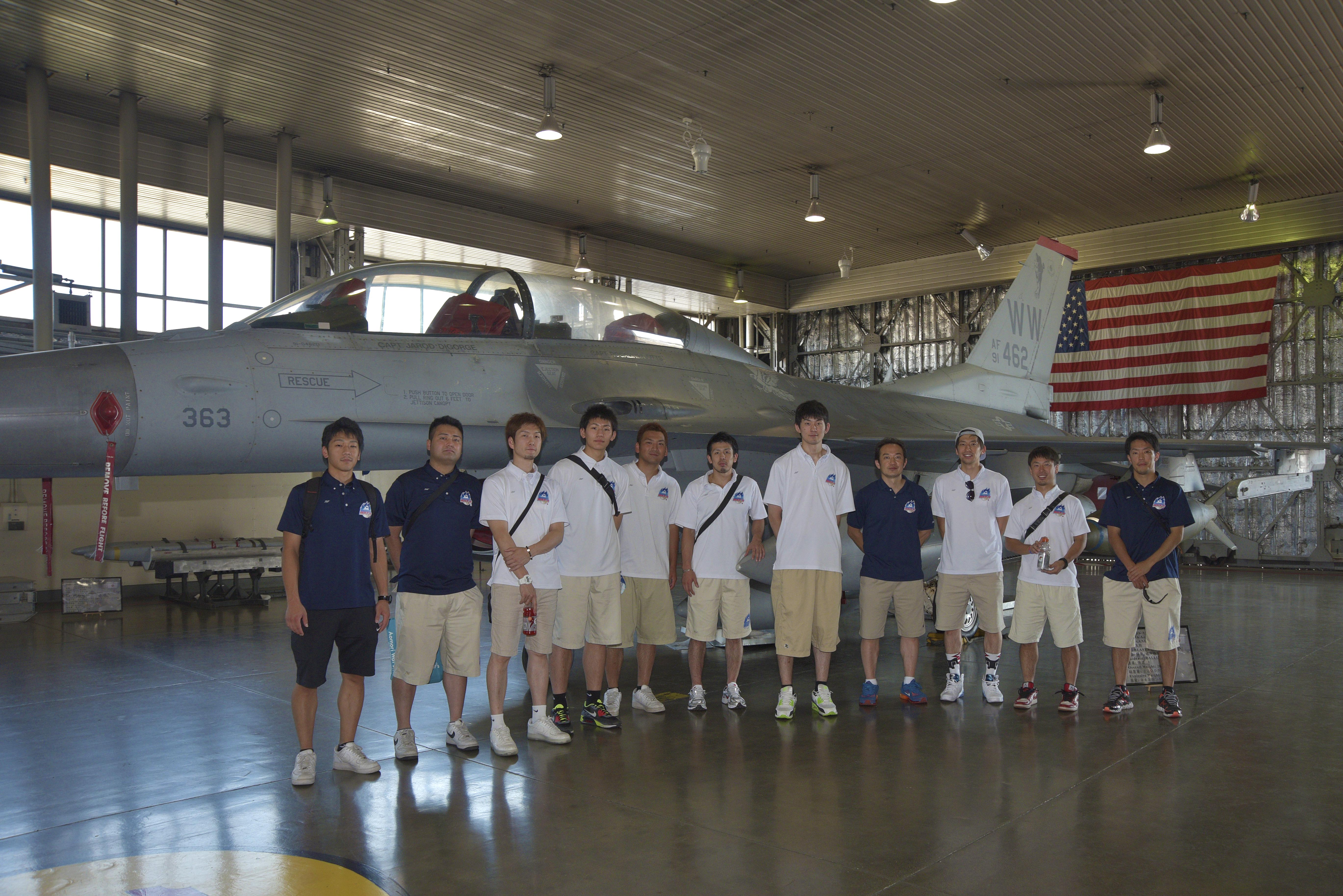
Wat's at Misawa Air Base in 2015

- Koju Munakata
- Nobunaga Sato
- Noriyuki Kitaya
- Takeshi Hotta
- Fernando Calero Gil
- Jumpei Takahara

== Arenas ==
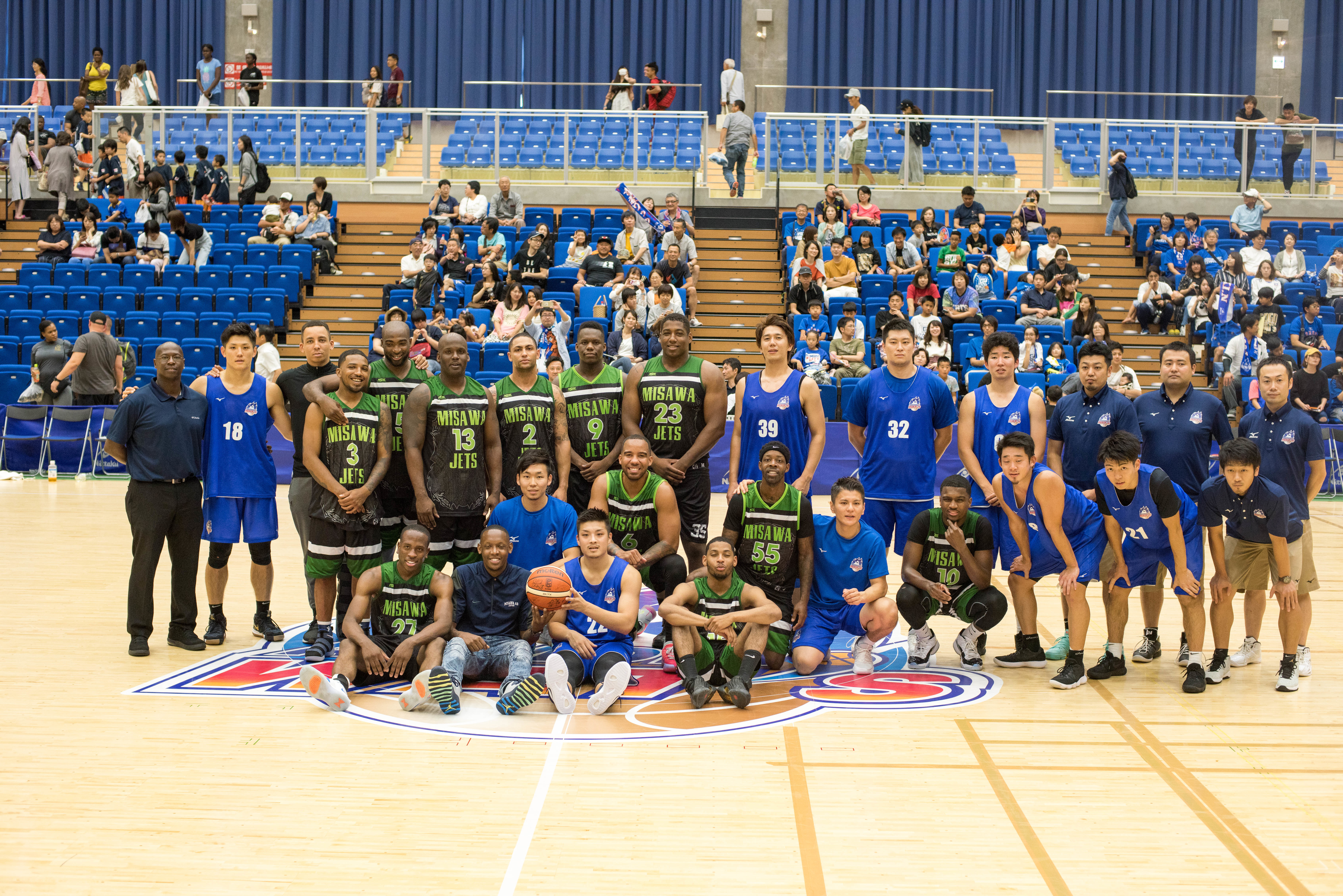
Misawa Jets vs. Aomori Wat's at Misawa International Sports Center in 2018

- Maeda Arena
- Flat Hachinohe
- Misawa International Sports Center
- Hachinohe City Higashi Gymnasium
- Kakuhiro Group Stadium
- Goshogawa Citizens Gymnasium
- Spocul-in Kuroishi
