= Anabuki =

Anabuki may refer to:

- Anabuki (surname)
- Anabuki Construction, a Japanese construction and real estate company
- Anabuki Kosan, a Japanese real estate company, now separate from the above
- Anabuki, Tokushima, now part of Mima on Shikoku, Japan
  - Anabuki Station
- Anabuki River, a tributary of Yoshino River on Shikoku, Japan
