= Hiroshima Lightning =

- Leagues: bj league
- Founded: April 2013
- History: 2013–2016
- Arena: Asaminami-ku Sports Center (Capacity: 359)
- Location: Asaminami-ku, Hiroshima, Japan
- Team colors: Purple, Yellow
- President: Kenta Nakashima
- Head coach: Joe Navarro (basketball)
- Ownership: Hiroshima Pro Basketball Co., Ltd.
- Championships: None
Uniform	Uniform

The Hiroshima Lightning (広島ライトニング, Hiroshima Raitoningu) were a professional basketball team based in Hiroshima, Japan. They spent one season (2015–2016) in the Western Conference of the Japanese bj league and then folded after being denied entry into the B.League, the bj league's replacement.

== History ==
=== Formation ===
Kenta Nakashima, a Hiroshima-born professional basketball player who had spent time with the Tokyo Apache and Vancouver Volcanoes, returned to his home town in 2012 with the intention of establishing a professional basketball team within Hiroshima Prefecture. Despite facing opposition from the Hiroshima Prefectural Basketball Association, who did not want a professional team within the prefecture, he established a company named Hiroshima Pro Basketball Co., Ltd. in April 2013. In July 2013 the bj league announced that it would commence a new minor league in August 2014, and that the club team operated by Hiroshima Pro Basketball would be granted entry into the league.

=== bj Challenge League 2015 ===
In October 2014 Nakashima held a press conference in Hiroshima with bj league commissioner Toshimitsu Kawachi and other league officials to announce that the bj Challenge League would commence in January 2015. At the same press conference, Nakashima announced his team would be named the Hiroshima Sun Stars and introduced Joe Navarro (Nakashima's former head coach in Vancouver) as the team's head coach and five players who had been contracted to play. The press conference was held a week before the Hiroshima Dragonflies, another professional basketball team formed by a rival group, played their first match in the National Basketball League, the bj league's competitor. In December 2014 Nakashima announced that the team's name was to be changed to the Lightning due to receipt of a complaint from a manufacturing company.

Along with the Lightning, the Hyogo Impulse was the only other team ready to complete in the first round of the bj Challenge League. The round consisted of six games between the two teams played between January and April 2015. Hiroshima won all six matches by an average of 35 points, with the team's three home matches being played at the Naka-ku Sports Center, Asakita-ku Sports Center and Asaminami-ku Sports Center. On 6 April 2015, the day after the Lightning's fifth win against the Impulse, Nakashima held a press conference to announce that the Lightning had been granted entry into the bj league's 2015–2016 season, which was to commence in October 2015. The team's entry into the league was made possible due to the withdrawal of a Nagasaki-based team the previous month.

A second round of the Challenge League was held between June and August 2015, with the Gifu Seiryu Heroes joining as a third team in July.

=== Failed B.League bid ===
In early 2015 it was announced that the bj league and NBL would merge to form a new league to commence in the new 2016–17 season. In April 2015 both the Lightning and Dragonflies submitted applications to enter the new league (later named the B.League). However, only the NBL's Dragonflies received support from the Hiroshima Prefectural Basketball Association. Supporting documentation from the local association was a requirement for acceptance into the new league. The Lightning lodged an appeal with the Japan Sports Arbitration Agency in June, which was withdrawn soon after following the new league's administration agreeing to reconsider the Lightning's application. Ultimately, it was announced on 16 July that the Lightning was refused entry into the league, the only team out of the 46 active teams across the two leagues to be denied entry. The Dragonflies were assigned to the league's second division.

=== bj league 2015–16 season ===
Before their first season in the bj league, the Lightning signed Americans Andre Murray and Adam Herman and Bahaman Gjio Bain as their three import players. The team played their first match on 2 October 2015, which ended as a 127–75 loss at home to the Ryukyu Golden Kings. The team suffered a further four losses before recording their first win on 18 October by defeating the Takamatsu Five Arrows 95–79. This would be the team's only win in the 52-game season, as they lost their next 44 games in a row to finish with a 1–49 record, the worst in the league's 11-year history. On 15 April 2016 the club announced that two home matches against the Tokyo Cinq Rêves that were postponed in December 2015 were to be forfeited due to "unavoidable circumstances attributable to the home team", effectively shortening each team's season to 50 games. The team had an average attendance of 322 at its 24 home games.

== Notable players ==
- Gjio Bain
- Yuji Funayama (basketball)
- Adam Herman
- Andre Murray [tl]
- Takeshi Nomoto

== Coaches ==
- Joe Navarro (basketball)
- Kenta Nakajima
- Hideki Katsumata
- Takatoshi Ishibashi
