= Ryan Richards =

British basketball player (born 1991)

Free agent
- Position: Center

Personal information
- Born: 24 April 1991 (age 35) Chatham, Kent, England
- Listed height: 6 ft 11 in (2.11 m)
- Listed weight: 265 lb (120 kg)

Career information
- NBA draft: 2010: 2nd round, 49th overall pick
- Drafted by: San Antonio Spurs
- Playing career: 2009–present

Career history
- 2009: Belfius Mons-Hainaut
- 2009: La Caja Gran Canaria
- 2010: BBC Monthey
- 2011–2012: Lugano Tigers
- 2012: Sokhumi
- 2012–2013: Asseco Prokom Gdynia
- 2013: Zepter Vienna
- 2013: Al Nasr Dubai
- 2013–2014: Ikaros Chalkidas
- 2014: Zepter Vienna
- 2014–2015: Körmend
- 2015: Azad University Tehran
- 2015: Guangxi Rhinos
- 2015–2016: Shahrdari Gorgan
- 2016: Sageese
- 2016: Al-Ahli
- 2016: Karpoš Sokoli
- 2016–2017: Sanat Naft Abadan
- 2018: Hallmann Vienna
- 2019: Surrey Scorchers
- 2019: BC Kalev
- 2020: Plymouth Raiders
- 2020: Phoenix Brussels
- 2020–2021: Surrey Scorchers
- 2021: Petro de Luanda
- 2021–2022: Aomori Wat's
- 2022–2023: Yamaguchi Patriots
- 2024: Shinagawa City
- 2024: Gaiteros del Zulia
- 2024: Terrafirma Dyip

Career highlights
- Austrian League champion (2013)
- Stats at Basketball Reference

Ryan Earl Richards (born 24 April 1991) is a British-Jamaican basketball player who last played for the Terrafirma Dyip of the Philippine Basketball Association (PBA). He began playing in England and has played for short spells for numerous teams in several countries. He was drafted by the San Antonio Spurs with the 49th overall pick in the 2010 NBA draft, but never played a regular season game for the team.

== Junior career ==
In 2005–06, Richards played for the Medway Park Crusaders, making regular appearances with the senior team aged only 14, in the English Basketball League's third division. He averaged four points and four rebounds per game and helped the Crusaders finish runner-up in the 2006 National Shield. He also competed for England at the 2006 U16 European Championship (Division B) as an U15 player. Furthermore, he finished second on the team in scoring (9.7 ppg) and third in rebounding (5.6 rpg).

In 2006–07, Richards played for Gran Canaria's U16 cadet team at the Spanish Academy level. He also competed for its U18 junior squad. He posted a 33-point performance in leading his club to a championship. In April 2007, he played for the World Select team at the Nike Hoop Summit at just 15 years old, going 0-2 from the field in three minutes. He later represented England at the 2007 U16 European Championship (Division B), where he averaged 18.6 points and 11.6 rebounds over seven appearances in helping his squad to a fourth-place finish.

In 2007–08, Richards played for C.B. Agüimes of the Junior League of Canaria. He also played in three games for Real Madrid's junior team at the Nike Junior International Tournament, averaging 15.3 points and 6.7 rebounds in 22.4 minutes.

== Professional career ==
=== Early years (2008–2011) ===
In 2008, Richards joined the junior program of Belgian club Belfius Mons-Hainaut. In Belgium's third division, he helped the squad go 16–8 in Group B. In March 2009, Richards made his debut in the Ethias League. During the 2008–09 season, he also played two games in the Nike Junior International Tournament for German club Brose Baskets, averaging 16.5 points, 11.5 rebounds and 1.0 blocks in 29.3 minutes. Richards later played two games at the 2009 U-18 European Championship for England, averaging 29.0 points and 13.0 rebounds.

For the 2009–10 season, Richards joined Gran Canaria and started the season with the team's junior squad, La Caja Gran Canaria, in the Spanish EBA. He averaged 10.3 points, 4.0 rebounds and 0.7 blocks in 18.4 minutes per game over three appearances. Following this three-game stint, he began suiting up for the senior squad, but never made it onto the court with Gran Canaria. In January 2010, he was loaned to Swiss club BBC Monthey for the rest of the 2009–10 season. He played six games for Monthey before separating his shoulder. He averaged 13.3 points, 5.2 rebounds and 0.8 blocks in 20.3 minutes.

On 24 June 2010, Richards was selected by the San Antonio Spurs with the 49th overall pick in the 2010 NBA draft. He did not join the Spurs for the 2010–11 season; instead, he spent the season recovering from two shoulder surgeries.

=== Europe and Asia (2011–present) ===
On 9 September 2011, Richards signed with Swiss club Lugano Tigers. He left the team in February 2012. Two months later, he signed with BC Sokhumi of the Georgian Superleague.

In July 2012, Richards joined the San Antonio Spurs for the 2012 NBA Summer League. On 6 November 2012, he signed with Polish club Asseco Prokom Gdynia. On 29 January 2013, he parted ways with Gdynia. Two weeks later, he signed with BC Zepter Vienna for the rest of the season. With Zepter Vienna, he won an Austrian League championship.

In July 2013, Richards re-joined the San Antonio Spurs for the 2013 NBA Summer League. He started the 2013–14 season with Dubai-based club Al Nasr, but returned to Europe in December 2013 and joined Greek club Ikaros Chalkidas for the rest of the season.

On 19 July 2014, Richards signed with Zepter Vienna, returning to the club for a second stint. His second stint lasted just five games, as he parted ways with the club on 21 October 2014. Three days later, he signed with Hungarian club BC Körmend for the rest of the season.

In April 2015, Richards moved to Iran where he joined Azad University Tehran. In June 2015, he signed with Chinese NBL side Guangxi Rhinos.

For the 2015–16 season, Richards returned to Iran to play for Shahrdari Gorgan. Following the Iranian season, he joined Lebanese club Sagesse. He then had a short stint with Al-Ahli in May 2016.

On 26 September 2016, Richards signed with the San Antonio Spurs for training camp. Three days later, he was waived by the Spurs. On 20 October 2016, Richards signed with Karpoš Sokoli in Macedonia. On 22 November 2016, he parted ways with Sokoli after appearing in four games. On 3 December 2016, he signed with Sanat Naft Abadan of the Iranian Super League.

On 9 March 2018, Richards signed with Hallmann Vienna of the Österreichische Basketball Bundesliga. On 26 April 2018, Richards was reported to have parted way with the team without playing a game due to shoulder injury.

On 12 February 2020, Richards signed for the Plymouth Raiders.

On 6 July 2020, Richards signed with the Phoenix Brussels of the Pro Basketball League.

On 28 November 2020, Richards signed with the Surrey Scorchers for the 2020–21 BBL season. This will be Richards second stint with the club in Great Britain.

In April 2021, Richards signed with Angolan club Petro de Luanda to play in the 2021 BAL season.

Since September 2021, Richards plays for Aomori Wat's in the Japanese B.League.

On 29 June 2022, Richards signed with Yamaguchi Patriots in the Japanese B.League.

In April 2023, it was announced Richards had joined Guinean club SLAC for the 2023 BAL season. However, he did not appear in any game for SLAC and was not on the opening day roster.

On 16 February 2024, Richards signed with the Shinagawa City of the B.League.

On 9 November 2024, Richards signed with the Terrafirma Dyip of the Philippine Basketball Association (PBA) as the team's import for the 2024–25 PBA Commissioner's Cup. On 3 December 2024, he was replaced by Brandon Edwards.

== International career ==
Born in the United Kingdom, Richards featured in 7 senior games for the Great Britain national team, before attempting to switch his allegiance to the Jamaica national team in 2012. Richards later featured for Great Britain in senior international games from 2017 to 2019.

== The Basketball Tournament ==
In summer 2016, Richards joined Overseas Elite to participate in ESPN's The Basketball Tournament. The team repeated as champions of the South region, and eventually went on to defend their title defeating Team Colorado and bringing home an increased $2 million prize.

He joined Ram Nation (VCU Alumni) for the 2018 ESPN's The Basketball Tournament.

== BAL career statistics ==
Legend
GP	Games played	GS	Games started	MPG	Minutes per game
FG%	Field goal percentage	3P%	3-point field goal percentage	FT%	Free throw percentage
RPG	Rebounds per game	APG	Assists per game	SPG	Steals per game
BPG	Blocks per game	PPG	Points per game	**Bold**	Career high

Year	Team	GP	GS	MPG	FG%	3P%	FT%	RPG	APG	SPG	BPG	PPG
2021	Petro de Luanda	6	0	17.4	.438	.500	.714	4.0	.8	1.2	.0	8.5
Career		6	0	17.4	.438	.500	.714	4.0	.8	1.2	.0	8.5
