= Gjio Bain =

Bahamian basketball player (born 1985)

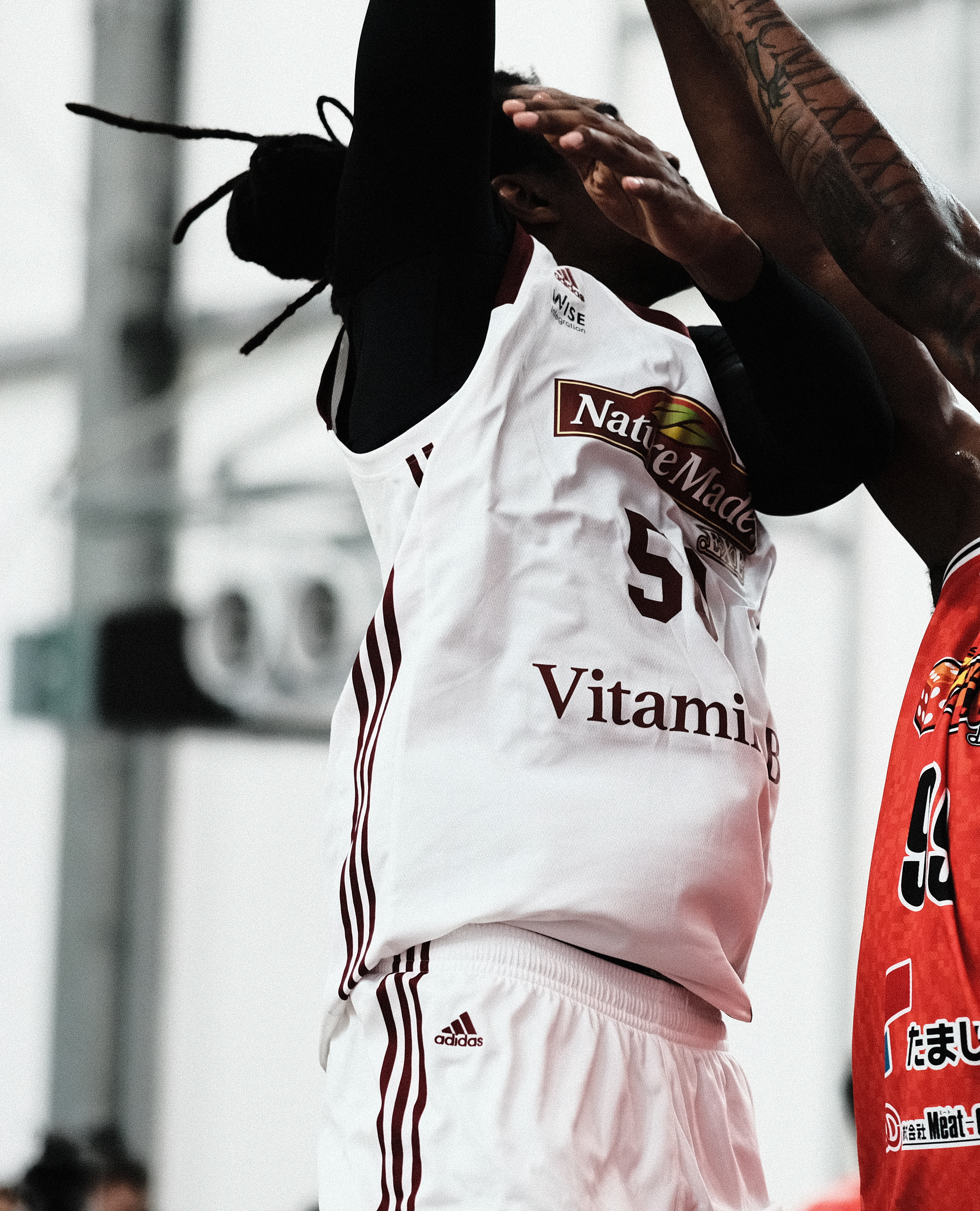

Personal information
- Born: July 15, 1985 (age 41) Nassau, Exuma, Bahamas
- Listed height: 7 ft 0 in (2.13 m)
- Listed weight: 225 lb (102 kg)

Career information
- High school: C.I. Gibson (Nassau, Exuma, Bahamas)
- College: Northeastern Junior College (2004-2006); Southern Mississippi (2006-2008)
- NBA draft: 2008: undrafted
- Playing career: 2008–2023
- Position: Center

Career history
- 2011-2012: Olympia Reign
- 2012-2014: Vancouver Volcanoes
- 2015-2016: Hiroshima Lightning
- 2016-2017: Bima Perkasa Jogjakarta
- 2017-2018: Tokyo Cinq Reves
- 2018: Kagoshima Rebnise
- 2018-2019: Iwate Big Bulls
- 2019-2020: Kanazawa Samuraiz
- 2020: San-en NeoPhoenix
- 2020-2021: Kanazawa Samuraiz
- 2021-2022: Shinagawa City
- 2022-2023: Tachikawa Dice

Gjio Bain (born July 15, 1985) is a Bahamian professional basketball player for San-en NeoPhoenix in Japan.
