= Nomoto =

Nomoto (written: 野本 or 野元) is a Japanese surname. Notable people with the surname include:

- Kei Nomoto (野本 圭, born 1984), Japanese baseball player
- Kengo Nomoto (野本 建吾, born 1992), Japanese basketball player
- Ken’ichi Nomoto (野本 憲一, born 1946), Japanese astrophysicist and astronomer
- Reizō Nomoto (野本 礼三, 1930–2006), Japanese voice actor
- Takeshi Nomoto (野元 勇志, born 1989), Japanese basketball player
- Yasuhiro Nomoto (野本 安啓, born 1983), Japanese footballer

== Fictional characters ==
- Yūya Nomoto (野本 裕也), a character in the manga series Killing Bites
