= Ralph Sampson (disambiguation) =

Ralph Sampson (born 1960) is an American former professional basketball player who is a member of the Naismith Memorial Basketball Hall of Fame.

Ralph Sampson may also refer to:

- Ralph Sampson III (born 1990), American former basketball player who played in the 2010s, son of the Hall of Famer
- Ralph Allan Sampson (1866–1939), British astronomer

== See also ==
- Ralph Simpson (born 1949), American basketball player who played in the 1970s
