= John Saintignon =

American sports coach and businessman (born 1965)

Personal information
- Born: May 6, 1965 (age 61) Nuevo Casas Grandes, Chihuahua, Mexico.

Career information
- College: UC Santa Cruz; UC San Diego
- Position: Point guard and shooting guard

Career history

Coaching
- 1992–1995: Mar Vista High School
- 1995–2001: Bonita Vista HS
- 2002–2003: Canyon del Oro HS
- 2003–2004: Desert Edge HS
- 2004–2007: Oregon State (asst.)
- 2007–2008: Caballeros de Culiacan
- 2008–2009: Stanislaus State (asst.)
- 2009–2010: Grant Union HS
- 2010–2011: Sitra Club
- 2012: Fuerza Guinda
- 2016: Culiacan Caballeros
- 2019–2020: Saitama Broncos
- 2021–2023: Yamaguchi Patriots

John Saintignon (born May 6, 1965) is a professional basketball coach. He served as head coach of the Saitama Broncos and Yamaguchi Patsfive in Japan. He was head coach of Sitra Club in Bahrain and Director of Basketball Operations and Assistant Coach for the Oregon State Beavers. He is the former CEO of the Interscholastic Licensing Company (ILC).

== Early life ==
Saintignon was born on May 6, 1965, in Nuevo Casas Grandes, Mexico. He was adopted when he was an infant and raised in Tucson, Arizona.

Saintignon played college basketball at the University of California, Santa Cruz, and holds the university's all-time scoring record. In 1985–86, he led NCAA college basketball in scoring, averaging 32.1 points per game. He later transferred to the University of California, San Diego in 1990, where he graduated with a degree in economics.

== Coaching career ==
Saintignon began his basketball coaching career at Mar Vista High School in Imperial Beach, California. He served as the varsity head coach for three seasons from 1992 to 1995, during which the team won a championship, its first since 1964.

From 1995 to 2001, he served as head coach at Bonita Vista High School in Chula Vista. The team finished the 1999 seasonal with a 30–5 record en route to its first CIF basketball title under his leadership. In 2002, he became head coach at Canyon del Oro High School, guiding the team to the state playoffs for three consecutive seasons. After three seasons with CDO, Saintignon moved to Phoenix, Arizona, to lead the program at the new Desert Edge High School. He joined Oregon State University (Pac-10 Conference) as director of basketball operations and assistant coach. He then became the head coach of Caballeros de Culiacán.

Saintignon returned to NCAA Division II as the lead assistant coach at Cal State Stanislaus University. He was part of the Warriors staff from 2008 to 2009.

Saintignon coached at Grant Union High School in Sacramento, California, with the team qualifying for the playoffs.

He coached the Caballeros de Culiacan in the CIBACOPA league for a second time in 2016, with the team reaching the playoffs.

For the 2019–2020 season, Saintignon coached the Saitama Broncos in Japan's B League, with the team on track for a playoff appearance before the season was canceled due to the COVID-19 pandemic. In 2021–2022, Saintignon served as the head coach of the newly established Yamaguchi Patsfive, the first professional basketball franchise in Yamaguchi Prefecture.

== Books ==
- Take Your Shot, Make Your Play!: A Coach's Key to Finding Success on and Off the Court, August 2018
- Shooting for the Impossible: A story of Family | A story of Faith, August 2025

== Personal life ==
Saintignon currently lives in Orange County, California with his wife and two sons.
