= Jordan Faison (basketball) =

American professional basketball player

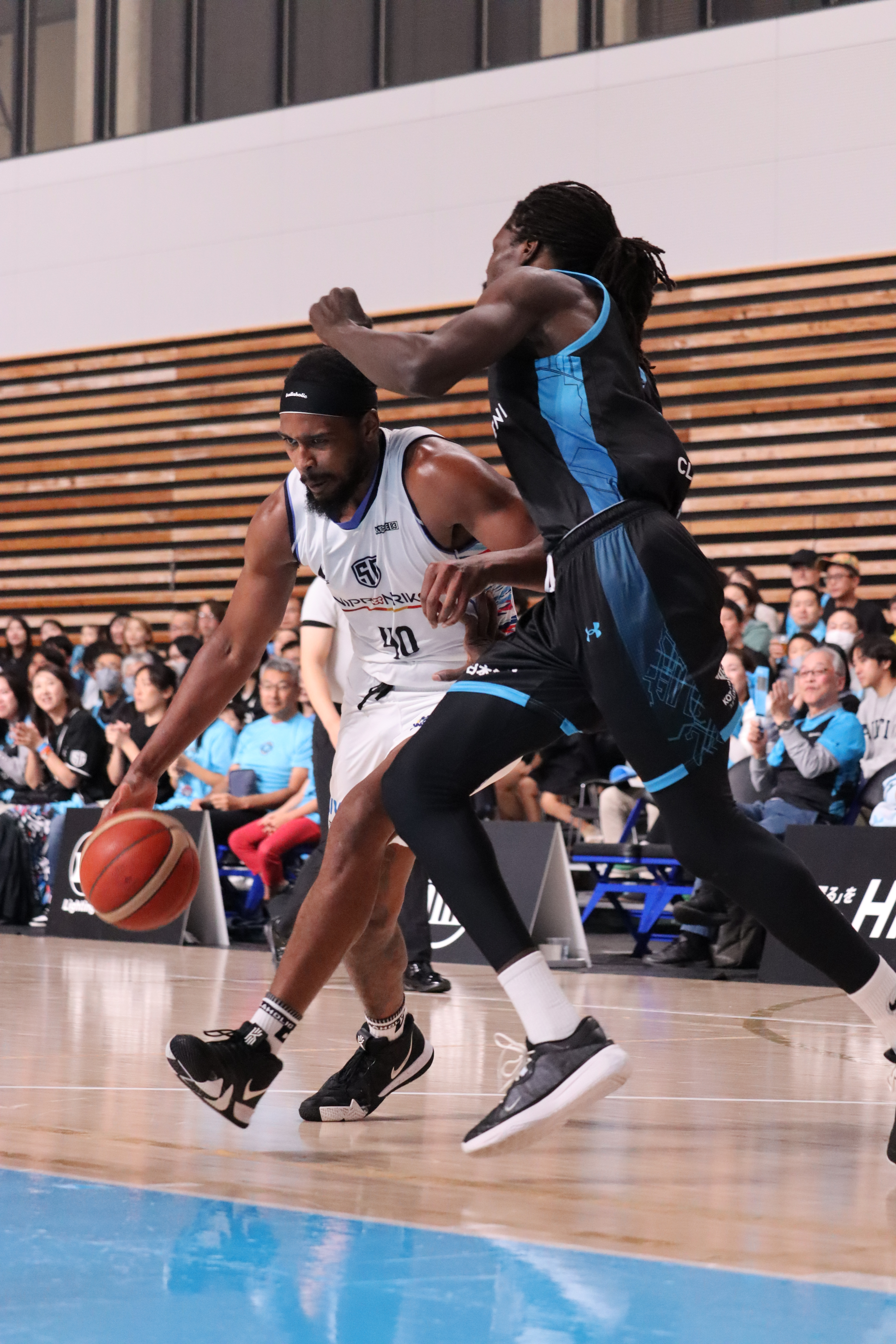

Free agent
- Position: Power forward

Personal information
- Born: October 17, 1994 (age 32) Lake Forest, California, U.S.
- Listed height: 6 ft 7 in (2.01 m)
- Listed weight: 225 lb (102 kg)

Career information
- High school: El Toro (El Toro, California)
- College: Cal Poly Pomona (2012–2016)
- NBA draft: 2016: undrafted
- Playing career: 2016–present

Career history
- 2016–2017: Uni-Riesen Leipzig
- 2017–2020: Tokyo Excellence
- 2020: Kyoto Hannaryz
- 2021: Fukushima Firebonds
- 2021–2022: Aisin Areions
- 2022–2023: Yokohama Excellence
- 2023–2024: Saitama Broncos
- 2024–2025: Shinagawa City Basketball Club

Career highlights
- B3 Blocks leader (2019)

Jordan Michael Faison (born October 17, 1994) is an American professional basketball player for Shinagawa City Basketball Club of the B.League.

On January 6, 2021, Faison signed with the Fukushima Firebonds of the B.League.

On July 26, 2024, Faison signed with the Shinagawa City Basketball Club of the B.League.
