= Yuji Funayama (basketball) =

Japanese basketball player

Yuji Funayama 船山裕士
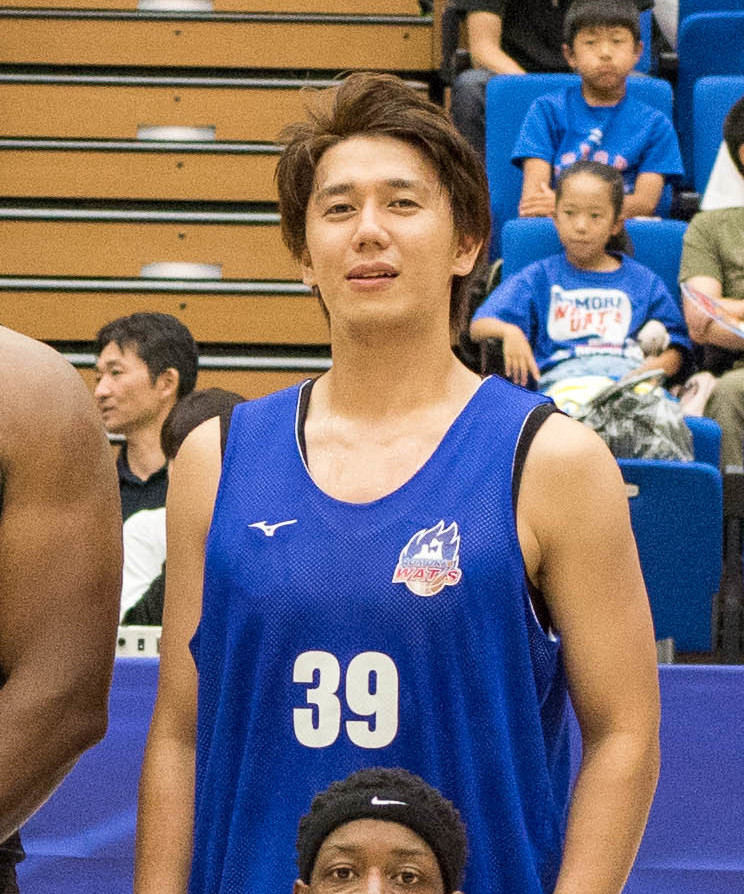

Personal information
- Born: July 13, 1992 (age 34) Katsuragi, Nara, Japan
- Listed height: 6 ft 2 in (1.88 m)
- Listed weight: 194 lb (88 kg)

Career information
- High school: Kansai University of Social Welfare Konko Toin High School (Ikuno, Osaka)
- College: Kyushu Sangyo University (2011-2015)
- Playing career: 2015–present
- Position: Power forward
- Number: 39

Career history
- 2015: Tokyo Cinq Rêves
- 2015–2016: Hiroshima Lightning
- 2017–2018: Akita Northern Happinets
- 2018-2019: Aomori Wat's
- 2019-2020: Bambitious Nara
- 2020-2021: Rizing Zephyr Fukuoka

Yuji Funayama (born July 13, 1992) is a Japanese professional basketball player who plays for Rizing Zephyr Fukuoka of the B.League in Japan. He was selected by the Tokyo Cinq Reves with the 12th overall pick in the 2015 bj League draft.

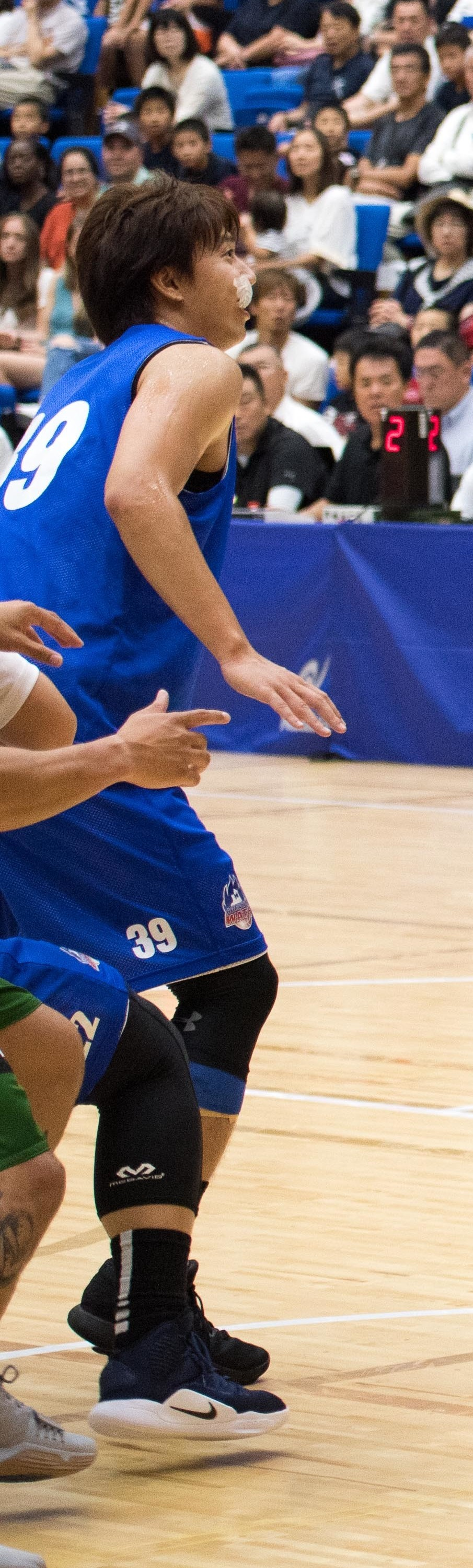
Funayama

== Career statistics ==
Legend
GP	Games played	GS	Games started	MPG	Minutes per game
FG%	Field goal percentage	3P%	3-point field goal percentage	FT%	Free throw percentage
RPG	Rebounds per game	APG	Assists per game	SPG	Steals per game
BPG	Blocks per game	PPG	Points per game	**Bold**	Career high

=== Regular season ===
Year	Team	GP	GS	MPG	FG%	3P%	FT%	RPG	APG	SPG	BPG	PPG
2015–16	Hiroshima L	37	27	25.8	.368	.280	.333	4.6	.6	.7	.4	4.1
2017–18	Akita	29	4	7.2	.219	.150	.667	.8	.4	.3	.1	.7
2018–19	Aomori	16	1	7.57	.429	.182	.333	1.4	.4	.38	.06	1.7
2018–19	Nara	7	0	4.09	.333	.000	.500	.9	.1	.14	.00	1.1
2019–20	Nara	15		6.7	.500	.500	.000	.8	.1	.3	.1	.6

=== Playoffs ===
Year	Team	GP	GS	MPG	FG%	3P%	FT%	RPG	APG	SPG	BPG	PPG
2017-18	Akita	1	0	1.16	.000	.000	.000	0	0	0	0	0

=== Early cup games ===
Year	Team	GP	GS	MPG	FG%	3P%	FT%	RPG	APG	SPG	BPG	PPG
2018	Aomori	1	0	0.10	.000	.000	.000	1.0	0.5	0.0	0	0
2019	Nara	2	0	1:51	.000	.000	.000	0.0	0.0	0.0	0	0
