= Kyushu Sangyo University =

Private university in Fukuoka, Japan

Coordinates: 33°40′11″N 130°26′41″E

- Kyūshū Sangyō Daigaku
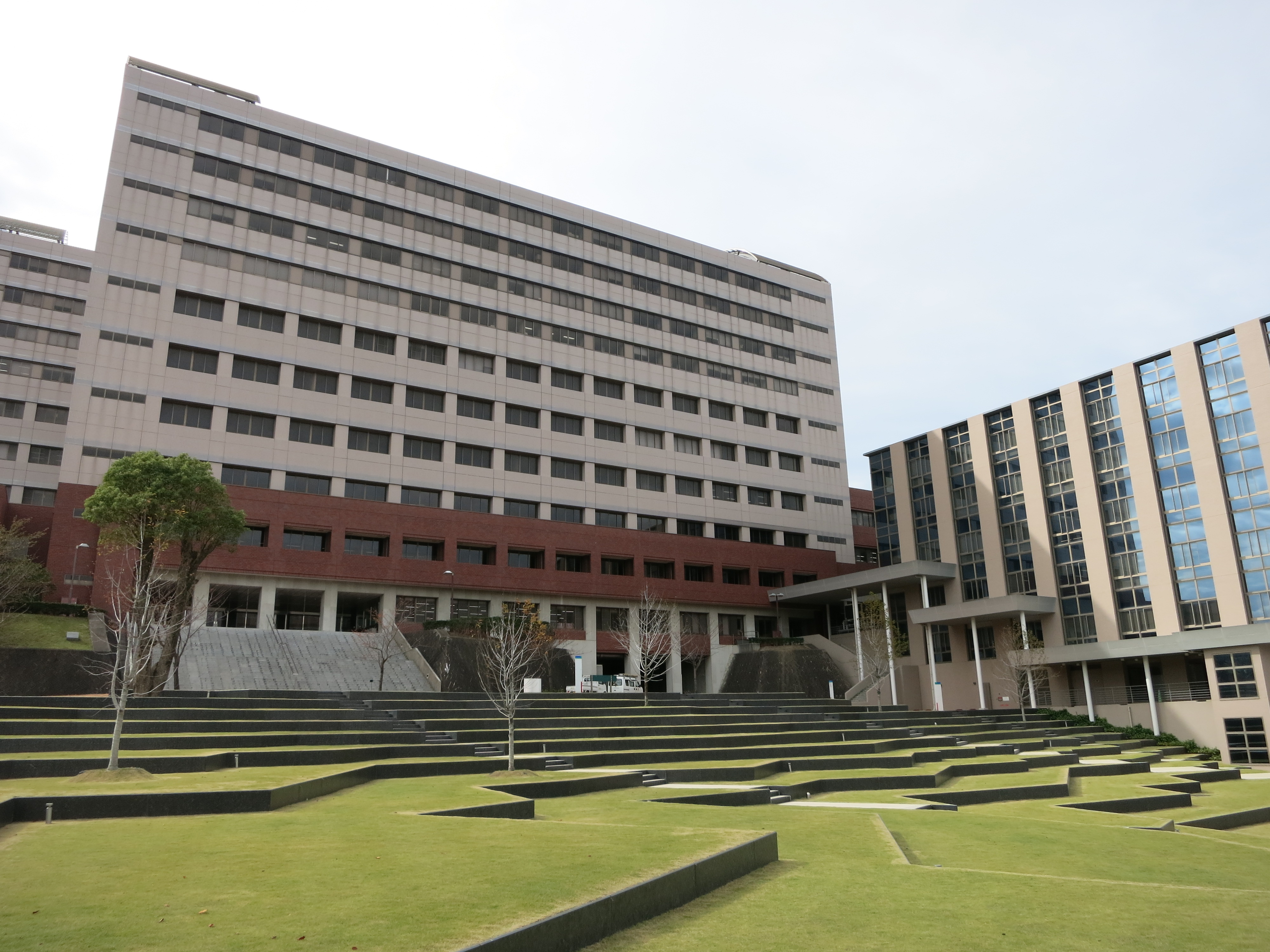
- Established: 1960
- Location: Fukuoka, Fukuoka, Japan
- Website: www.ip.kyusan-u.ac.jp

Kyushu Sangyo University (九州産業大学, Kyūshū Sangyō Daigaku) was founded in 1960 in Fukuoka City, and currently has twenty departments and six graduate schools. It is a private university.

== Undergraduate Faculties and departments ==
- Faculty of Economics
  - Department of Economics
- Faculty of Commerce
  - Department of Commerce
  - Department of Tourism Industry
- Evening School of Commerce
  - Department of Commerce
  - Department of Tourism Industry
- Faculty of Management
  - Department of International Management
  - Department of Industrial Management
- Faculty of Engineering
  - Department of Mechanical Engineering
  - Department of Electrical Engineering
  - Department of Applied Chemistry and Biochemistry
  - Department of Department of Civil and Urban Design Engineering
  - Department of Architecture
  - Department of Biorobotics
  - Department of Housing and Interior Design
- Faculty of Fine Arts
  - Department of Fine Art
  - Department of Craft Art
  - Department of Design
  - Department of Photography
- Faculty of International Studies of Culture
  - Department of International Studies of Culture
  - Department of Regional Studies of Culture
  - Department of Clinical Psychology
- Faculty of Information Science
  - Department of Information Science

== Teachers ==
- Ikkō Narahara (photographer)
- Shōji Ueda (photographer)

== Alumni ==
- Shunji Dodo (photographer)
- Tatsunori Fujie (basketball player)
- Yuji Funayama (basketball player)
- Park Joon-Kyung (footballer)
- Kōji Shiraishi (film director)
- Masashi Kishimoto (manga artist)
- Masaaki Yuasa (film director)
