= Morgan Hikaru Aiken =

Japanese-American basketball player

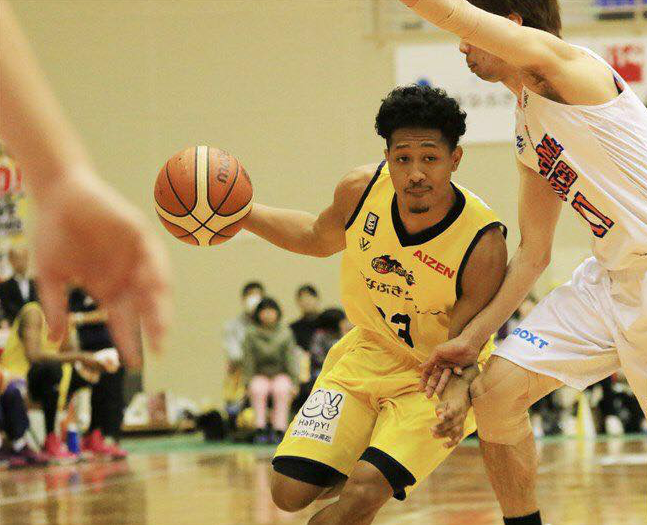
- Aiken with the Five Arrows (Former team)

Personal information
- Born: July 15, 1994 (age 32) Honolulu, Hawaii
- Listed height: 5 ft 8 in (1.73 m)
- Listed weight: 165 lb (75 kg)

Career information
- High school: Saint Paul Christian School, Guam
- College: Eastern University
- NBA draft: 2015: undrafted
- Playing career: 2015–2022
- Position: Point guard

Career history
- 2015–2016: Akita Northern Happinets
- 2016: Tokyo Cinq Rêves
- 2017: Five Arrows
- 2019–2021: Saitama Broncos
- 2021–2022: Yamaguchi Patriots
Medals
Men's Basketball
Representing Guam
Micronesian Games
Gold medal – first place	2014 Pohnpei	National Team

Morgan Hikaru Aiken 加藤 ひかる (born July 15, 1994) is a former Japanese-American professional basketball player from Guam in the B.League. Aiken is the first Guam high school graduate to sign a professional contract to play basketball overseas.

Aiken is the first player from Guam to play in the professional Japan Basketball League. Born in Hawaii, he attended high school in Guam, and played NCAA college basketball for Eastern University. Transferred to the University of Texas at El Paso the following year for an opportunity to walk on. However, was ineligible due to lack of credits. Aiken is a part of the Guam national basketball team winning the gold medal at the 2014 Micronesian Games. Also was sponsored by BoingVert and Adidas Japan after gaining popularity on Instagram and YouTube from posting dunking videos at 5'7.

== High school ==
Aiken was the only sophomore in 2010 to make the All-Island team (second team) in the Guam IIAAG High School League. In 2011 as a Junior, Aiken won the State Championship, was honored First Team All-Island, and also came in 2nd in the Slam Dunk Contest held at the Far East Tournament in Japan. Although projected to be the MVP of the league after his outstanding junior year, Aiken fractured his left foot 2 weeks prior to the start of his senior season. Playing only half the season, he still managed to be named to the Second Team All-Island. In 2012, Aiken graduated from Saint Paul Christian School. Following his graduation, he committed to Eastern University in Pennsylvania.

== Professional career ==
In 2015, Aiken signed a contract with the Akita Northern Happinets via an early entry process and began practicing with the team. However, with complications with the process, he signed with the Tokyo Cinq Rêves for the remainder of the season. The following season, Aiken signed with the Kagawa Five Arrows.

In 2021, Aiken signed with the Yamaguchi Patriots and was voted team captain by the organization, staff, and players. Aiken finished the season with almost a 4 to 1 assist-to-turnover ratio. Although offered a contract for the 2022–23 season, he chose to retire and move back to Guam.
