= Elias Neal =

American football player (born 2001)

No. 35 – New England Patriots
- Position: Linebacker
- Roster status: Practice squad

Personal information
- Born: September 11, 2001 (age 25); Memphis, Tennessee, U.S.
- Listed height: 6 ft 0 in (1.83 m)
- Listed weight: 221 lb (100 kg)

Career information
- High school: White Station (Memphis)
- College: Marshall (2019–2023)
- NFL draft: 2024: undrafted

Career history
- Los Angeles Rams (2024–2026); New England Patriots (2026–present)*
- * Offseason or practice squad member only

Awards and highlights
- Third-team All-Sun Belt (2023)
- Stats at Pro Football Reference

Elias Neal (born September 11, 2001) is an American professional football linebacker for the New England Patriots of the National Football League (NFL). He played college football for the Marshall Thundering Herd.

== Early life ==
Neal was born on September 11, 2001. From Memphis, Tennessee, he attended White Station High School there where he played running back and linebacker, recording 750 rushing yards and 12 touchdowns alsong with 95 tackles and two interceptions as a senior. He committed to play college football for the Marshall Thundering Herd as a two-star prospect.

== College career ==
Neal appeared in all 13 games as a true freshman in 2019, seeing action as backup linebacker and on special teams; he finished the season with 12 tackles and 0.5 tackles-for-loss (TFLs). In 2020, he started all 10 games while recording 75 tackles, 5.0 TFLs, 1.5 sacks and an interception, being named honorable mention All-Conference USA. He remained starter in 2021 and opened the season with Conference USA defensive player of the week honors, following an 11-tackle, three-sack performance against Navy. That year, he was again named honorable mention all-conference, after totaling 97 tackles, second on the team, seven TFLs and 5.5 sacks.

In 2022, Neal was named honorable mention All-Sun Belt Conference (SBC) after posting a team-leading 98 tackles, 9.5 TFLs and three sacks. He returned for a final season in 2023, as all players were granted an extra year of eligibility due to the COVID-19 pandemic. He was Marshall's 2023 leader with 93 tackles, also recording 10.5 TFLs and two sacks. He was named a Group of Five All-American and a third-team All-SBC selection. He ended his collegiate career having recorded 375 tackles, 32.5 TFLs, 12 sacks, five interceptions and five fumble recoveries. His tackles total and TFLs total both placed in the top 20 in school history. He participated in the Hula Bowl all-star game after the season.

== Professional career ==
Pre-draft measurables
Height	Weight	Arm length	Hand span	Wingspan	40-yard dash	10-yard split	20-yard split	20-yard shuttle	Vertical jump	Broad jump	Bench press
5 ft 11 3/4 in (1.82 m)	222 lb (101 kg)	31 1/4 in (0.79 m)	9 5/8 in (0.24 m)	6 ft 3 1/2 in (1.92 m)	4.87 s	1.67 s	2.71 s	4.39 s	35.0 in (0.89 m)	9 ft 8 in (2.95 m)	19 reps
All values from Pro Day

=== Los Angeles Rams ===
After going unselected in the 2024 NFL draft, Neal signed with the Los Angeles Rams as an undrafted free agent. He made the team's initial 53-man roster for the 2024 season. He played in five games before being waived on October 21, 2024, and re-signed to the practice squad. Neal signed a reserve/future contract with the Rams on January 20, 2025.

On August 26, 2025, Neal was waived by the Rams as part of final roster cuts and re-signed to the practice squad the next day. Prior to the Rams' Week 6 game at the Baltimore Ravens, Neal was elevated to the team's active roster. On January 27, 2026, he signed a reserve/futures contract with Los Angeles.

On August 30, 2026, Neal was waived by the Rams as a part of final roster cuts; he was re-signed to the team's practice squad the following day. On October 27, he was released.

=== New England Patriots ===
On November 3, 2026, Neal was signed to the New England Patriots practice squad.
