= Takeshi Nomoto =

Japanese basketball player

Takeshi Nomoto 野元勇志
Personal information
- Born: August 20, 1989 (age 37) Miyazaki Prefecture
- Listed height: 5 ft 7 in (1.70 m)
- Listed weight: 154 lb (70 kg)

Career information
- High school: Kobayashi (Kobayashi, Miyazaki)
- College: Daito Bunka University
- Position: Guard

Career history
- 2012-2014: Underdog
- 2013-2014: Japan men's national 3x3 team
- 2014-2015: Hiroshima Lightning
- 2016: Tokyo Cinq Reves

Takeshi Nomoto (野元 勇志, Nomoto Takeshi; born August 20, 1989), nicknamed Ta-bo, is a Japanese former professional basketball player who played for Tokyo Cinq Reves of the bj League in Japan. He also played for Japan men's national 3x3 team.

== Career statistics ==
Legend
GP	Games played	GS	Games started	MPG	Minutes per game
FG%	Field goal percentage	3P%	3-point field goal percentage	FT%	Free throw percentage
RPG	Rebounds per game	APG	Assists per game	SPG	Steals per game
BPG	Blocks per game	PPG	Points per game	**Bold**	Career high

=== Regular season ===
Year	Team	GP	GS	MPG	FG%	3P%	FT%	RPG	APG	SPG	BPG	PPG
2015-16	Hiroshima L	10	0	12.0	.214	.150	.750	0.8	1.2	0.8	0.0	3.3
2015-16	Tokyo CR	24	1	14.5	.324	.185	1.000	1.1	1.5	0.8	0.0	2.3
Career		34	1	13.8	.276	.170	.833	1.0	1.4	0.8	0.0	2.6
