= Robert Sampson (basketball) =

American basketball player (born 1992)

Free agent
- Position: Power forward

Personal information
- Born: June 23, 1992 (age 34) Sacramento, California, U.S.
- Listed height: 6 ft 8 in (2.03 m)
- Listed weight: 224 lb (102 kg)

Career information
- High school: Bullis School (Potomac, Maryland)
- College: East Carolina (2010–2013); Georgia Tech (2014–2015)
- NBA draft: 2015: undrafted
- Playing career: 2015; 2021–present

Career history
- 2015: Atenas
- 2016: KK Mornar Bar
- 2020: West Adelaide Bearcats
- 2020: CSM Focșani
- 2021-2022: Yamaguchi Patriots
- 2022: Earthfriends Tokyo Z
- 2022-2023: Tokyo Hachioji Bee Trains
- 2023: Yamaguchi Patriots
- 2023: Nha Trang Dolphins

Robert Alan Sampson (born June 23, 1992) is an American professional basketball player. He is the son of Hall of Fame player Ralph Sampson and the younger brother of Ralph Sampson III.
