= Marvin Williams (basketball, born 1993) =

American basketball player

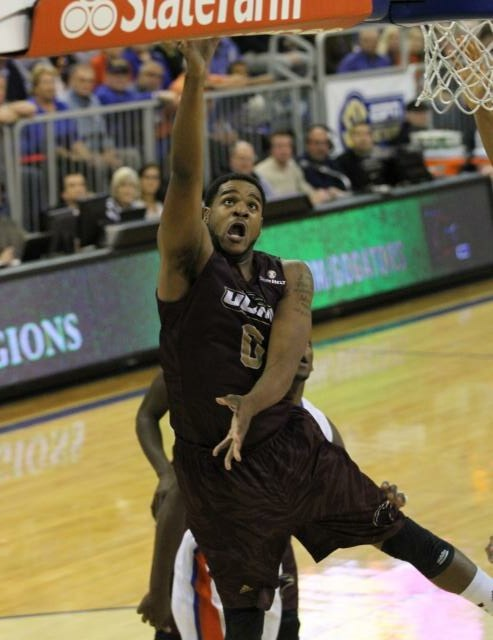
- Williams in November 2014

Personal information
- Born: August 28, 1993 (age 32) Memphis, Tennessee, U.S.
- Listed height: 6 ft 8 in (2.03 m)
- Listed weight: 245 lb (111 kg)

Career information
- High school: White Station (Memphis, Tennessee)
- College: Lipscomb (2011–2012); Northwest Florida State (2012–2013); Louisiana–Monroe (2013–2015)
- NBA draft: 2015: undrafted
- Playing career: 2015–2016
- Position: Center

Career history
- 2015–2016: Tokyo Cinq Rêves
- 2016: Gladstone Port City Power

Marvin D. Williams Jr. (born August 28, 1993) is an American former professional basketball player. He played two years of college basketball for Louisiana–Monroe before playing a year of professional basketball in Japan and Australia.

== High school career ==
Williams attended White Station High School in Memphis, Tennessee. During his four-year high school career, he helped White Station finish as Class AAA state tournament semi-finalists as a senior, state runners-up as a junior, state champions as a sophomore, and state runners-up as a freshman. As a senior in 2010–11, he averaged 12.2 points and 8.0 rebounds per game and earned All-Region Team honors.

== College career ==
As a freshman at Lipscomb in 2011–12, Williams appeared in 24 games and averaged 4.1 points and 3.1 rebounds per game. He missed four games in February 2012 due to a knee injury, and was then suspended from the team permanently. He was later dismissed from the team by the coach.

Williams' sophomore season was spent playing at Northwest Florida State College. He played 32 games with 24 starts during the 2012–13 season, shooting 53.7 percent from the field and averaging 6.1 points and 4.8 rebounds per game. On January 5, 2013, he recorded a career-high 17 points and 13 rebounds in a win over Gulf Coast State College.

As a junior at Louisiana–Monroe in 2013–14, Williams led the team with 23 blocks, finishing top-10 in the SBC, and averaged 8.5 points and 4.8 rebounds in 25 games (21 starts). He also shot 48.6 percent from the field (89-of-183), good for top-15 in the league. During the season, he tallied a pair of double-doubles with 13 points and 10 rebounds against Northwestern State on November 21, and 11 points and 13 rebounds against Arkansas State on March 6.

As a senior in 2014–15, Williams appeared in 21 of the Warhawks' first 22 games of the season before missing the last 16 games due to a season-ending shoulder injury. In those 21 games (16 starts), he averaged 8.5 points and 4.7 rebounds per game. On January 12, 2015, he was named the Sun Belt Conference Player of the Week and Co-Louisiana Sports Writers Association (LSWA) Player of the Week after leading the team to a 3–0 record and going 26-of-33 (.798) from the field with 20.7 points and 8.7 rebounds per game. During that week, he had two 22-point games, a career high.

== Professional career ==
=== Japan (2015–2016) ===
On November 13, 2015, Williams signed with the Tokyo Cinq Rêves of the Basketball Japan League. He had a game with 16 points and 16 rebounds, and another with 35 points. On January 29, 2016, he parted ways the Cinq Reves. In 14 games, he averaged 12.2 points, 7.5 rebounds, 1.1 steals and 1.1 blocks per game.

=== Australia (2016) ===
On March 10, 2016, Williams signed with the Gladstone Port City Power for the 2016 Queensland Basketball League season. He had three double-doubles and scored 20 points or more six times, including having 27 points and 11 rebounds on June 3 against the Townsville Heat and 21 points and 12 rebounds on July 23 against the Rockhampton Rockets. He missed three games in June with a knee injury. In 13 games for the Power, he averaged 17.7 points, 6.8 rebounds and 1.1 blocks per game.

=== Austria (2016) ===
In August 2016, Williams moved to Austria and joined BC Hallmann Vienna. He was later released after failing the try-out.
