= Kenichi Kawachi =

Japanese basketball coach

Personal information
- Born: February 16, 1965 (age 61) Kanagawa Prefecture

Career information
- High school: Yokosuka (Yokosuka, Kanagawa)
- College: Yokohama National University
- Position: Head coach

Career history

Coaching
- 1987-1994: Hasse HS
- 1994-2006: Zushi HS
- 2006-2012: Okusu HS
- 1992-1999: Kanagawa Prefecture
- 2015-2017: Tokyo Cinq Reves

Kenichi Kawachi (河内 健一, Kawachi Kenichi) is the former head coach of the Tokyo Cinq Reves in the Japanese B.League.

== Head coaching record ==
Legend
Regular season	G	Games coached	W	Games won	L	Games lost	W–L %	Win–loss %
Playoffs	PG	Playoff games	PW	Playoff wins	PL	Playoff losses	PW–L %	Playoff win–loss %

Team	Year	G	W	L	W–L%	Finish	PG	PW	PL	PW–L%	Result
Tokyo Cinq Reves	2015-16	52	5	47	.096	12th in Eastern	-	-	-	–	-
Tokyo Cinq Reves	2016-17	42	14	28	.333	5th in B3	10	4	6	.400	4th in Final stage
