= DeAndre Abram =

American basketball player (born 1997)

Personal information
- Born: June 1, 1997 (age 29) Carrollton, Texas, U.S.
- Listed height: 6 ft 8 in (2.03 m)
- Listed weight: 204 lb (93 kg)

Career information
- High school: Creekview (Carrollton, Texas)
- College: George Mason University (2015–2017); University of Wisconsin Milwaukee (2017–2020)
- NBA draft: 2021: undrafted
- Playing career: 2020–present
- Position: Small forward

Career history
- 2020-2021: Team FOG Naestved
- 2021-2022: MBK Handlová
- 2022-2023: Apollon Limassol B.C.
- 2023-2024: Yamaguchi Patsfive
- 2024: Kanazawa Samuraiz
- 2025: Tachikawa Dice

Career highlights
- All-Japanese B.League D3 Second Team (2024); All-Slovak Basketball League Honorable Mention (2022)

DeAndre Shakur Abram (born June 1, 1997) is an American professional basketball player who last played with Tachikawa Dice. He played college basketball for George Mason University and University of Wisconsin Milwaukee.

== Early life and high school ==
Abram played high school basketball at Creekview High School where he led his team to its first playoff win in 12 years as a senior. He averaged 16.9 points per game and was named the District 11-5A Offensive Player of the Year. Both of his parents played sports at Texas College. His mom was on the volleyball team and his dad played basketball.

== College career ==
=== George Mason University (2015–2017) ===
In June 2015, Coach Dave Paulsen announced the addition of four newcomers to George Mason University for the Fall of 2015 with Abram being one of the new additions. He joined Danny Dixon, Otis Livingston II and Kameron Murrell.

On December 19, 2015, Abram had his career high of 24 points to lead all scorers in a game against Longwood University. On December 21, he picked up his first Atlantic 10 Conference weekly honor by earning A-10 Co-Rookie of the Week. He shared the honor with Joseph Chartouny of Fordham University. On December 22nd, for a second straight game, Abram set a new career high by having 27 points and had his first career double-double with 10 rebounds against Wagner College. For the second consecutive week, Abram earned Atlantic 10 Conference Men's Basketball Rookie of the Week on December 28th.

On March 24, 2017, Abram asked for and was granted release from the team and was eligible to transfer to another program.

=== University of Wisconsin Milwaukee (2017–2020) ===
In October 2017, Coach Pat Baldwin announced that Abram had transferred into his program and signed to play with University of Wisconsin Milwaukee. He would have to sit out the 2017–2018 season and have two seasons of eligibility remaining.

On November 10, 2018, in a game against University of North Dakota Abram recorded his second career double-double with 12 points and 12 rebounds. At two games, his statline was the quickest double-double for a Milwaukee newcomer since James Haarsma went for 15 points and 12 rebounds in his second game in uniform back in 2011–2012. On December 17, 2018, Abram was named the Horizon League Player of the Week. He led the team to a 2-0 week with back to back double-doubles while averaging 22.5 points and 10.5 rebounds in the pair of games. This award was the first for him and the first for a Panther since December 2015. He was also ranked third in the Horizon League in scoring, second in rebounding and sixth in both field goal percentage and 3-point field goal percentage. In January 2019, Abram had a career high of 31 points against University of Detroit Mercy. In January 2019, Abram had a career-high 16 rebounds to lead the team to a win over UIC.

In January 2020 against Youngstown State Abram and his teammate Josh Thomas became the first teammates to record double-doubles in the same game in nearly four seasons. In February 2020, Abram accomplished his 500th rebound of his college career in a game against Youngstown State.

== Professional career ==
=== MBK Banik Handlova (2021–2022) ===
On August 3, 2021, Abram signed with MBK Handlová for the 2021–2022 season. During the 2020–2021 season, he had been with Team FOG Naestved but left the team in November 2020 after 9 games.

=== BC Apollon Limassol (2022–2023) ===
On July 28, 2022, Abram signed with Apollon Limassol B.C. for the season.

=== Yamaguch Pats Five (2023–2024) ===
On June 29, 2023, Abram signed a contract with Yamaguchi Patsfive for the 2023–2024 season. On May 1, 2024, the team announced that Abram would be listed on the B.League Free Agent List.

At the end of the 2023–2024 season, Abram was named to the All-Japanese B.League D3 Second Team.

=== Kanazawa Samuraiz (2024) ===
On July 11, 2024, Abram signed with Kanazawa Samuraiz for the 2024–2025 season. He joined the team after playing with the Yamaguchi Patsfive and averaged 19.4 points. On December 13th, the team, in mutual agreement, terminated Abrams contract. He played for the team throughout the Emperor's Cup, preseason, and regular season. After his injury, he was placed on the injury list and was aiming to return to the court but the team released him to strengthen the team.

=== Tachikawa Dice (2025) ===
On January 24, 2025, Abram signed a new contract with Tachikawa Dice. February 7, 2025, Abram's contract with Tachikawa Dice was terminated by mutual consent. He would be listed on the Free Agent List.
