= Shoya Uchimura =

Japanese basketball player

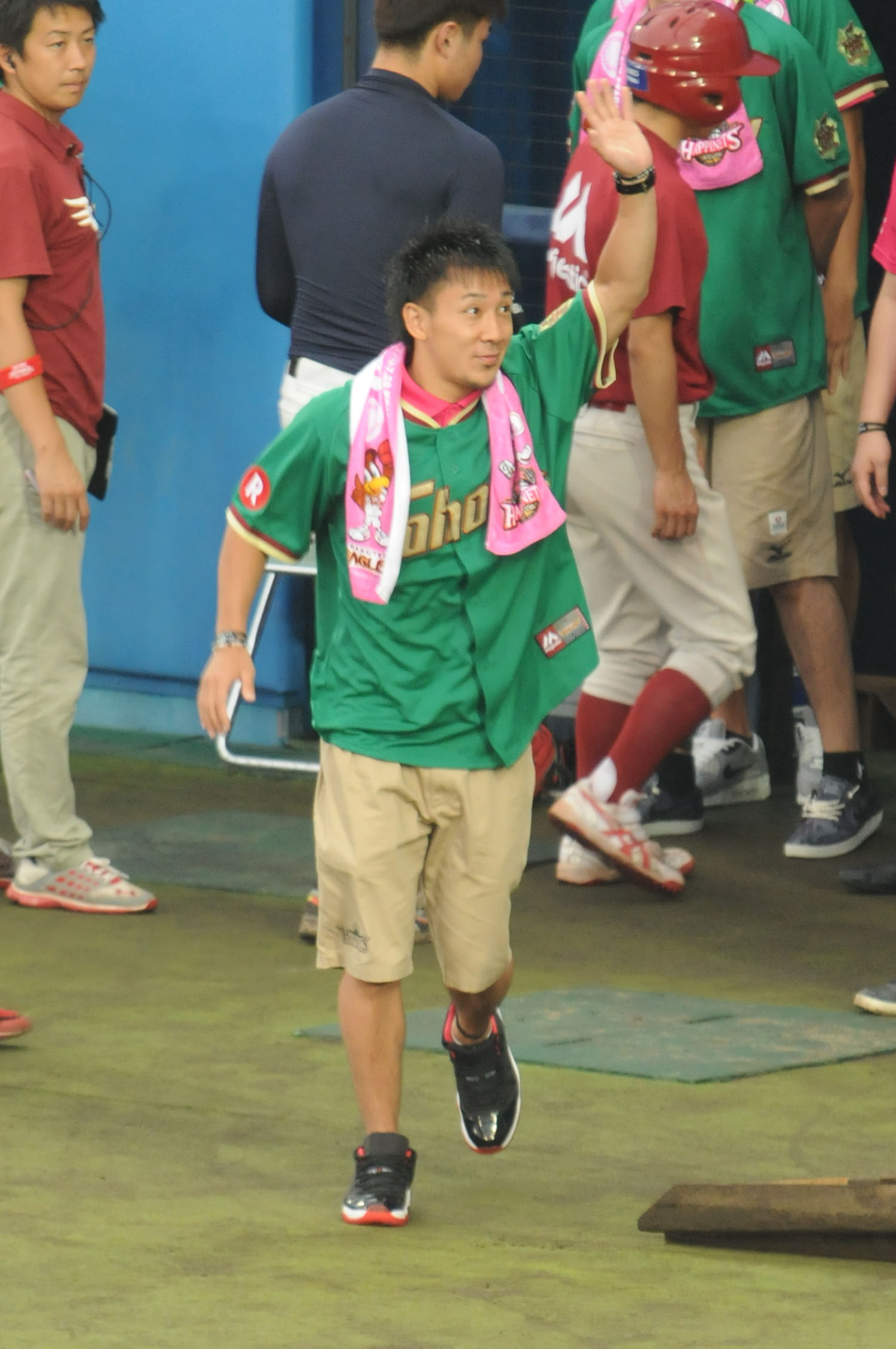
- Uchimura at Komachi Stadium in 2015

Akita Northern Happinets
- Position: School coach
- League: B.League

Personal information
- Born: December 16, 1990 (age 35) Miyakonojo, Miyazaki, Japan
- Listed height: 5 ft 9 in (1.75 m)
- Listed weight: 154 lb (70 kg)

Career information
- High school: Nobeoka Gakuen (Nobeoka, Miyazaki)
- College: National Institute of Fitness and Sports in Kanoya (2009–2012)
- Playing career: 2013–present

Career history
- 2013–2014: Tokyo Cinq Rêves
- 2014-2016: Akita Northern Happinets

Career highlights
- Japanese High School champions (2008)

Shoya Uchimura (内村祥也, Uchimura Shoya; born 16 December 1990) is a Japanese former professional basketball player who played for Akita Northern Happinets of the bj league in Japan.

== Stats ==
Legend
GP	Games played	GS	Games started	MPG	Minutes per game
FG%	Field goal percentage	3P%	3-point field goal percentage	FT%	Free throw percentage
RPG	Rebounds per game	APG	Assists per game	SPG	Steals per game
BPG	Blocks per game	PPG	Points per game	**Bold**	Career high

Year	Team	GP	GS	MPG	FG%	3P%	FT%	RPG	APG	SPG	BPG	PPG
2013-14	Tokyo CR	41	2	12	27.7	19.0	70.0	1.0	1.2	0.5	0	1.8
2014-15	Akita	38	4	9.3	38.2	16.7	61.9	1.0	1.6	0.3	0	1.7
2015-16	Akita	25	0	7.4	33.3	50.0	54.5	0.8	1.2	0.1	0	1.3
Totals		104	6	9.9	32.2	25.7	63.5	0.9	1.3	0.4	0	1.7

== Trivia ==
He is good at singing and sometimes serves as a prefectural anthem performer.
