= Hayden Koval =

American basketball player (born 1997)

No. 25 – Shinagawa City
- Position: Center
- League: B.League

Personal information
- Born: March 8, 1997 (age 29) Prosper, Texas, U.S.
- Listed height: 7 ft 1 in (2.16 m)
- Listed weight: 220 lb (100 kg)

Career information
- High school: Link Year Preparatory School (Branson, Missouri)
- College: Central Arkansas (2017–2020); UNC Greensboro (2020–2021); Cincinnati (2021–2022)
- NBA draft: 2022: undrafted
- Playing career: 2022–present

Career history
- 2022–2023: BK Iskra Svit
- 2023–present: Shinagawa City

Career highlights
- B3 League blocks leader (2024); 3× Southland All-Defensive team (2018–2020)

Hayden Koval (born March 8, 1997) is an American professional basketball player for Shinagawa City of the B3 League. His position is center. Koval is from Prosper, Texas in the United States.

== College Career (2017–2022) ==
=== University of Central Arkansas (2017–2020) ===
During the 2017–18 season at the University of Central Arkansas, Hayden Koval had a standout freshman year. Starting 30 of 34 games, he averaged 8.7 points, 5.3 rebounds, and set a school record with 105 blocks. His most notable game was against Houston Baptist, where he posted a triple-double with 17 points, 10 rebounds, and 11 blocks—the third in school history. His achievements earned him the Freshman of the Year title.

In the 2018–19 season, Hayden Koval started all 33 games for the University of Central Arkansas, averaging 12.5 points, 6.3 rebounds, and 2.2 blocks per game. He achieved career highs in blocked shots and made 39 three-pointers, shooting 47.8% overall. A highlight of his season was a game with 22 points, 13 rebounds, and 8 blocks. His efforts earned him spots on the SLC All-Academic and All-Defensive TeamsIn the 2018–19 season, Hayden Koval started all 33 games for the University of Central Arkansas, averaging 12.5 points, 6.3 rebounds, and 2.2 blocks per game. He achieved career highs in blocked shots and made 39 three-pointers, shooting 47.8% overall. A highlight of his season was a game with 22 points, 13 rebounds, and 8 blocks. His efforts earned him spots on the SLC All-Academic and All-Defensive Teams, as well as recognition on the Google Cloud Academic All-District Team for his academic excellence., as well as recognition on the Google Cloud Academic All-District Team for his academic excellence.

In the 2019-20 season, Hayden Koval played in all 31 games, averaging 12.2 points, a team-high 7.6 rebounds, and 3.1 blocks per game. His block total ranked first in the Southland Conference (SLC) and fourth in the entire NCAA. He recorded a career-high 23 points against Houston Baptist, 14 rebounds against Southeastern Louisiana, and 8 assists against Cal Baptist. Additionally, he made 31 three-pointers and recorded double-digit blocks in 25 games.Named to the Southland Conference All-Academic men's basketball team for the second consecutive year.

=== University of North Carolina at Greensboro (2020–2021) ===
In the 2020-21 season, Hayden Koval played for the University of North Carolina at Greensboro (UNCG), averaging 19.7 minutes and 7.1 points per game. He led the Southern Conference (SoCon) in blocked shots and ranked 26th nationally with 2.2 blocks per game. Over his career, he accumulated 337 career blocks, ranking 48th in NCAA history, and 65 blocks in a single season, which ranked 11th in the country. Koval recorded a career-high 17 points against Winthrop and a season-best 8 rebounds against VMI. He also made 26 three-pointers during the season.

=== University of Cincinnati (2021–2022) ===
In the 2021-22 season, Hayden Koval played for the University of Cincinnati, appearing in 33 games and averaging 12.1 minutes, 3.1 points, and 3.0 rebounds per game. Notably, he hit a crucial three-pointer against Georgia and made two three-pointers in a game against Arkansas. He recorded a season-high 13 points in a game against Wichita and blocked three shots in a game against Evansville. A total of 363 blocks in college ties for 45th place all-time. This number surpasses the 354 blocks recorded by Dikembe Mutombo, who won the NBA block title three times.

== Professional career ==
=== BK Iskra Svit / Slovakia League (2022–2023) ===
In the 2022-23 season, Hayden Koval signed with BK Iskra Svit in the Slovak Basketball League. He played in 35 games, averaging 14.1 points, 8.9 rebounds, and 2.8 blocks per game. receive a Hoops Agents Player of the Week award for round 21.

=== Shinagawa City / B3 League (2023–present) ===
In the 2023-24 season, Hayden Koval signed with Shinagawa City, marking his debut in the B.League.

On February 11, 2024, in a game against Veertien Mie, Hayden Koval recorded 12 points, 9 rebounds, and 9 blocks, contributing to a 79-73 victory. He also won the B3 League Block Leader title for the 2023-2024 season with a record-breaking average of 3.10 blocks per game, the highest in B3 League history (including B1 and B2).

2024-25 Season (2nd Year) Scored a career-high 32 points in the game against Kanazawa on October 17, 2024. Achieved a total of 200 career blocks in the B.League during the game against Hachioji on October 25, 2024. Recorded a career-high 26 rebounds in a match against Saitama on November 21, 2024.

Hayden Koval is currently a member of Shinagawa City in the B3 League.

== Awards ==
- B.League 2023-2024 Season Block Leader (3.10 blocks per game)

== Off the Court ==
His consistent effort and strong faith, both on and off the court, were highly regarded, and at the University of Cincinnati, he was nicknamed "Slim Preacher."

== Professional Career Statistics ==
Legend
GP	Games played	GS	Games started	MPG	Minutes per game
FG%	Field goal percentage	3P%	3-point field goal percentage	FT%	Free throw percentage
RPG	Rebounds per game	APG	Assists per game	SPG	Steals per game
BPG	Blocks per game	PPG	Points per game	**Bold**	Career high

Year	Team	GP	GS	MPG	FG%	3P%	FT%	RPG	APG	SPG	BPG	PPG
SVK-1 2022-23	BK Iskra Svit	28	-	36.4	58.7%	29.2%	84.2%	8.9	1.6	0.9	2.5	14.1
B3 2023-24	Shinagawa City	51	48	30.1	53.5%	41.9%	74.5%	8.7	1.6	0.7	3.1	10.6

== College Statistics ==
Year	Team	GP	GS	MPG	FG%	3P%	FT%	RPG	APG	SPG	BPG	PPG
2017–18	Central Arkansas	34	30	25.2	45.4%	33.0%	62.7%	5.3	0.9	0.4	3.1	8.7
2018–19	Central Arkansas	33	33	28.9	47.8%	36.1%	80.2%	6.3	1.1	0.4	2.2	12.5
2019–20	Central Arkansas	31	31	32.8	45.9%	32.6%	73.1%	7.6	1.5	0.6	3.1	12.2
2020–21	UNC Greensboro	30	9	19.6	46.8%	31.3%	79.6%	3.8	0.5	0.3	2.2	7.0
2021–22	Cincinnati	33	2	12.1	37.2%	26.2%	66.7%	3.0	0.3	0.2	0.8	3.1
