= Atsushi Kanazawa =

Japanese basketball coach

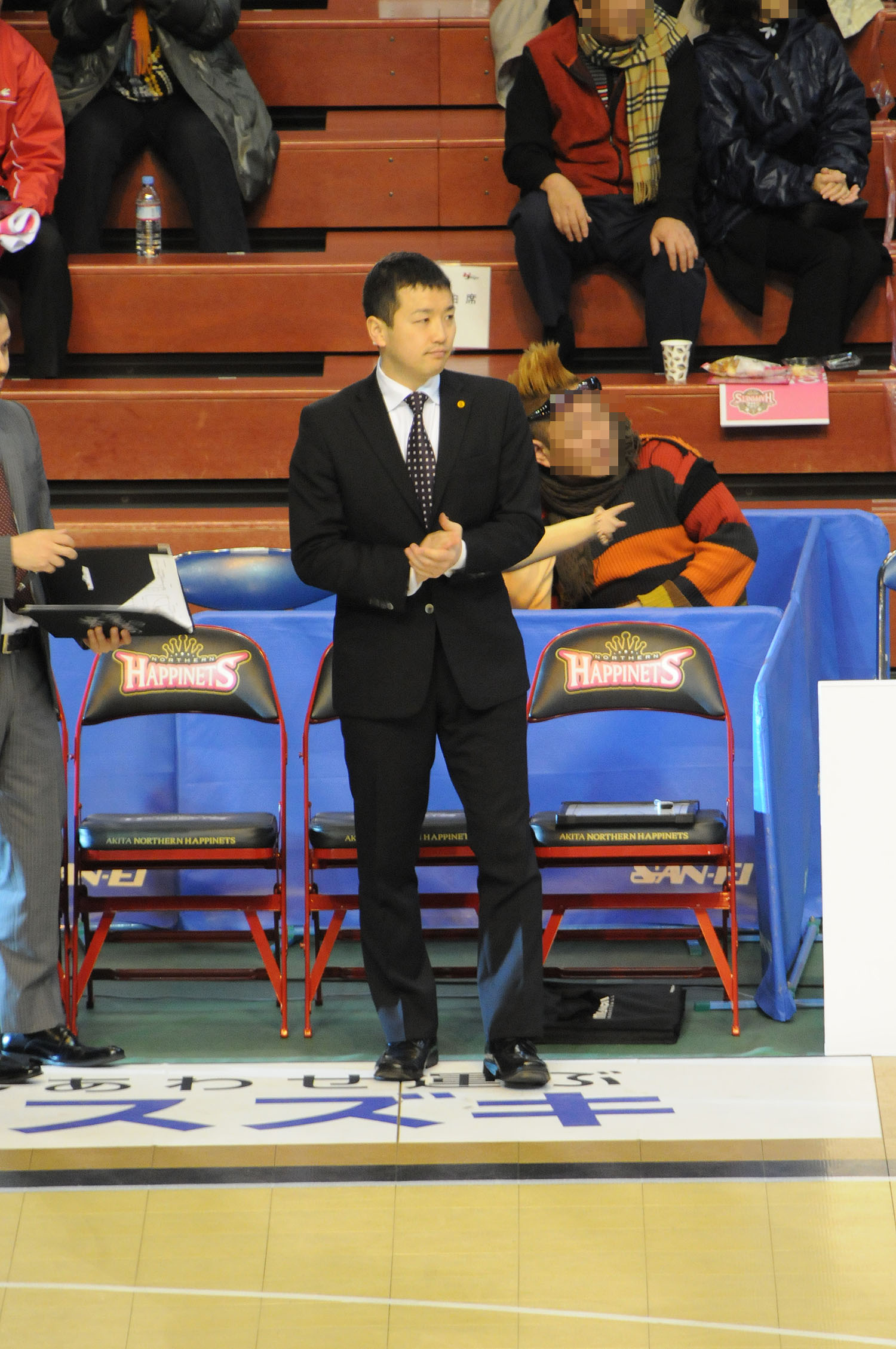

Rizing Zephyr Fukuoka
- Position: Head coach
- League: B.League

Personal information
- Born: April 2, 1978 (age 48) Chiba Prefecture

Career information
- High school: Sakura (Sakura, Chiba)
- College: University of Tsukuba

Career history

Coaching
- 2000-2003: Jordan team (asst)
- 2006-2007: University of Tsukuba (asst)
- 2007-2009: Rizing Fukuoka (asst)
- 2009-2010: Takamatsu Five Arrows (asst)
- 2010-2011: Takamatsu Five Arrows
- 2012-2013: Rizing Fukuoka
- 2013-2016: TGI D-Rise/Yamagata Wyverns
- 2016-xxxx: Rizing Zephyr Fukuoka

Career highlights

Atsushi Kanazawa (金澤篤志, Kanazawa Atsushi) is the former head coach of the Rizing Zephyr Fukuoka in the Japanese B.League.

== Head coaching record ==
Legend
Regular season	G	Games coached	W	Games won	L	Games lost	W–L %	Win–loss %
Playoffs	PG	Playoff games	PW	Playoff wins	PL	Playoff losses	PW–L %	Playoff win–loss %

Team	Year	G	W	L	W–L%	Finish	PG	PW	PL	PW–L%	Result
Takamatsu Five Arrows	2010-11	48	10	38	.208	9th in Western	-	-	-	–	-
Rizing Fukuoka	2012	22	14	8	.636	5th in Western	2	0	2	.000	Lost in 1st round
Rizing Fukuoka	2012-13	52	34	18	.654	2nd in Western	4	3	1	.750	Western Champions
TGI D-Rise	2013-14	32	17	15	.531	4th	2	1	1	.500	3rd
Yamagata Wyverns	2014-15	32	10	22	.313	7th	-	-	-	–	-
Yamagata Wyverns	2015-16	36	23	13	.639	4th	2	0	2	.000	4th
