= Justin Tuggle =

American gridiron football player (born 1990)

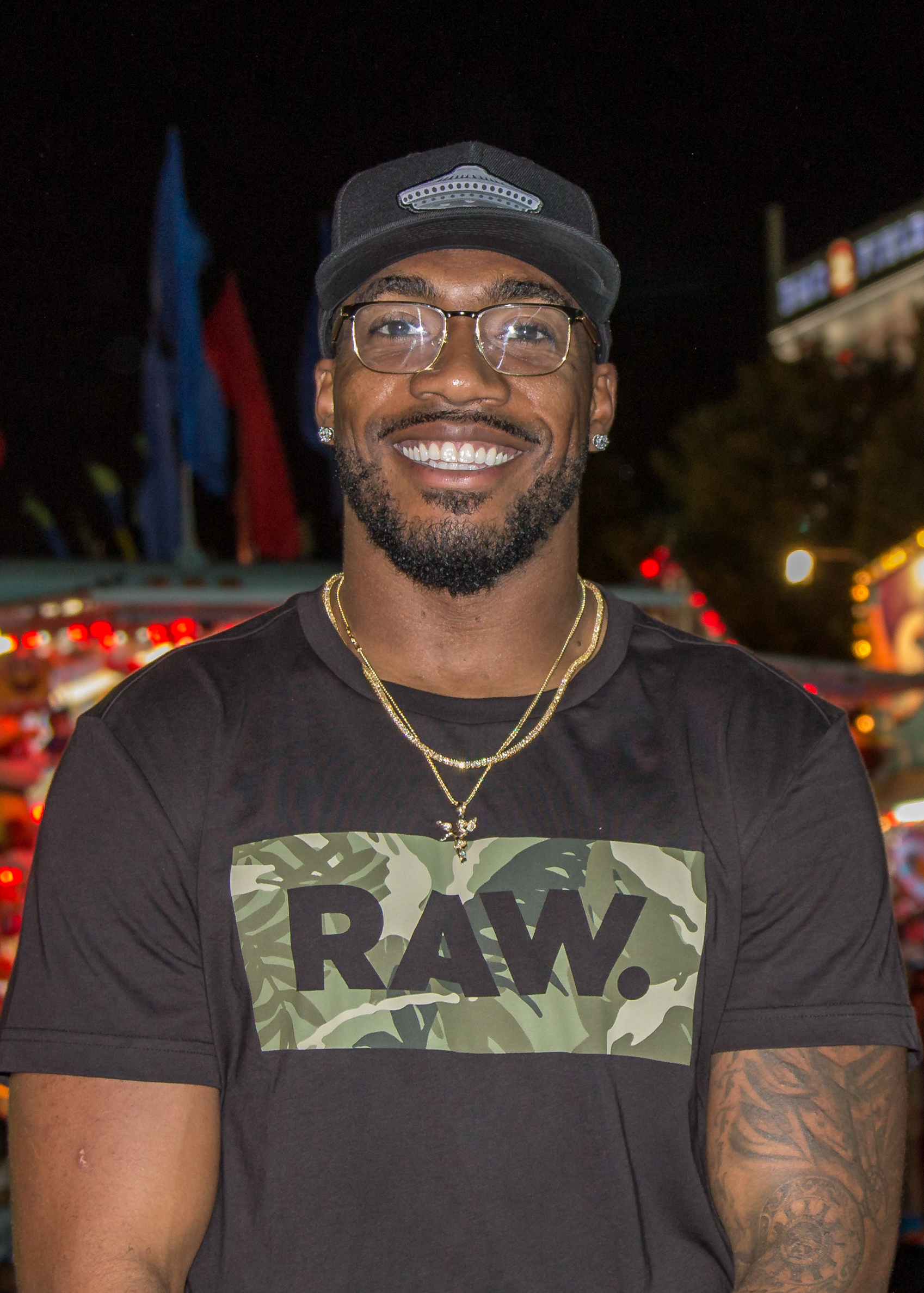
- Tuggle poses during the 2018 CNE in Toronto, modeling for his cap line

No. 22, 24, 57, 95
- Position: Linebacker

Personal information
- Born: January 4, 1990 (age 36); Alpharetta, Georgia, U.S.
- Listed height: 6 ft 3 in (1.91 m)
- Listed weight: 247 lb (112 kg)

Career information
- High school: Northview (Johns Creek, Georgia)
- College: Boston College (2008–2009); Blinn (2010); Kansas State (2011–2012)
- NFL draft: 2013: undrafted

Career history
- Houston Texans (2013–2015); Cleveland Browns (2016)*; Toronto Argonauts (2017–2018); Hamilton Tiger-Cats (2019); Edmonton Football Team (2020)*; Toronto Argonauts (2021)
- * Offseason or practice squad member only

Awards and highlights
- Grey Cup champion (2017)

Career NFL statistics
- Total tackles: 72
- Fumble recoveries: 2
- Interceptions: 1
- Stats at Pro Football Reference

Career CFL statistics
- Total tackles: 94
- Sacks: 6.0
- Interceptions: 1
- Stats at CFL.ca

Justin DuJian Tuggle (born January 4, 1990) is an American former professional football player who was a linebacker in the National Football League (NFL) and Canadian Football League (CFL). He was signed by the Houston Texans as an undrafted free agent in 2013. He played college football for the Kansas State Wildcats. Tuggle is the son of former five-time Pro Bowl linebacker Jessie Tuggle. He is also the brother of Chicago Bears defensive tackle Grady Jarrett.

== Early life ==
Tuggle attended Northview High School in the state of Georgia. He earned the Greater Atlanta All-Area honors in his senior season. He participated in the second annual Offense-Defense All-American Bowl and was the quarterback on the east team. He was selected to the 2007 All-North Fulton County team and was on the second-team offense as a quarterback.

College recruiting
Name	Hometown	School	Height	Weight	40^{‡}	Commit date
Justin Tuggle; Quarterback	Duluth, Georgia	Northview High School	6 ft 3 in (1.91 m)	205 lb (93 kg)	4.6	Jun 25, 2007
Justin Tuggle; Quarterback	Recruit ratings: Scout: Rivals:					
Overall recruit ranking: Scout: 65 (QB) Rivals: NR (QB), NR (National), NR (Georgia)
‡ Refers to 40-yard dash; Note: In many cases, Scout, Rivals, 247Sports, On3, and ESPN may conflict in their listings of height, weight and 40 time.; In these cases, the average was taken. ESPN grades are on a 100-point scale.; Sources: "2008 Boston College Football Commitments". Rivals.; "2008 Boston College Football Recruiting Commits". Scout.; "Scout.com Team Recruiting Rankings". Scout.; "2008 Team Ranking". Rivals.com.

== College career ==
Tuggle played his freshman season at Boston College where he played quarterback. In his sophomore season, he transferred to Blinn College for the spring semester. After spending his sophomore season at Blinn, he transferred to Kansas State University. He switched positions from quarterback to linebacker for his junior season and first season with the Wildcats.

== Professional career ==
Pre-draft measurables
Height	Weight	Arm length	Hand span	40-yard dash	10-yard split	20-yard split	20-yard shuttle	Three-cone drill	Vertical jump	Broad jump	Bench press
6 ft 3 in (1.91 m)	244 lb (111 kg)	32 in (0.81 m)	9 in (0.23 m)	4.86 s	1.71 s	2.75 s	4.20 s	6.94 s	30.5 in (0.77 m)	9 ft 10 in (3.00 m)	18 reps
All values from Pro Day

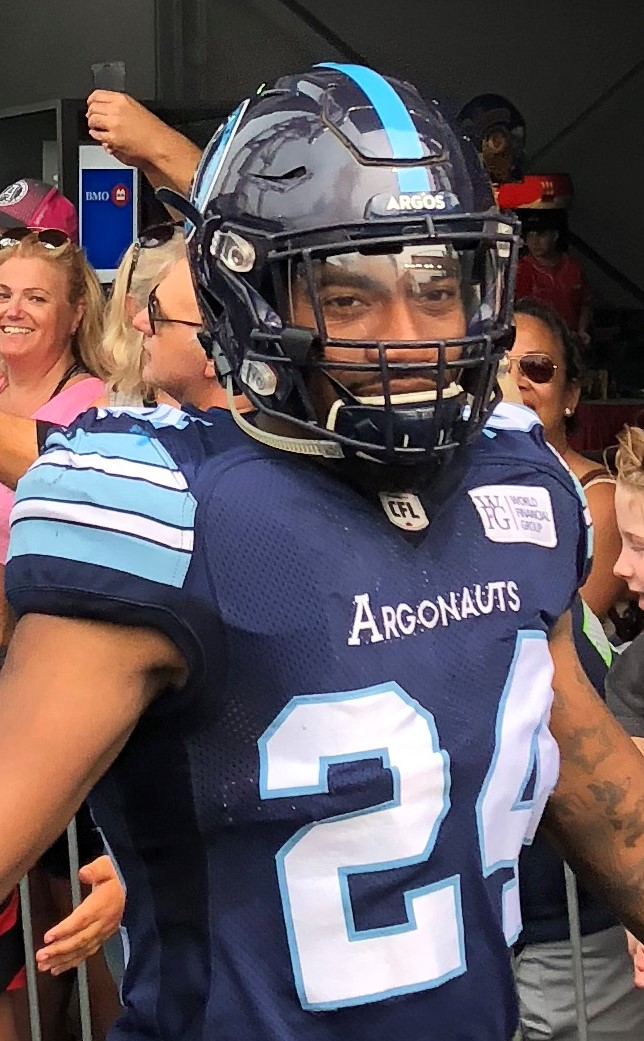
Tuggle with the Toronto Argonauts in 2018

=== Houston Texans ===
On April 27, 2013, he signed with the Houston Texans as an undrafted free agent. in 42 games over 3 seasons, Tuggle produced 71 tackles, forced one fumble, and intercepted an Andrew Luck pass which he returned for 8 yards.

=== Cleveland Browns ===
On March 11, 2016, Tuggle signed with the Cleveland Browns. On September 3, 2016, he was released by the Browns.

=== Toronto Argonauts (first stint) ===
On May 23, 2017, Tuggle signed with the Toronto Argonauts. During his first year in the CFL, Tuggle recorded three sacks, a defensive touchdown, a forced fumble, and an interception, as well as being part of the 105th Grey Cup championship team. The following season, Tuggle played in 17 games. Due to injuries to the struggling Argos, Tuggle was a starter at three different positions during the 2018 season, playing at middle linebacker, weakside linebacker, and along the defensive line. Tuggle put up a career high 36 tackles, along with three more sacks and two more forced fumbles.

=== Hamilton Tiger-Cats ===
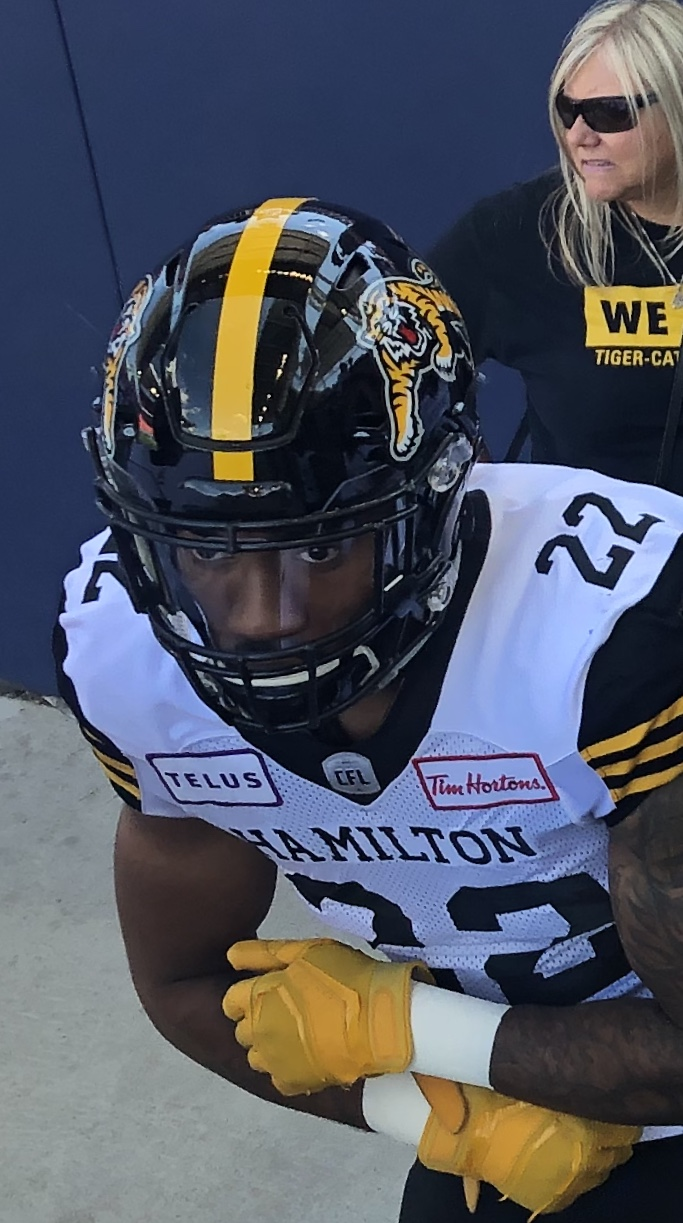
Tuggle with the Hamilton Tiger-Cats in 2019

Toronto's rival, the Hamilton Tiger-Cats, signed Tuggle as a free agent in February 2019. He played in 18 regular season games where he had 80 defensive tackles, one special teams tackle, one quarterback sack, and one interception. He also played in both post-season games, including the 107th Grey Cup where he had four defensive tackles in the loss to the Winnipeg Blue Bombers.

=== Edmonton Football Team ===
Upon entering free agency, Tuggle signed with the Edmonton Football Team on February 11, 2020. However, he did not play in 2020 due to the cancellation of the 2020 CFL season and he became a free agent again on February 9, 2021.

=== Toronto Argonauts (second stint) ===
On October 1, 2021, it was announced that Tuggle had signed with the Argonauts. He became a free agent after the 2021 season.

== Personal life ==
He is the son of Jessie Tuggle, who played in the National Football League for the Atlanta Falcons from 1987–2000. and was selected to five Pro Bowls and three All-Pro teams during his career.

His brother, Grady Jarrett, was drafted in the fifth round of the 2015 NFL draft as a defensive end for the Atlanta Falcons.

Tuggle has also released three single albums and one album consisting of 14 songs (including all three singles) titled Life on Beats by YGP (Tuggle's teammate Terrance Plummer) & take1.
