= Hiromichi Tsuda =

Japanese basketball coach

Kagawa Five Arrows
- Position: Head coach
- League: B.League

Personal information
- Born: January 26, 1943 (age 83) Fukui Prefecture

Career history

Coaching
- 1967-2014: Hokuriku HS
- 2015-2016: Takamatsu Five Arrows
- 2019-present: Kagawa Five Arrows

Career highlights

Hiromichi Tsuda (津田 洋道, Tsuda Hiromichi) is the head coach of the Takamatsu Five Arrows in the Japanese B.League.

== Head coaching record ==
Legend
Regular season	G	Games coached	W	Games won	L	Games lost	W–L %	Win–loss %
Playoffs	PG	Playoff games	PW	Playoff wins	PL	Playoff losses	PW–L %	Playoff win–loss %

Team	Year	G	W	L	W–L%	Finish	PG	PW	PL	PW–L%	Result
Takamatsu Five Arrows	2015-16	26	4	22	.154	11th in Bj Western	-	-	-	–	21st in Bj
