= Inagi Central Park Comprehensive Gymnasium =

Indoor arena and gymnasium in Inagi, Tokyo, Japan

Coordinates: 35°37′54.2″N 139°29′9.9″E

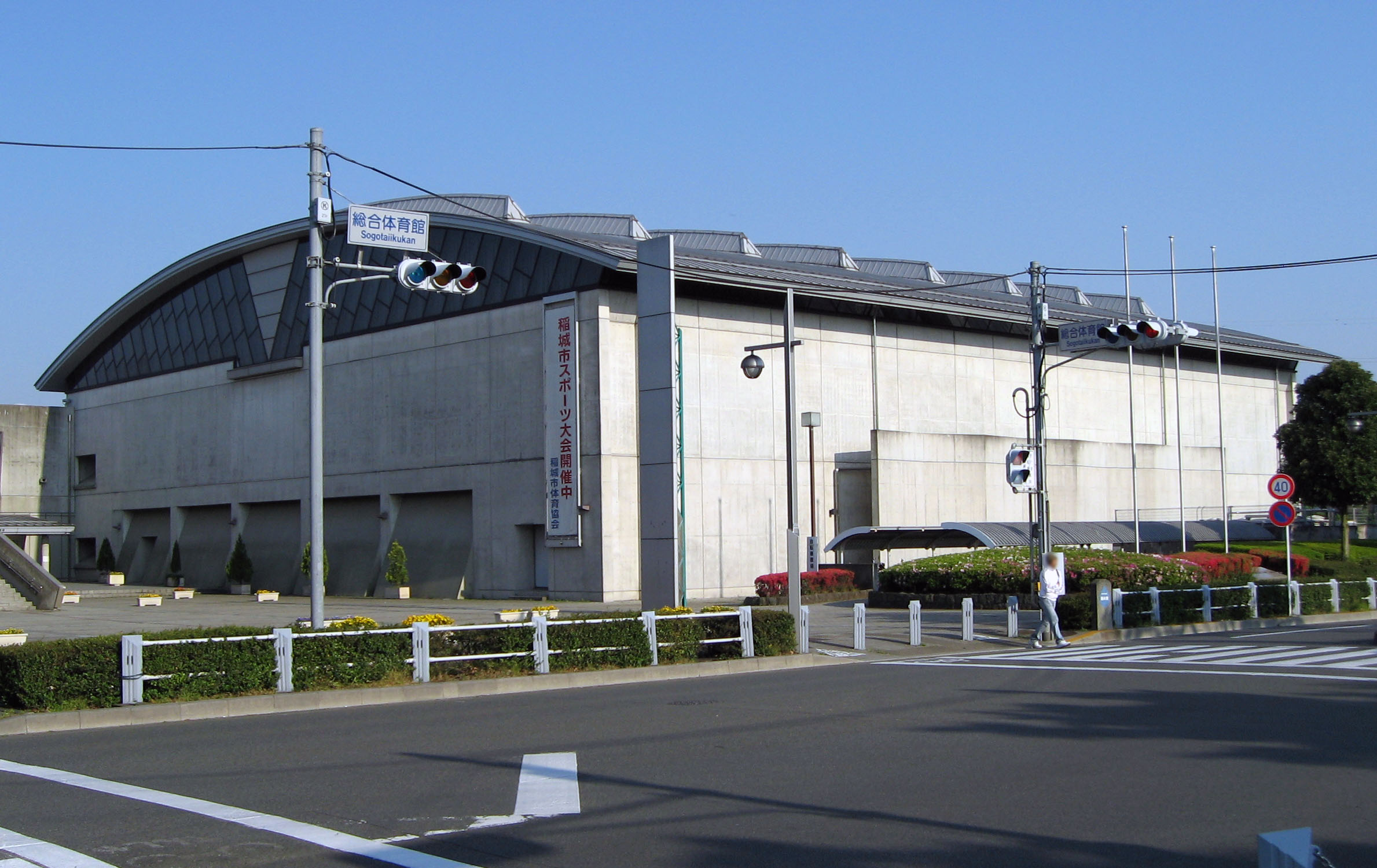
- Exterior of the gymnasium, April 2009
- Interactive map of Inagi Central Park Comprehensive Gymnasium
- Full name: Inagi Central Park Comprehensive Gymnasium
- Location: Inagi, Tokyo, Japan
- Owner: Inagi city
- Operator: A Collaborative Project to Color the Town of Inagi Together

Construction
- Opened: 1992
- Cost

Tenant
- Tokyo Cinq Reves

Inagi Central Park Comprehensive Gymnasium (nicknamed Nomura Real Estate Inagi Arena since April 2025) is a multi-purpose indoor arena in Inagi, Tokyo, Japan. It is owned by Inagi City and has been operated by the designated operator A Collaborative Project to Color the Town of Inagi Together since April 2024.

It is the home arena of the Tokyo Cinq Reves of the B.League, Japan's professional basketball league.

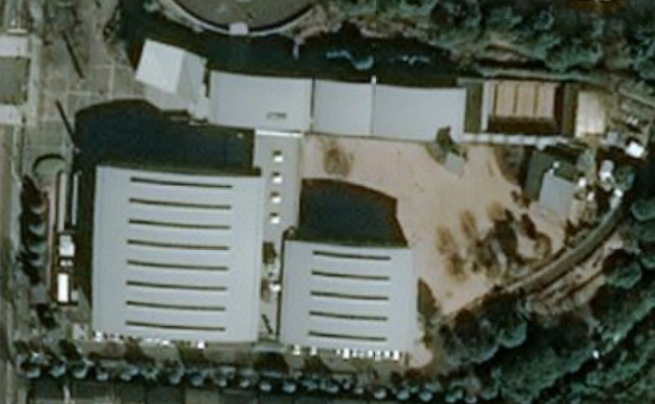
Satellite view
