= Nobuyoshi Ito =

Japanese basketball coach

Personal information
- Born: January 25, 1974 (age 52) Tochigi Prefecture

Career information
- College: Takushoku University
- Position: Head coach

Career history

Coaching
- 2004-2008: Utsunomiya Bunsei Joshi HS (asst)
- 2008-2013: Utsunomiya Bunsei Joshi HS
- 2015: Takamatsu Five Arrows
- 2015-2016: Takamatsu Five Arrows (asst)

Career highlights

Nobuyoshi Ito (伊藤 伸由, Ito Nobuyoshi) is a former head coach of the Takamatsu Five Arrows in the Japanese Bj League.

== Head coaching record ==
Legend
Regular season	G	Games coached	W	Games won	L	Games lost	W–L %	Win–loss %
Playoffs	PG	Playoff games	PW	Playoff wins	PL	Playoff losses	PW–L %	Playoff win–loss %

Team	Year	G	W	L	W–L%	Finish	PG	PW	PL	PW–L%	Result
Takamatsu Five Arrows	2015	26	7	19	.269	Fired	-	-	-	–	-
