= Kagawa Five Arrows =

Japanese basketball team

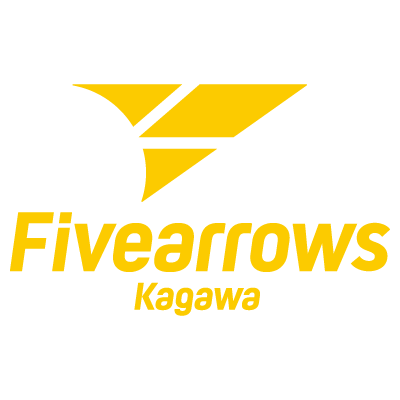
- Leagues: B.League
- Founded: 2006
- History: Takamatsu Five Arrows; 2006–2016; Kagawa Five Arrows; 2016–present
- Arena: Takamatsu City General Gymnasium; Takamatsu City Kagawa Gymnasium
- Location: Takamatsu, Kagawa
- Team colors: Yellow, Black
- Main sponsor: Anabuki Group
- President: (Japan) Naomi Murakami
- Championships: None
- Website: Kagawa Five Arrows
Home	Away

The Kagawa Five Arrows (香川ファイブアローズ, Kagawa Five Arrows) are a Japanese professional basketball team based in Takamatsu, Kagawa Prefecture. The team most recently competed in the third division of the B.League. Starting from the 2026–27 season, the team will compete in the B.League One, the league's second division, as a member of the Southern Conference.

In July 2015, the team announced its participation in the inaugural season of Japan's professional basketball league which debuted in 2016, competing in the second division.

== Roster ==
Kagawa Five Arrows roster
Players
Coaches

Pos.	No.	Nat.	Name
F	0	(Philippines)	Roosevelt Adams
C	6	(United States)	Nigel Spikes
SF	7	(Japan)	Takuro Tsukuba
G	9	(Japan)	Yukijiro Yashiro
G/F	11	(Japan)	Takaya Kudou
C	12	(Australia)	Angus Brandt (injured)
G	13	(Japan)	Reita Adachi
PG	14	(Japan)	Kotaro Hisaoka
G/F	17	(Japan)	Ryo Iida
G	24	(Japan)	Takuya Iju
PF	25	(Australia)	Rhys Vague
F/C	26	(Japan)	Akihisa Kosaka
C	32	(United States)	Kyle Richardson
PG	34	(Japan)	Takayuki Kodama (C)
G	36	(Japan)	Alexander Gaku Aihara
G	93	(Japan)	Junki Uera

Head coach

Yuichi Ishikawa

Assistant coach(es)

Sho Uesugi
Iriya Wajima

Legend

- (C) Team captain
- Injured

- Roster
Updated: 31 March 2023

== Notable players ==
Note: Flags indicate national team eligibility at FIBA-sanctioned events. Players may hold other non-FIBA nationalities not displayed.

Criteria

To appear in this section a player must have either:

- Set a club record or won an individual award while at the club
- Played at least one official international match for their national team at any time
- Played at least one official NBA match at any time.

- Morgan Hikaru Aiken
- Paul Butorac
- Babacar Camara
- Michael Gardener
- Anthony Kent (it)
- George Leach
- Brandon Penn
- Kazuhiro Shoji
- Rintaro Tokunaga
- Justin Watts
- Nyika Williams

== Head coaches ==
- Motofumi Aoki
- Johnny Neumann
- Atsushi Kanazawa
- Kenzo Maeda
- Nobuyoshi Ito
- Hiromichi Tsuda
- Joe Navarro
- Kohei Eto
- Paul Henare

== Honors ==
- bj league
  - Runners-up (1) : 2006/2007

== Problems ==
- Okayama Prefecture General Cooperation Agency has sued the Arrows for not paying gymnasium fees in 2016. The club was ¥120 million in debt as of April 17, 2015.

== Season-by-season records ==
Season	League	Regular Season					Finish	Head coach
Season	League	Win	Lose	Win%	GB	Place	Finish	Head coach
2006/2007	bj league	25	15	.625	4.0	3rd	Runners-up	(Japan) Motofumi Aoki
2007/2008	bj league	30	14	.682	4.0	West 2nd	5th	(Japan) Motofumi Aoki
2008/2009	bj league	33	19	.635	8.0	West 3rd	5th	(Japan) Motofumi Aoki
2009/2010	bj league	13	39	.250	21.0	West 7th	13	(United States) Carl John Neumann
2010/2011	bj league	10	38	.208	23.0	West 9th	16	(Japan) Atsushi Kanazawa
2011/2012	bj league	2	50	.038	37.0	West 9th	19	(Japan) Kenzo Maeda
2012/2013	bj league	20	32	.385	22.0	West 9th	15	(Japan) Kenzo Maeda

Key:

- Win%: Winning percentage
- GB: Games behind

== Arenas ==
- Takamatsu City General Gymnasium
- Takamatsu City Kagawa General Gymnasium
- Kanonji City General Gymnasium
- Toramaru Tebukuro Gymnasium
- Zentsuji Citizens Gymnasium
- Tonosho Town General Hall

== Practice facilities ==
- Takamatsu City Mure General Gymnasium (map)
