= Motofumi Aoki =

Japanese basketball player and coach

Toyotsu Fighting Eagles Nagoya
- Position: Academy Advisor
- League: B.League

Personal information
- Born: September 19, 1964 (age 62) Aichi Prefecture

Career information
- High school: Aichi Institute of Technology Meiden (Nagoya, Aichi)
- College: Chuo University
- Playing career: 1987–1993

Career history

Playing
- 1987-1993: Denso Hoop Gang

Coaching
- 1993-1996: Denso Hoop Gang
- 1996-2000: Aichi Machinery Red Wolves
- 2001-2005: Hamamatsu University
- 2006-2009: Takamatsu Five Arrows
- 2009-2010: Tokyo Apache
- 2011-2012: Shinshu Brave Warriors
- 2012-2015: Tokyo Cinq Reves

Motofumi Aoki (青木幹典, Aoki Motofumi) is the former head coach of the Takamatsu Five Arrows in the Japanese Bj League.

== Head coaching record ==
Legend
Regular season	G	Games coached	W	Games won	L	Games lost	W–L %	Win–loss %
Playoffs	PG	Playoff games	PW	Playoff wins	PL	Playoff losses	PW–L %	Playoff win–loss %

Team	Year	G	W	L	W–L%	Finish	PG	PW	PL	PW–L%	Result
Takamatsu Five Arrows	2006-07	40	25	15	.625	3rd	2	1	1	.500	Runners-up in Bj
Takamatsu Five Arrows	2007-08	44	30	14	.682	2nd in Western	1	0	1	.000	Lost in Wild card game
Takamatsu Five Arrows	2008-09	52	33	19	.635	3rd in Western	3	1	2	.333	Lost in 1st round
Tokyo Apache	2009-10	52	22	30	.423	4th in Eastern	2	0	2	.000	Lost in 1st round
Shinshu Brave Warriors	2011-12	52	18	34	.346	8th in Eastern	-	-	-	–	-
Tokyo Cinq Reves	2012-13	52	18	34	.346	8th in Eastern	-	-	-	–	-
Tokyo Cinq Reves	2013-14	52	13	39	.250	9th in Eastern	-	-	-	–	-
Tokyo Cinq Reves	2014-15	52	5	47	.096	12th in Eastern	-	-	-	–	-
