= Northview High School (Georgia) =

Public high school in Johns Creek, Georgia, United States

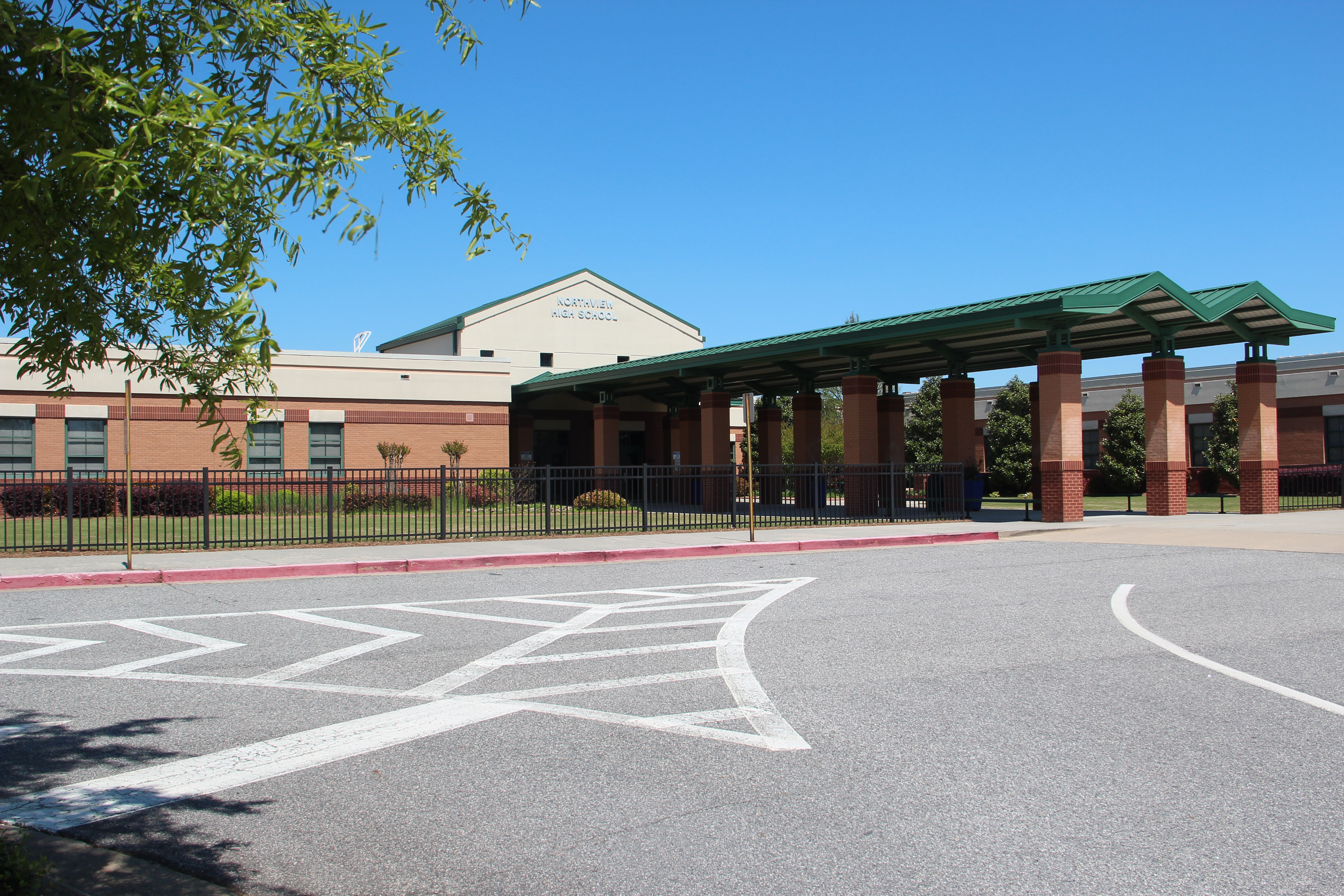

Location
- 10625 Parsons Road; Johns Creek, Georgia; United States; 34°02′21″N 84°10′40″W

Information
- Type: Public high school
- Motto: Ever upward and onward
- Established: 2002
- School district: Fulton County Schools
- CEEB code: 111148
- NCES School ID: 130228002560
- Principal: Martin Neuhaus
- Teaching staff: 92.40 (on an FTE basis)
- Grades: 9-12
- Enrollment: 1,591 (2024–2025)
- Student to teacher ratio: 17.22
- Colors: Navy blue, lime green and silver
- Nickname: Titans
- National ranking: 252
- Publication: The Muse (literary magazine)
- Newspaper: The Messenger
- Yearbook: The 505
- Website: www.northviewhigh.com

Northview High School is an American public high school in Johns Creek, Georgia serving grades 9–12. The school is a part of the Fulton County School System. Its students primarily reside inside the city of Johns Creek, though the school is also part of Alpharetta city. The school mainly consists of students from River Trail Middle School.

The school was opened in the fall of 2002. For the 2021-2022 school year the school had an enrollment of 1,752 students, 79% of which were minority students. The student-to-teacher ratio is 17.52:1. As of 2022, USNews has ranked the school 252th nationally, 6th in Georgia, and 1st in Fulton County high schools. The school has a 96 percent graduation rate. It is a part of the Fulton County School System.

The school's mascot is the Titan.

== Student Data ==
=== Demographics ===
During the 2021-2022 school year, Northview had an enrollment of 1,752 students. The student body was 20.9% White, 55.8% Asian, 6.8% Hispanic, 12.4% Black, 3.9% Multiracial, and 0.1% Native American.

== Academics ==
Northview High School offers approximately one hundred student clubs, service organizations, and academic teams.

Northview follows a traditional semester schedule with two 18-week semesters per school year. Each student receives 0.5 units of credit per course at the end of a semester and must carry a full schedule of 6 classes per day.

Northview offers dual enrollment courses with Georgia Tech, Gwinnett Technical College, Kennesaw State University, and Georgia Perimeter College.

== Athletics ==
Northview competes in Region 5-AAAAA.

Northview's sports include football, basketball, baseball, soccer, softball, tennis, lacrosse, volleyball, track, cross country, wrestling, swimming and diving, and golf.

Since 2010, Northview has hosted the playoffs of the Southeastern Lacrosse Conference.

=== State championships ===
As of the 2021–22 season.

Type	Competition	State Titles	Season(s)	Sources
Boys Sports	Baseball	0		
Boys Sports	Basketball	0		
Boys Sports	Cross Country	0		
Boys Sports	Football	0		
Boys Sports	Golf	2	2003, 2007	
Boys Sports	Ice Hockey	1 in 2005		
Boys Sports	Roller Hockey	1 in 2006		
Boys Sports	Lacrosse	1	2014	
Boys Sports	Soccer	0		
Boys Sports	Swimming	0		
Boys Sports	Wrestling	0		
Boys Sports	Tennis	7	2006, 2007, 2008, 2009, 2014, 2016, 2017	
Track & Field	0			
Girls Sports	Basketball	0		
Girls Sports	Cheerleading	0		
Girls Sports	Cross Country	2	2013, 2014	
Girls Sports	Golf	3	2006, 2007, 2018	
Girls Sports	Lacrosse	0		
Girls Sports	Soccer	0		
Girls Sports	Softball	0		
Girls Sports	Swimming	1	2007	
Girls Sports	Tennis	3	2018, 2022, 2023	
Girls Sports	Track & Field	0		
Girls Sports	Volleyball	3	2005, 2007, 2008	

Key:

School Boys' Record
School Girls' Record

- Boys tennis: 2006–2009, 2014, 2016-2017
- Boys golf: 2003, 2007
- Boys lacrosse: 2014
- Girls golf: 2006, 2007, 2018
- Volleyball:: 2005, 2007, 2008
- Girls swimming: 2007
- Girls cross country: 2013, 2014
- Girls tennis: 2018, 2022, 2023

== Notable alumni ==
- Jason Delay, baseball player
- Tyler Krieger, baseball player
- Reggie McClain, baseball player
- Ralph Sampson III, basketball player
- Justin Tuggle, football player
- Devon Werkheiser, actor
