= Joe Navarro (basketball) =

American basketball coach

Tokyo Cinq Rêves
- Title: Head coach
- League: B.League

Personal information
- Born: June 25, 1972 (age 54) Los Angeles, California

Career information
- College: Concordia (Oregon) (1993–1995)
- Position: Point guard
- Coaching career: 2004–present

Career history

Coaching
- 2004–2012: Concordia (Oregon) (assistant)
- 2012–2014: Vancouver Volcanoes
- 2014–2016: Hiroshima Lightning
- 2016–2017: Kagawa Five Arrows
- 2017–present: Tokyo Cinq Rêves

Career highlights
- IBL Coach of the Year (2014)

Joe Navarro (born June 25, 1972) is an American basketball head coach for the Tokyo Cinq Rêves of the Japanese B.League.

== Head coaching record ==
Legend
Regular season	G	Games coached	W	Games won	L	Games lost	W–L %	Win–loss %
Playoffs	PG	Playoff games	PW	Playoff wins	PL	Playoff losses	PW–L %	Playoff win–loss %

Team	Year	G	W	L	W–L%	Finish	PG	PW	PL	PW–L%	Result
Hiroshima Lightning	2015-16	48	1	47	.021	12th in Western	-	-	-	–	-
Kagawa Five Arrows	2016-17	60	19	41	.317	5th in B2 Western	-	-	-	–	-
Tokyo Cinq Rêves	2017-18	42	6	36	.122	8th in B3	20	2	18	.100	6th in Final stage
