= White Station High School =

Coordinates: 35.1188°N 89.9060°W

- Entrance of White Station High School in June 2026

Location
- 514 S Perkins Rd; Memphis, Tennessee 38117; United States

Information
- Type: Public
- Established: 1897
- Principal: Carrye Holland
- Teaching staff: 108.49 (FTE)
- Grades: 9–12
- Enrollment: 1,935 (2023–2024)
- Student to teacher ratio: 17.84
- Colors: Green and gray
- Team name: Spartans
- Website: whitestation-hs.scsk12.org

White Station High School is a four-year public high school located in Memphis, Tennessee. White Station High is a member of the Shelby County Schools system.

The Tennessee Department of Education designated White Station High School as a Reward School for the 2018–2019 school year. White Station is also ranked #15 in Tennessee high schools and #1 in Memphis high schools by U.S. News.

== History ==
White Station can trace its origins to a school organized just prior to the Civil War that initially shared a building with a Masonic lodge. By 1897, the school, then known as Albert Pike High School, occupied the entire building and, with an enrollment of eighty students, was one of the largest schools in Shelby County. After World War I, the school was renamed White Station to honor Mr. Eppie White, who had donated three acres of land for the construction of a school building. The school served first through eighth grades during this time.

After the White Station area was annexed to Memphis, the school became part of the Memphis City Schools during the 1950–1951 academic year. At that time, the Memphis City Board of Education foresaw the need for a separate junior and senior high school in the area to accommodate the growing population. Rush W. Siler, a mathematics teacher at East High School, was appointed as principal in 1951, and White Station began to develop a junior high. In August 1954, a high school building was completed, and the school began to develop a senior high school program. As such, White Station Middle School and White Station Elementary School were formed.

At this point, White Station High School needed a distinctive identity as a full-fledged Memphis high school. The original White Station mascot was a bulldog and the school newspaper was The Bulldog Leash, with school colors of blue and white. However, these colors were already in use by Memphis Catholic High School. The first senior class of 1956–1957 chose Spartans as their mascot and green and gray as school colors. In keeping with the ancient Greek theme, the White Station newspaper was dubbed The Scroll and the yearbook became The Shield.

The first high school class of seventy-eight seniors graduated on May 30, 1957.

The school began development on a new building in 2009, which was completed sometime in 2011. In the same year, an older building was torn down. The Freshman Academy was completed in the summer of 2011 and the old South Annex was torn down in response. A new parking lot was created. As of 2014, a grant was received to update the cafeteria and the picnic tables in the courtyard.

== Academics ==
White Station is an optional school that offers an Optional (Honors) Diploma.

Newsweek magazine ranked White Station #1027 in the United States and #8 in Tennessee in its 2009–2010 edition of America's Best High Schools. White Station High made Adequate Yearly Progress (AYP) in 2007.

In the 2011–2012 school year, White Station had 22 National Merit Semifinalists, more than any other school (public, private, or charter) in the state of Tennessee. In the 2012–2013 school year, White Station announced 23 National Merit Semifinalists.

White Station High School has also had the most National Merit Scholarship semifinalists of any school in the state of Tennessee in many previous years.

Class sizes averaged 20.7 students per teacher at the time of these achievements; however, class size averages have increased to 27 students per teacher.

White Station has 7 National Board Certified teachers.

=== Enrollment ===
Currently, there are more than 2,569 students at White Station: 31% are Caucasian, 44% are African American, 9.1% are Asian or Pacific Islander and 11% are Hispanic.

In addition to students from the surrounding neighborhood and who travel from all over the city for the school's college preparatory program, White Station serves the family housing units of the University of Memphis at the Park Avenue Campus.

=== Curriculum ===
In January 2014, White Station High School announced that they would be offering the AP Capstone program in the 2014–2015 school year. In February 2022, White Station was announced to be one of 60 schools piloting the AP African American Studies Program. White Station offers several foreign language options for students, including Spanish, Latin, Japanese, French and Mandarin Chinese.

== Extracurriculars ==
=== Athletics ===
White Station High School has a long tradition of athletics. They currently have basketball teams (M/F), soccer teams (M/F), track and field teams (M/F), a football team, a bowling team (M/F), lacrosse teams (F), a golf team (M/F), a volleyball team (F), rugby teams (M), cross-country teams (M/F), ultimate teams (M/F), a swim team (Co-ed), a wrestling team (M), a baseball team (M), a softball team (F), a cheerleading team (F), and a tennis team (M/F).

The Lady Spartans tennis team has won the city championship for 3 consecutive years, 2009–2011, and finished as state runner-up in 2009, 2010, and 2011. The boys' tennis team won the 2011 district championship and advanced one player to the state championships. White Station's Lady Spartans volleyball team won the Memphis city championships in 2006, 2007, and 2008. The boys and girls Cross Country teams have won the Memphis city championship for 5 consecutive years. Additionally, the White Station High School cross-country teams sent 3 runners to the Tennessee Cross Country State Championships this year; they were Jarryn Lowe, Russell Wolfe, and Gabrielle Shirley. Jarryn Lowe finished 30th overall at the state championship. The Bowling Team won the city championship in 2014 and advanced to state.

In 2009, the Spartans won the Division 6A State Title, the highest football division in the state. In 2013 the Spartan football team made it to 6A state semifinals, a game they lost 49–41 to Hendersonville High School.

=== Clubs and activities ===
White Station has many active clubs in areas including foreign language, mathematics, science, business, government, music, art, film and community service. Its Knowledge Bowl team has won four Knowledge Bowl championships in the past years, winning the first Knowledge Bowl ever in 1987–1988, and in 2014 – beating Houston in the final round. Its Mock Trial team won the Tennessee State Championship in 2009, 2010, and 2011.

White Station's Science Olympiad team consistently places well in the state, placing 2nd in 2014, 2015, and 2018 while going to Nationals in 2017, 2019, 2021, 2025 and 2026 with their best Nationals placement being 34th, the best in 15 years for TN [as of April 2026].

Their Model United Nations team is a completely student-run, ranked team in the Mid-South region as they attend various conferences such as VUMUN, WUMUNS, MUNI, WAVEMUN, and MSMUN, winning Best Large Delegation consistently. Additionally, they annually host a conference at White Station High in September, garnering attendance from various schools across the Mid-South. The Quiz Bowl team in White Station is another one of the major clubs. It is largely student-led. This club travels to surrounding areas and competes against other schools. Two tournaments are hosted by the Quiz Bowl Team each school year. Other activities include an elected student council, jazz ensemble, DECA, and HOSA club.

Students staff the school newspaper (The Scroll), the yearbook (The Shield), and an art and literary magazine (The Scribbler). Also, students in the art program at White Station High School consistently perform well in art competitions. Several students from White Station have won the Memphis International Airport Art Contest, and last year students from White Station won over 30 gold keys in the Scholastic Art and Writing Awards.

In the performing arts, White Station has four bands and two orchestras, as well as five choirs and two a cappella pop groups. The four bands are as follows: Jazz Ensemble, Wind Ensemble, Symphonic Band, and Concert Band. There is a marching band that starts in July and goes on until December, depending on if the football team makes it to the playoffs for it plays on football games. The WSHS came second in a 2014 band competition. The orchestras have gained superior ratings at concert festival and also hold many of the positions in the All-West Tennessee band, orchestra, and choir, as well as spots in the Memphis Youth Symphony and All-State ensembles. White Station's choir program has performed at events such as the Tennessee Holocaust Day of Remembrance and the TMEA conference. In 2014, the White Station Men's Chorus was selected to perform at Southern division ACDA in Jacksonville, Florida. Each year, the choir program sends a substantial percentage of students to All-West and All-State.

White Station has a theatre program, including troupe 1581 of the International Thespian Society. Students present a major performance each fall and spring, and the senior-level play production class produces an annual one-act play festival as well.

White Station has a prominent Army JROTC program. Since their inception in 1967, the Spartan Battalion teaches young people to be better citizens. Students who enroll in this class, cadets, are taught about US history, civics, and military tradition. Cadets join many different teams inside of JROTC: Knowledge Bowl, Raiders, Marksmanship, Treble Corps, Robotics, Color Guard, Armed Drill Team, and Unarmed Drill Team. The JLAB Team (a branch of the Knowledge Bowl Team) finished first in the JROTC Leadership and Academic Bowl Championship in the Army Academic Challenge in 2019.

== Notable alumni ==
=== Actors/producers ===
- Kathy Bates, Academy Award-winning actress
- Clare Grant, actress, model and producer
- Ryan Masson, actor
- Dan Schneider, actor, writer, and television producer

=== Agriculturalist ===
- Cary Fowler, agriculturalist and former executive director of Global Crop Diversity Trust

=== Basketball ===
- Leron Black
- Chris Chiozza
- Joe Jackson
- Marvin Williams

=== Fashion designer ===
- Dana Buchman, fashion designer

=== Football ===
- Dillon Mitchell
- Elias Neal
- Cedrick Wilson Jr.
- Terry Wright

=== Journalist/writer ===
- Paul Finebaum, sports media commentator
- Dolen Perkins-Valdez, novelist and professor

=== Musician ===
- Tay Keith, American record producer and songwriter
- Andrew VanWyngarden, rock musician, MGMT

=== Politics ===
- David Kustoff, U.S. congressman (2016–present) and attorney

=== Scientist ===
- Alan Lightman, theoretical physicist and novelist
