= Yamaguchi Patsfive =

- Division: Third
- Leagues: B.League
- Founded: 2020; 6 years ago
- History: Yamaguchi Patriots; 2020–2023; Yamaguchi Patsfive; 2023–present
- Arena: Ube Tawarada Memorial Gymnasium
- Capacity: 3,000
- Location: Ube, Yamaguchi
- Head coach: Kazuto Samejima
- Website: Official website
Home	Away

The Yamaguchi Patsfive (山口パッツファイブ,Yamaguchi Pattsufaibu), (Formerly known as Yamaguchi Patriots) is a Japanese professional basketball team based in Yamaguchi, Yamaguchi Prefecture. The team competes in the B.League Next, the third division of the B.League

== History ==
For the 2023–24 season, the Yamaguchi Patriots announced an official name change to Yamaguchi Patsfive due to trademark issues. Samejima Kazuto was appointed as the 2nd generation HC as a player.

== Roster ==
Yamaguchi Patsfive roster
Players
Coaches

Pos.	No.	Nat.	Name
F/C	1	(United States)	Deandre Abram
SF	2	(Japan)	Daiki Uematsu
PG	5	(Japan)	Kazuto Samejima
F	7	(United States)	Jelan Kendrick
SG	8	(Japan)	Daichi Shimoyama
G	9	(Japan)	Yuki Shigetomi (C)
SG	11	(Japan)	Rikiya Yamaguchi
F/C	14	(Japan)	Desmond Jackson
SF	23	(Japan)	Leon Ishibashi
PG	25	(Japan)	Konosuke Tanaka
SF	31	(Japan)	Issei Tomida
SG	32	(Japan)	Jo Yoshikawa
SF	77	(Japan)	Kiichi Kawakami
SF	69	(United States)	Kamron Valerio

Head coach

Kazuto Samejima

Assistant coach(es)

Takeo Zouraku

Legend

- (C) Team captain
- Injured

- Roster
Updated: August 5, 2023

== Notable players ==
- Morgan Hikaru Aiken
- Robert Sampson (basketball)

== Coaches ==
- John Saintignon

== Arenas ==
- Ube Tawarada Memorial Gymnasium

== Kit evolution ==
Home kit - 1st
2021-22	2022-23	2023-24

Away kit - 2nd
2021-22	2022-23	2023-24

3rd
2021-22
