= Anabuki (surname) =

Anabuki (written: 穴吹) is a Japanese surname. Notable people with the surname include:

- Satoru Anabuki (穴吹 智; 1921–2005), Japanese World War II flying ace
- Yoshio Anabuki (穴吹 義雄; 1933–2018), Japanese baseball player and manager

== Fictional characters ==
- Tomoko Anabuki, protagonist in the light novel version of Strike Witches
