= Anabuki Kosan =

Japanese real estate company

Anabuki Kosan Inc.

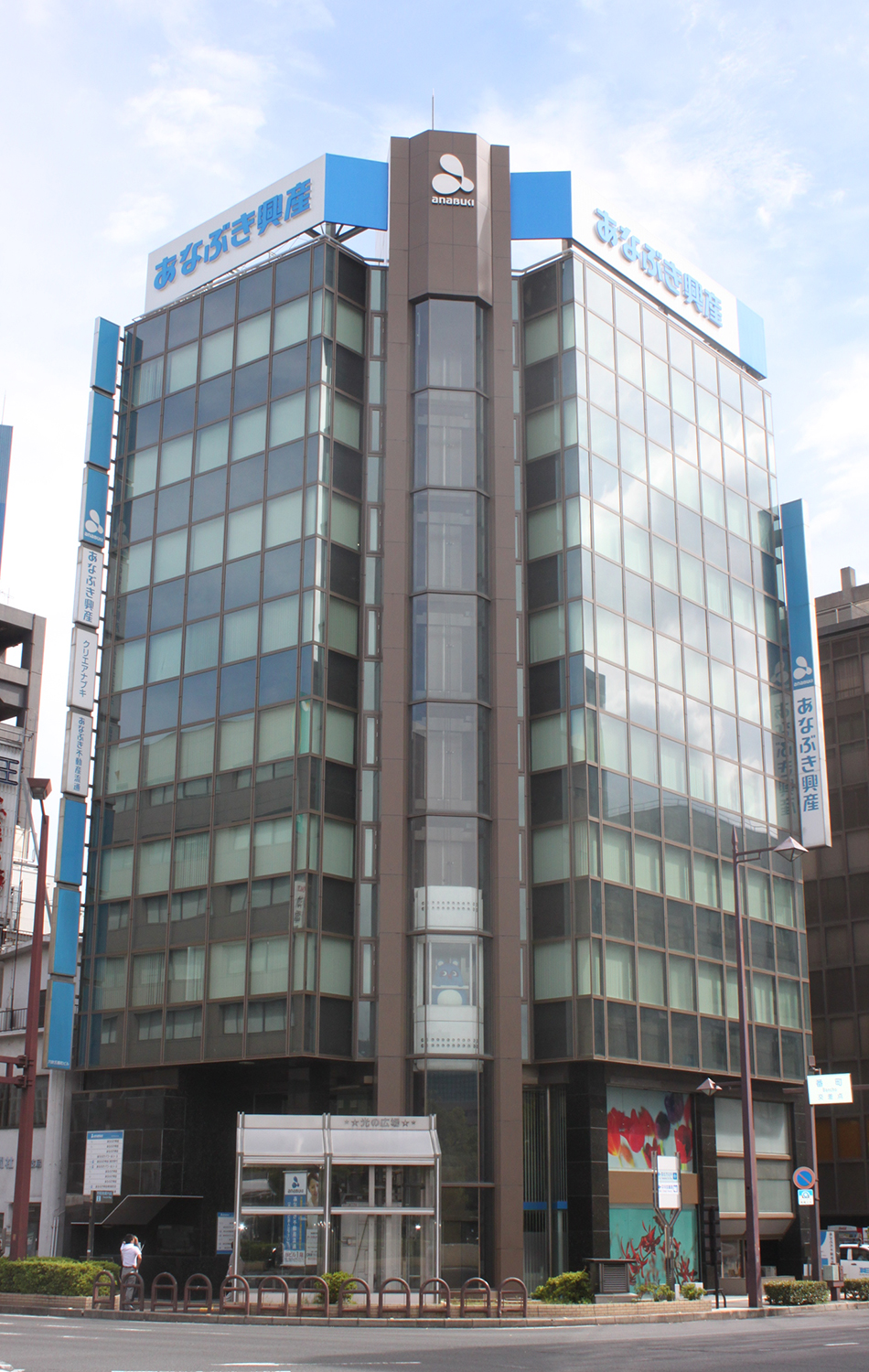
- Headquarters of Anabuki Kosan
- Native name: 穴吹興産 株式会社
- Romanized name: Anabuki Kōsan Kabushiki gaisha
- Company type: Kabushiki gaisha
- Industry: Real estate
- Founded: May 25, 1964; 61 years ago
- Headquarters: Takamatsu, Kagawa Prefecture, Japan
- Website: www.anabuki.ne.jp

Anabuki Kosan Inc. (穴吹興産 株式会社, Anabuki Kōsan Kabushiki gaisha) is a Japanese real estate company, established in 1964 and headquartered in Takamatsu, Kagawa Prefecture. It was previously part of the Anabuki Construction group, but is separate since 2000. Anabuki Kosan markets condominiums under the brand Alpha, and since more recently Alpha Smart. It is listed on the Tokyo Stock Exchange as TYO: 8928. The president is Tadatsugu Anabuki.
