= Ralph Sampson III =

American basketball player (born 1990)

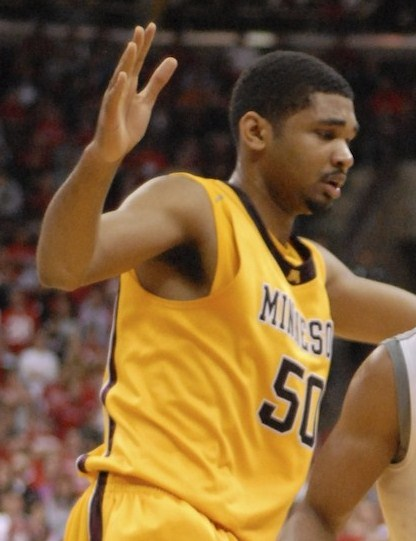
- Sampson in college with Minnesota in 2009

Personal information
- Born: January 5, 1990 (age 36) Duluth, Georgia, U.S.
- Listed height: 6 ft 11 in (2.11 m)
- Listed weight: 253 lb (115 kg)

Career information
- High school: Northview (Johns Creek, Georgia)
- College: Minnesota (2008–2012)
- NBA draft: 2012: undrafted
- Playing career: 2012–2016
- Position: Center

Career history
- 2012–2013: Reno Bighorns
- 2013–2014: Nilan Bisons
- 2014–2016: Maine Red Claws
- Stats at Basketball Reference

Ralph Lee Sampson III (born January 5, 1990) is an American former professional basketball player. He played college basketball for the Minnesota Golden Gophers.

== High school career ==
Sampson attended Northview High School in Johns Creek, Georgia. As a senior in 2007–08, he averaged 19.3 points, 10.3 rebounds and 7.0 blocks per game in leading Northview to its first state tournament appearance and a 21–9 record.

== College career ==
During his freshman season at the University of Minnesota in 2008–09, Sampson started every Big Ten Conference game, helped the Gophers earn an NCAA tournament bid, and finished second on the team in both rebounds and blocked shots per game. Sampson started at forward and center in his sophomore and junior seasons for the Gophers and saw his minutes, points, and blocks per game increase each year.

As one of the lone veterans on the team, Sampson's stats declined as a senior, when he played nearly six fewer minutes per game than he did his junior season while averaging 7.9 points and 4.6 rebounds per game. After injuring his knee during a practice in March, Sampson was inactive for the rest of the season, including the Big Ten tournament and the postseason NIT. He joined Kevin McHale and Mychal Thompson as one of the few Minnesota players to amass more than 1,000 points, 500 rebounds, and 200 blocks during their respective collegiate careers.

== Professional career ==
After going undrafted in the 2012 NBA draft, Sampson joined the Charlotte Bobcats for the 2012 NBA Summer League. On November 2, 2012, he was selected by the Reno Bighorns in the third round of the 2012 NBA Development League Draft. He went on to average 2.3 points and 2.1 rebounds in 23 games for Reno in 2012–13.

On September 7, 2013, Sampson signed a one-year deal with Nilan Bisons Loimaa of the Finnish Korisliiga. In 16 league games for Loimaa, he averaged 5.3 points and 4.2 rebounds per game.

On November 1, 2014, Sampson was acquired by the Maine Red Claws. In 51 games for the Red Claws in 2014–15, he averaged 5.9 points, 5.7 rebounds and 1.8 blocks per game. On October 31, 2015, he was reacquired by the Red Claws.

On August 24, 2016, Sampson's D-League rights were acquired by the Windy City Bulls in the expansion draft. However, his rights would be waived before the beginning of the season, and he would be drafted to the Northern Arizona Suns on October 29 in the fifth round. On November 2, he was waived by the Suns.

== Personal life ==
Sampson is the son of Ralph Jr. and Aleize Sampson, and has three siblings: one older sister, Rachel, a younger brother, Robert, and a younger sister, Anna. His father was the number one overall pick in the 1983 NBA draft and played nine seasons in the NBA, earning NBA All-Star honors four times and Rookie of the Year honors in 1984. He was inducted into the Basketball Hall of Fame for his overall success in the sport.
