= Anabuki Construction =

Japanese construction and real estate company

Anabuki Construction Inc.
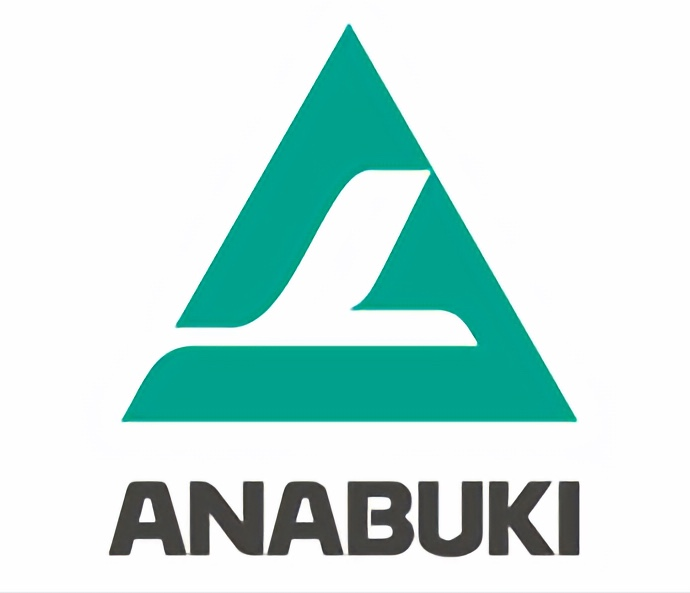
- Native name: 株式会社 穴吹工務店
- Romanized name: Kabushiki gaisha Anabuki Kōmuten
- Type: Kabushiki gaisha
- Industry: Construction, Real estate
- Founded: January 11, 1961; 65 years ago
- Headquarters: Tokyo, Japan
- Website: www.anabuki.com

Anabuki Construction Inc. (株式会社 穴吹工務店, Kabushiki gaisha Anabuki Kōmuten) is a Japanese construction and real estate company for apartment buildings founded in 1961. In early 2008, it was reported that Anabuki became Japan's leading seller of condominia, ending Daikyo's 29 year lead.

The company advertising mascot Anabukin-chan is a little girl based on Little Red Riding Hood. Her name is a pun on "Akazukin-chan", which is Little Red Riding Hood's name in Japan.
