= Shinagawa City Basketball Club =

Basketball team in Tokyo, Japan

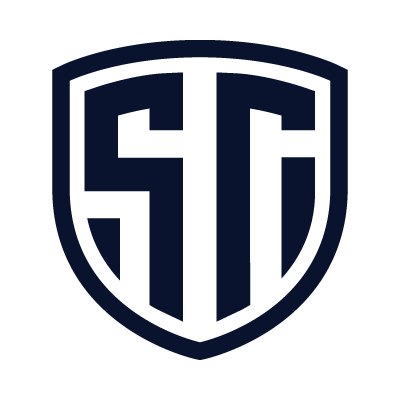
- Division: Third
- Leagues: B.League
- Founded: 2012
- History: Tokyo Cinq Rêves (2012–2021); Shinagawa City Basketball Club (2021–present)
- Arena: Shinagawa CIty Togoshi Gymnasium
- Capacity: 424
- Location: Shinagawa, Tokyo
- Head coach: Tomoya Sano
- Website: Official website
Home	Away

The Shinagawa City Basketball Club is a Japanese professional basketball team based in Shinagawa, Tokyo. The team competes in the B.League Next, the third division of the B.League.

== Roster ==
Shinagawa City Basketball Club roster
Players
Coaches

Pos.	No.	Nat.	Name
SG	1	(Japan)	Kunitatsu Ogata
PG	2	(Japan)	Haruto Kimura
PG	3	(Japan)	Seiya Horituchi
SG	4	(Japan)	Kaito Yazawa
SG	7	(Japan)	Yudai Komiya
PG	9	(Japan)	Hibiki Yamane
SG	10	(Japan)	Toma Nozawa
PG	16	(Japan)	Ryota Ito (C)
PF	23	(Japan)	Michael Craig
C	25	(Japan)	Hayden Koval
PF	40	(Japan)	Jordan Faison
SG	44	(Japan)	Akihisa Nohara
SG	71	(Japan)	Hiroki Higashi
F/C	91	(Japan)	Tomoya Ochiai

Head coach

Tomoya Sano

Assistant coach(es)

Hidenori Fukuda

Legend

- (C) Team captain
- Injured

- Roster
Updated: 2 August 2023

== Notable players ==
Former logo

- Morgan Hikaru Aiken
- Yuji Funayama (basketball)
- Zane Knowles
- Andre Murray [tl], League's steal leader in 2016
- El Hadji Ndieguene
- Samuel Jr. Sawaji
- Anthony Stover
- Hirohisa Takada
- Shoya Uchimura
- Marvin Williams
- Ricky Woods
- Dan Sperrazza
- Michael Craig
- Hayden Koval
- Jordan Faison
- Ali Bagir

== Coaches ==
- Motofumi Aoki
- Kenichi Kawachi
- Kazuo Kusumoto
- Lars Ekström
- Joe Navarro (basketball)
- Osamu Okada (es)
- Yasuhito Matsui

== Arenas ==
- Inagi City General Gymnasium
- Ota City General Gymnasium
- Nihon Kogakuin Arena
- Musashino Forest Sports Plaza
- Chuo Ward General Sports Center
- Musashino Sports Complex
- Machida City General Gymnasium
- Higashimurayama Citizens Sports Center
- Samukawa General Gymnasium

== Kit evolution ==
Home - 1st
2017 - 18	2018 - 19	2019 - 20	2021 - 22	2022 - 23
2023 - 24				

Away - 2nd
2017 - 18	2018 - 19	2019 - 20	2021 - 22	2022 - 23
2023 - 24				
