= List of Japanese announcers =

This is a list of announcers on Japanese television and radio.

== Television stations in Tokyo ==
=== Nippon Television Network Corporation - NTV ===
- Men
  - Tomonori Yamashita
  - Takahiko Fujii, host of morning show "Zoom-In Saturday!".
  - Shinichi Hatori, host of morning show "Zoom-In Super!" and cast of some variety show.
  - Masashi Funakoshi
- Women
  - Mika Takanishi
  - Yukari Nishio, host of morning show "Zoom-In Super!".
  - Noriko Baba, co-host of reality show "The Sekai-gyoten News".
  - Tomoyo Shibata, wife of Boston Red Sox player Daisuke Matsuzaka
  - Asami Miura

=== Tokyo Broadcasting System, Inc. - TBS ===
- Men
  - Ayumi Akaogi
  - Toshiyuki Doi, co-host of morning show "Watch!" and sports commentator.
  - Tadahiko Sako, co-anchor of "NEWS23 with Tetsuya Chikushi".
  - Shinichiro Azumi
  - Hiroki Ando, cast of Sunday daytime show "Akko ni Omakase".
- Women
  - Maya Kobayashi, entertainment news anchor of "Watch!" and cast of cooking show "Saturday Night Chubou".
  - Ikumi Kimura, co-host of morning show "Watch!".
  - Hiroko Ogura, co-anchor of "JNN News Forest, The Evening News" (Present: "JNN Evening News").
  - Tomoko Kubota, co-host of game show "Amazing Animals".
  - Mai Demizu, co-host of game show "Sekai Fushigi Hakken!" and political talk show "Jijihōdan".
  - Akiyo Yoshida, co-host of medical program "Last Minute Doctor!"

=== Fuji Television Network, Inc. - CX ===
==== Men ====
  - Tetsuo Suda, co-anchor on evening news program "FNN Supernews".
  - Kenji Kawabata, co-anchor on daytime news program "FNN Speak".
  - Tetsuo Nagasaka, sports announcer.
  - Masaharu Miyake, sports announcer (baseball, martial arts, Formula One, volleyball).
  - Tsuneo Shiobara, Formula One announcer.
  - Toshihiro Ito, Formula One announcer, a narrator on "Nep League".
  - Yutaka Hasegawa, sports commentator, Formula One announcer.
- 2001
  - Hiroki Okada
  - Tomoya Morishita
  - Kazuhiro Watanabe
- 2002
  - Takuya Watanabe
- 2003
  - Daiki Tanaka
- 2004
  - Taisei Kurata
- 2005
  - Yusho Tabuchi

==== Women ====
  - Yumi Masuda
- 2000
  - Yaeko Umezu
  - Maya Masai
- 2001
  - Sayaka Morimoto
  - Aya Takashima - called "Ayapan"
- 2002
  - Hitomi Nakamura
  - Minako Nakano
- 2003
  - Saori Ishimoto
  - Tsubasa Nagano
  - Yoko Tobe
- 2004
  - Maasa Takahashi - reporter of "FNN Supernews Weekend".
  - Maiko Saito
- 2005
  - Reiko Endo
  - Rio Hirai - Former TV personality "OHA-GIRL Banana"

=== TV Asahi Corporation - EX ===
- Men
  - Masahiro Sasaki
  - Tomonoshin Kokubo
  - Naoki Tsuboi, co-anchor of evening news "ANN Super J Channel".
  - Shinichiro Kawamatsu
- Women
  - Mayumi Kawase, anchor of ANN News.
  - Sayaka Shimohira
  - Emi Takeuchi, sports anchor of nightly news program "Houdou Station".
  - Mariko Doh, host of live music show "Music Station" with Tamori.

=== TV Tokyo Corporation - TX ===
- Men
  - Masaru Akahira
  - Tomoki Uekusa
- Women
  - Akiko Sasaki, co-anchor of evening news "TXN NewsEye".
  - Masumi Chihara
  - Yo Saito

== Radio stations in Tokyo ==
=== Nippon Cultural Broadcasting, Inc. - QR ===
- Men
  - Naomasa Terashima
  - Hideaki Oota
  - Kunimaru Nomura
- Women
  - Junko Suzuki
  - Kana Mizutani
  - Chiho Fujiki

=== Nippon Broadcasting System, Inc. - LF ===
- Men
  - Takashi Tsukagoshi
  - Ryohei Sakuraba
  - Hideo Matsumoto
  - Hisanori Yoshida
  - Kohji Iida
- Women
  - Eriko Nasu
  - Sakaya Masuyama
  - Yumi Tashiro
  - Yoshiko Kawano
  - Mayuko Yamamoto
  - Noriko Tomita
  - Tomohide Shimbo

== Local broadcasting stations ==
- Toshifumi Takeshima (Akita Television), play-by-play announcer for the Akita Northern Happinets
- Yuichi Uwaizumi (Mainichi Broadcasting System, Inc. (MBS)), on "Seyanen!".
- Saki Yagi (MBS), appearing on "Chichin Pui Pui", a news anchor.
- Hiroko Matsukawa (MBS), appearing on "Chichin Pui Pui"
- Hiroshi Shibata (Asahi Broadcasting Corporation (ABC))
- Ukari Kita (ABC), an assistant of "Ohayo Asahi desu" (Good morning. This is ABC.).
- Hiroyuki Yamamoto (Kansai Telecasting Corporation (KTV)), host of "Nambo de Nambo" and "Supernews Anchor".
- Yuzuru Okayasu (KTV), a news anchor.
- Yasuo Toyota (KTV), a news anchor.
- Tetsushi Baba (KTV), a sports announcer (horse racing, baseball, and Osaka International Ledies Marathon)
- Keiko Fujimoto (KTV)
- Natsumi Sugimoto (KTV)
- Anna Kobayashi (Yomiuri Telecasting Corporation (ytv))
- Takashi Miura (ytv), appearing on "Zoom-In Super", "Narutomo!", and an announcer on "Japan International Birdman Rally"
- Toshiharu Harada (Osaka Broadcasting Corporation (OBC, Radio Osaka))
- Toshihiko Fujii (Chukyo TV. Broadcasting Co., Ltd. (CTV))
- Others

== Former announcers ==
- Free-lance announcers
  - Name (belonged stations)
  - Akira Fukuzawa (NTV)- host of game show "Maka-joshiki no Ana" (NTV) and comedy show "Enta no Kamisama" (NTV). Also co-anchor of newsmagazine "Bankisha" (NTV) and sports commentator.
  - Masataka Itsumi (FTN) - died while an active free announcer
  - Mino Monta (QR) - host of "Mino Monta no Asazuba" (TBS), "Omoikkiri TV" (NTV), "Groovy After School MAX!" (TBS), "Amazing Animals" (TBS), etc.
  - Etsuko Komiya (EX) - a news anchor at TV Asahi.
  - Shohei Kuwabara (KTV) - narrator on "Go! Go! Gulliver-kun".
  - Kyoko Uchida (CX) - ex co-anchor of late-night sports news "Sport" and host of some variety shows.
- Others
  - Name (belonged stations)
  - Jun'ichi Sumi (MBS) - one of three hosts of "Chichin Pui Pui".
  - Shio Chino (CX) - called "Chinopan".
  - Sosuke Sumitani (NTV) - he worked as a reporter of Dotch Cooking Show (Produced by ytv) but fired after he was found to have filmed up a schoolgirl's skirt using a mobile camera phone.
