= Akita Northern Happinets =

Professional basketball team in Akita, Japan

- Conference: East
- Division: First
- Leagues: B.League
- Founded: 2010; 16 years ago
- History: bj league (2010–2016); B.League (2016–present)
- Arena: CNA Arena Akita
- Capacity: 5,000
- Location: Akita, Akita
- Team colors: Pink, Gold, Black
- President: Yuki Mizuno (fr)
- Head coach: Kenzo Maeda
- Conference titles: 2 bj league Eastern Conference champions (2014, 2015)
- Website: Happinets.com
Home	Away	Third

The Akita Northern Happinets are a Japanese professional basketball team based in Akita. The team competes in the B.League Premier, the highest division of the B.League, as a member of the Eastern Conference. The team plays its home games at CNA Arena Akita.

The team was formed as an expansion team of the bj league in 2010 and found success for the first time in 2013–14, finishing their fourth season as league runners-up. They went on to finish as runners-up for the second year in a row in 2014–15 and in third place in 2015–16, the final season of the bj league.

== History ==
Akita Prefecture's connection with basketball has historically lay with Noshiro Technical High School, which has won a total of 58 national-level championships, and the Isuzu corporate team (Akita Isuzu Motors, currently the Yokohama Giga Spirits), which was based in Akita from 1955 until 1987. Following the formation of the independent bj league in 2006, a committee was formed to investigate the formation of a professional club within the prefecture in 2007 but was unsuccessful. In June 2008 another association was formed to pursue a bj league franchise licence and a pre-season match between the Sendai 89ers and Niigata Albirex BB was held a few months later. In January 2009 Akita Pro Basketball Club Co., Ltd. was established and in the following May was granted a licence to enter the 2010-11 bj league season. The team's name was announced at a pre-season match hosted in Akita between the 89ers and Hamamatsu Higashimikawa Phoenix in September 2009.

=== 2010-11 season ===
The Happinets entered the Eastern Conference of the bj league in October 2010 as one of three expansion teams. The Shimane Susanoo Magic and Miyazaki Shining Suns joined the Western Conference, taking the league to a total of 16 teams. For their first season the Happinets signed Seiichi Oba as general manager and former Shiga Lakestars coach Robert Pierce as head coach. 39-year-old Akita native and Noshiro Tech alumnus Makoto Hasegawa was acquired from Niigata in exchange for a first-round draft pick and took on a player-manager role. The team drafted Jun Nakanishi and Ryosuke Mizumachi in the expansion draft, Yuki Nobuhira in the second round of the rookie draft and Makoto Sawaguchi in the development draft. The team was unable to reach a deal with Nakanishi, who instead signed with Rizing Fukuoka before the start of the season. Happinets' inaugural home game was held at the Akita Prefectural Gymnasium in October.

=== 2011-12 season ===
In November 2011 the team signed Curtis Terry, brother of NBA player Jason Terry, to replace the injured Brandon Wallace. After 14 games Terry was released from the club in January due to his arrest for theft from a convenience store.

=== 2013-15 seasons ===
Has emerged as a strong league power, and won a conference title two years in a row.

=== 2016-17 season ===
ANH struggled throughout the season and were relegated to second division.

=== 2017-18 season ===
Akita finished the regular season with a 54–6 record, defeated Kumamoto Volters in the B2 playoffs and were promoted to B1.

=== 2018-19 season ===
The team suffered its 11th consecutive defeat, However, Akita was not relegated and remained in the B1 league.

=== 2019-20 season ===
TDK logo

Coach Pep left, and Maeda was promoted from assistant coach to bench boss. The 10th anniversary team got sponsorship deals from electronics company TDK Corporation. Tokyo Denki Kagaku sponsored Liga ACB team, TDK Manresa between 1985 and 2000.New practice facilities, near the Akita Station, was completed in December. Two games were played without spectators due to the COVID-19 pandemic in March.

=== 2021-22 season ===
Assistant coach Makoto Tanaka was arrested for drink-driving on July 17, 2021. The team clinched their first B. League playoff berth on May 8, 2022.

=== 2022-23 season ===
Amida Brimah was released by Happinets on August 29, 2022. He originally signed for this season on July 13.

== Current roster ==
Akita Northern Happinets roster
Players
Coaches

Pos.	No.	Nat.	Name	Ht.	Wt.
G/F	0	(Taiwan) (Senegal)	Gadiaga, Mohammad Al Bachir	1.89 m (6 ft 2 in)	92 kg (203 lb)
CG	2	(Japan)	Kurihara, Tsubasa	1.82 m (6 ft 0 in)	90 kg (198 lb)
SG	5	(Japan)	Taguchi, Shigehiro	1.85 m (6 ft 1 in)	84 kg (185 lb)
G/F	6	(Japan)	Akaho, Raita	1.84 m (6 ft 0 in)	94 kg (207 lb)
PG	11	(Japan)	Kumagai, Ko	1.73 m (5 ft 8 in)	70 kg (154 lb)
SG	12	(Japan)	Motoda, Taiyo	1.90 m (6 ft 3 in)	82 kg (181 lb)
PF	15	(United States)	Leissner, Tanner	2.03 m (6 ft 8 in)	105 kg (231 lb)
CG	17	(Japan)	Nakayama, Takuya	1.82 m (6 ft 0 in)	82 kg (181 lb)
PG	20	(Japan)	Oguri, Akitoshi	1.74 m (5 ft 9 in)	75 kg (165 lb)
C/PF	21	(Nigeria)	Mekowulu, Christian	2.05 m (6 ft 9 in)	110 kg (243 lb)
C/PF	24	(France)	Morin, Yannis	2.08 m (6 ft 10 in)	95 kg (209 lb)
G/F	33	(Japan)	Kanakubo, Kakeru	1.91 m (6 ft 3 in)	82 kg (181 lb)
PF	77	(Japan)	Tsuchiya, Alistair Tokio	2.01 m (6 ft 7 in)	96 kg (212 lb)
C/PF		(New Zealand)	Wetzell, Yanni	2.08 m (6 ft 10 in)	109 kg (240 lb)

Head coach

(Japan) Kenzo Maeda

Assistant coach(es)

(United States) Mick Downer
(Japan) Shogo Fukuda
(Japan) Atsuto Nara

Legend

- (C) Team captain
- Injured

- Roster
Updated: April 30, 2025

Note: Flags indicate national team eligibility at FIBA-sanctioned events. Players may hold other non-FIBA nationalities not displayed.

== Management ==
Akita Northern Happinets Co., Ltd.
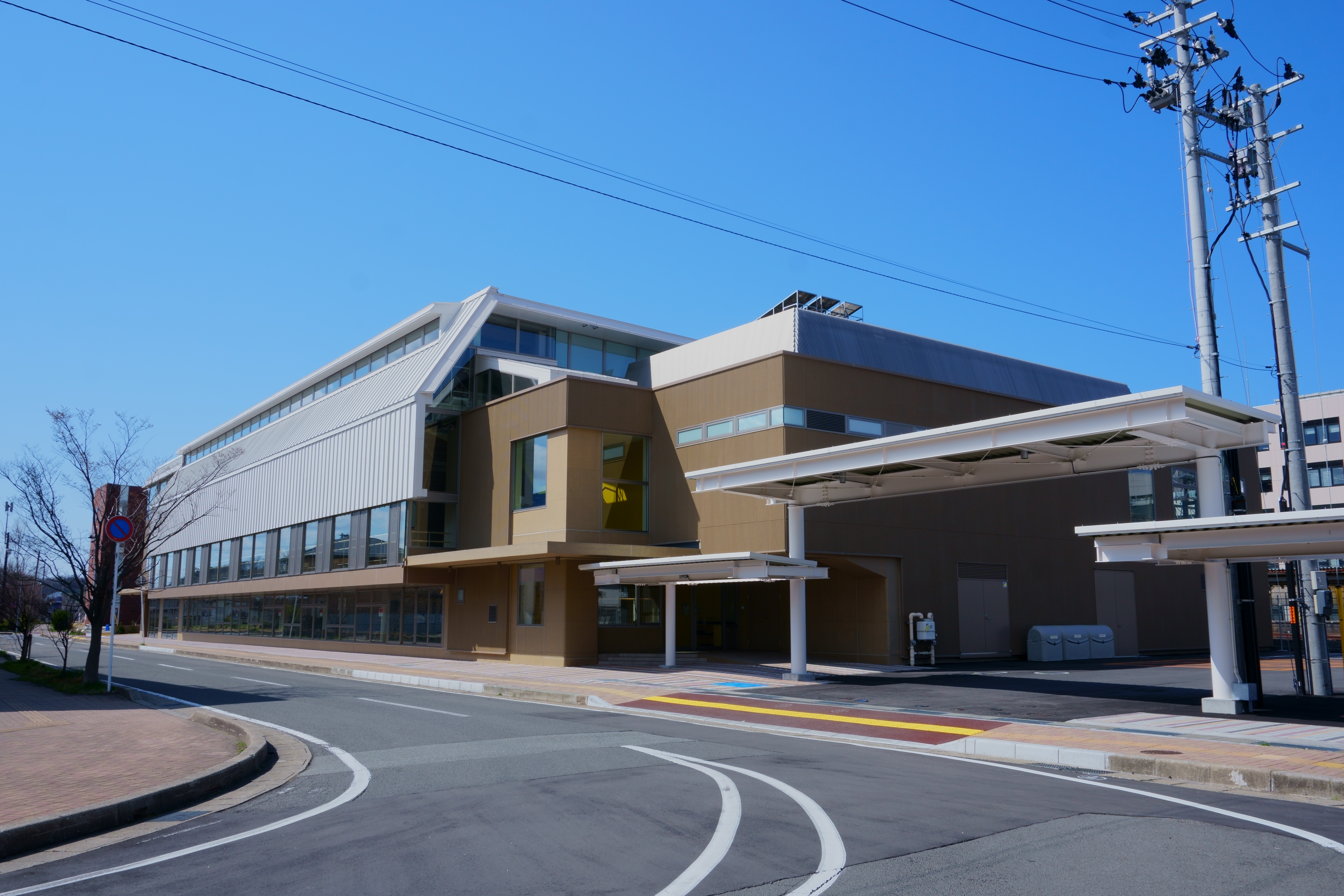
- The headquarters are housed in the Akita Northern Gate Square
- Type: Kabushiki gaisha
- Industry: Sports
- Founded: 30 January 2009
- Headquarters: Akita Northern Gate Square 2F, Nakadori 7-chome 1 2-3, Akitashi. Akitaken 010-0001, Japan
- Area served: Akita Prefecture
- Key people: Yuki Mizuno
- Website: northern-happinets.com

=== General manager ===
- (Japan) Seiichi Oba

=== Managers and trainers ===
- (Japan) Yukio Kodaka
- (Japan) Shintaro Tahara
- (Japan) Itsuki Midorikawa
- (Japan) Ryohei Sugano

==== Former managers and trainers ====
- Shigeru Takeuchi
- Kento Yamasawa

=== Basketball academy ===
- (Japan) Shoya Uchimura
- (Japan) Yu Yoshimoto

=== Bicky ===
- (Japan) unknown

=== Noted employee ===
- Yasuhiko Takahashi (Wheel gymnastics champion)

== Notable former players ==
- (Japan) Seiya Ando
- (United States) Antonio Burks
- (United States) Marshall Brown
- (United States) Alex Davis
- (United States) Jordan Glynn
- (United States) Will Graves
- (Japan) Makoto Hasegawa
- (United States) Sek Henry
- (United States) Justin Keenan
- (Canada) Scott Morrison
- (United States) Kevin Palmer
- (United States) Richard Roby
- (Japan) Kazuhiro Shoji
- (United States) Deshawn Stephens
- (Japan) Shigehiro Taguchi
- (Japan) Kenichi Takahashi
- (Japan) Yuki Togashi
- (United States) Brandon Wallace

== Season-by-season record ==
Akita Northern Happinets season-by-season record
Season	League	Finish	G	W	L	W-L	GB	Play-offs	PG	PW	PL	PWL
2010–11	Bj League	East 6th	50	18	32	.360	24	Lost in First Round to Niigata	2	0	2	.000
2011-12	Bj League	East 3rd	52	28	24	.538	9	Lost in Second Round to Yokohama	6	3	3	.500
2012-13	Bj League	East 5th	52	26	26	.500	8	Lost in Second Round to Niigata	5	2	3	.400
2013-14	Bj League	East 3rd	52	40	12	.759	2	Eastern Conference Champions	6	5	1	.833
2014–15	Bj League	East 1st	52	41	11	.788	-	Eastern Conference Champions	7	5	2	.714
2015–16	Bj League	East 3rd	52	35	17	.673	4	3rd place	6	5	1	.833
2016–17	B.League	East 5th	60	18	42	.300	31	relegated to B2
2017–18	B.League2	East 1st	60	54	6	.900	-	B2 Runners-up	5	3	2	.600
2018–19	B.League	East 5th	60	17	43	.283	35	-
2019–20	B.League	East 5th	41	19	22	.463	13	-
2020–21	B.League	East 7th	59	28	31	.475	20.5	-
2021–22	B.League	East 5th	54	31	23	.574	9	Lost in First Round to Ryukyu	2	0	2	.000
2022–23	B.League	East 4th	60	29	31	.483	24
2023–24	B.League	East 5th	60	30	30	.500	21
2024–25	B.League	East 4th	56	27	29	.482	19
Totals	B.League		450	199	251	.442			2	0	2	.000
Totals	Bj League		310	188	122	.606			32	20	12	.625
Totals	B.League2		60	54	6	.900			5	3	2	.600

=== Team statistics ===
Year	Lg	GP	MP	FG(%)	3P(%)	FT(%)	RPG	APG	SPG	BPG	PPG	OPPG
2010–11	bj	50	10050	.414	.324	.620	49.3	15.5	5.8	2.0	79.4	84.3
2011–12	bj	52	10425	.408	.323	.669	37.3	15.6	8.0	2.2	73.8	80.2
2012–13	bj	52	10475	.415	.334	.620	33.4	15.8	6.8	2.5	77.4	76.9
2013–14	bj	52	10475	.457	.354	.692	40.0	19.4	7.1	3.0	90.2	81.1
2014–15	bj	52	10475	.484	.375	.679	38.8	20.3	7.1	4.1	89.2	77.1
2015–16	bj	52	10475	.462	.359	.692	46.3	19.7	7.4	3.1	83.9	75.9
2016–17	B1	60	12150	.425	.342	.684	37.5	12.1	6.3	1.9	70.4	74.3
2017–18	B2	60	12000	.437	.339	.631	40.7	20.6	11.9	3.5	80.0	67.7
2018–19	B1	60	12025	.421	.307	.696	36.8	18.3	8.2	2.9	71.3	78.2
2019–20	B1	41	8200	.430	.306	.711	35.8	19.1	9.7	3.0	75.5	73.9
2020–21	B1	59	11875	.435	.319	.696	35.5	20.9	9.1	4.0	77.5	78.1
2021–22	B1	54	10850	.446	.378	.751	36.1	20.8	8.9	2.7	78.7	75.7
2022–23	B1	60	12000	.428	.342	.732	39.0	22.1	7.3	2.0	78.6	77.7
2023–24	B1	60	12000	.411	.326	.710	40.5	18.9	6.5	2.1	74.2	75.2
2024–25	B1	56	11000	.411	.329	.701	36.9	20.3	8.3	2.3	73.4	74.5

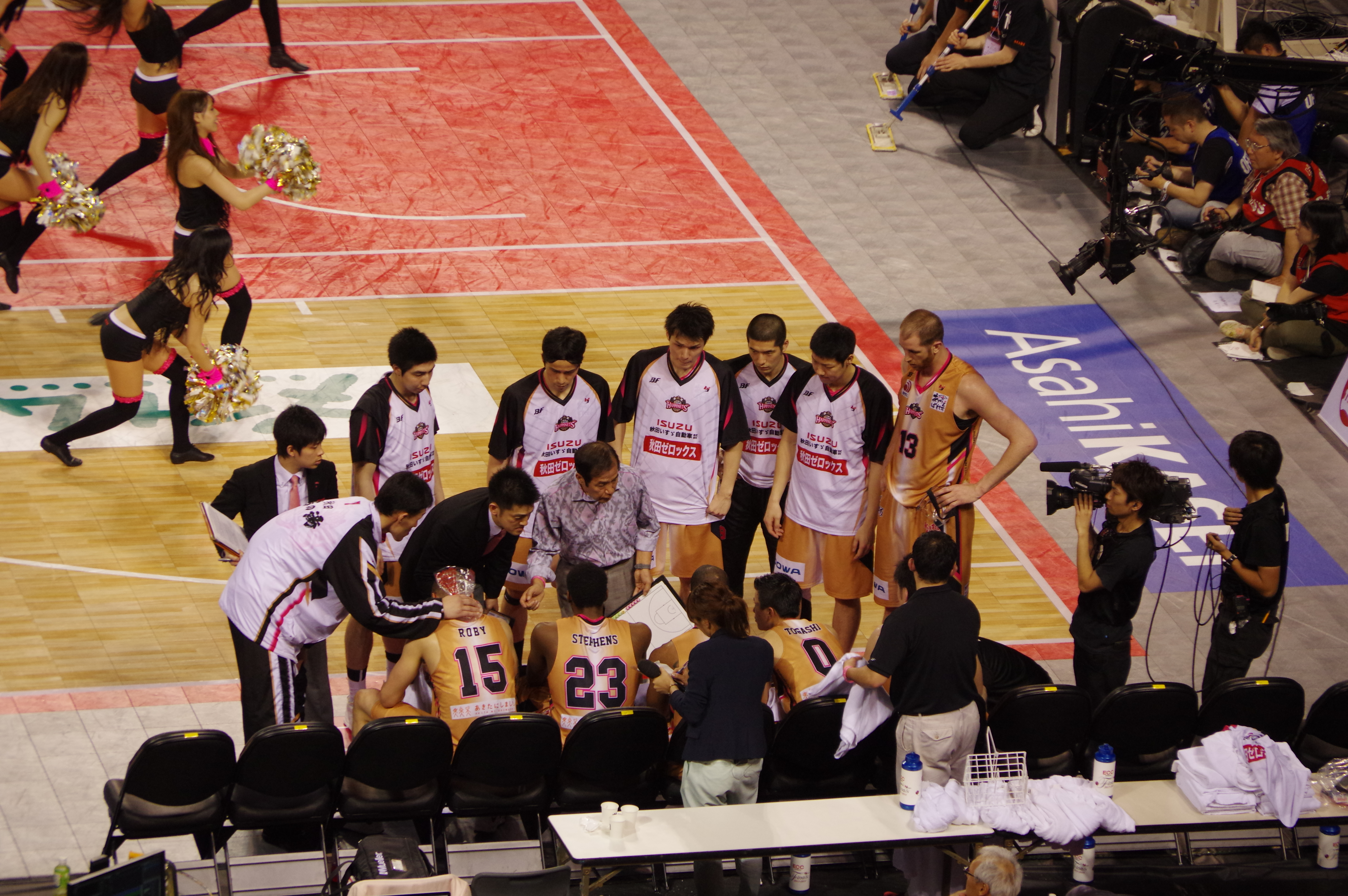
Happinets in 2014

== Other honors and titles ==
Tohoku Cup

- Champions (5): 2012, 2013, 2016, 2021, 2022

Tohoku Early Cup

- Champions (2): 2017, 2019

== Head coaches ==
Years	Coach	Record
2010–2011	(United States) Bob Pierce	18–32
2011–2014	(Japan) Kazuo Nakamura	94-62
2014–2017	(Japan) Makoto Hasegawa	94–70
2017–2019	(Spain) Josep Clarós	71-49
2019–present	(Japan) Kenzo Maeda	47-53
2010–present	Total	354-266

=== Assistant coaches ===
- (Japan) Yoichi Motoyasu
- (United States) Joe Cook
- (Japan) Kenjiro Maeda
- (United States) Kevin Braswell

== Uniforms ==
HOME
2016 - 19	2019 - 20	2020 - 21

AWAY
2016 - 19	2019 - 20	2020 - 21

Other
2020 - 21
FANS
ユニフォーム

== Cheerleading squad ==
Happinets Cheer Dance Team
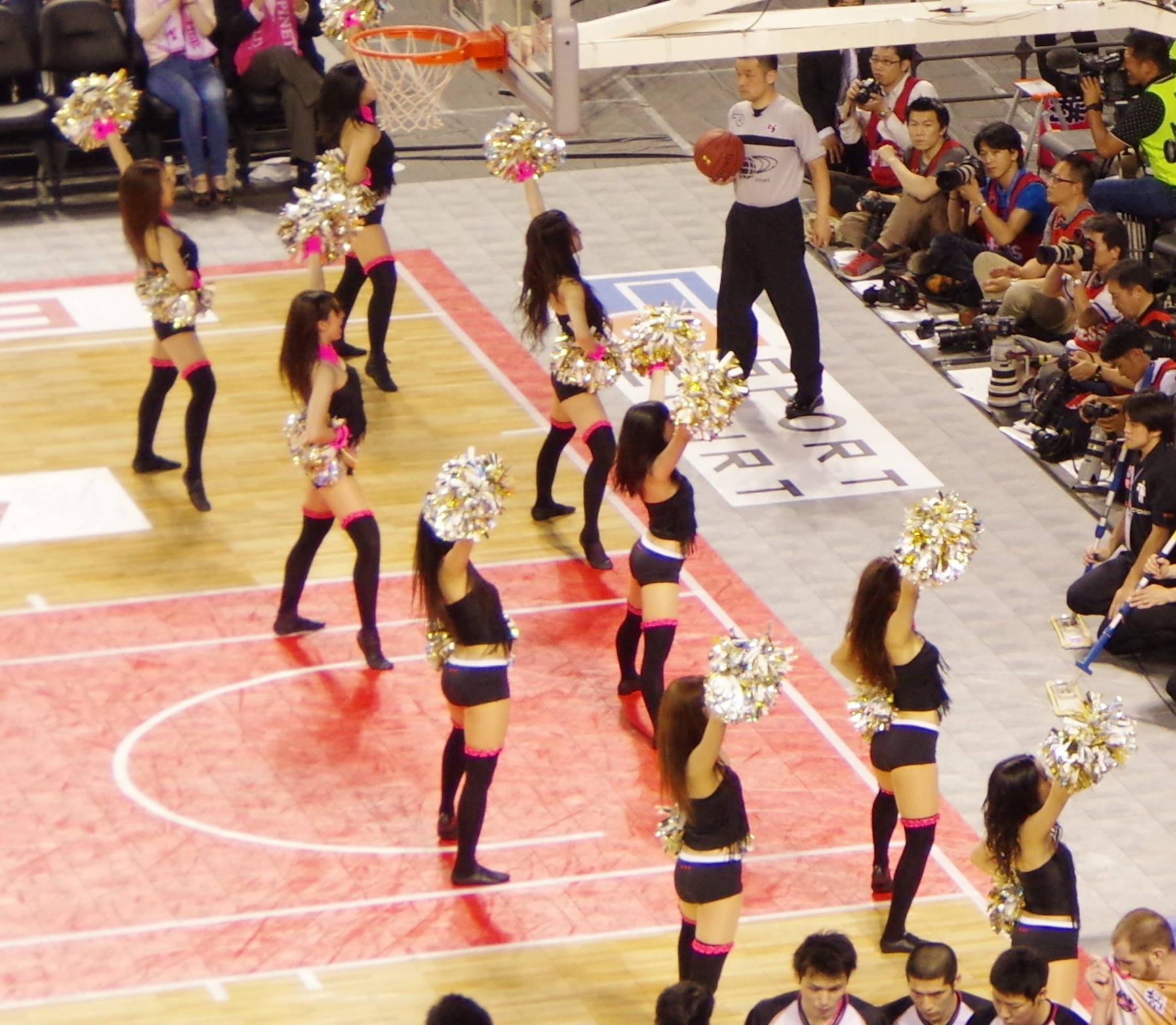

Akita Northern Happinets Cheer Dance Team
- Formation: 2010-present
- Director: Mineko Abe
- Affiliations: Happinets Cheer Dance Team
- Membership: 9
- Website: Cheer homepage

The Akita Northern Happinets Cheer Dance Team are the official B.League Cheerleading squad representing Happinets. The group performs at CNA Arena Akita, the home court of the Happinets. The squad also has a "Junior Cheer School Programme", for young women aged 5–12.

=== Director ===
- Mineko Abe

=== Instructor ===
- Aimi Sukagawa

=== Members ===
- Ikumi
- So
- Nene
- Yumi
- Kanon
- Nanami
- Rio
- Shiho
- Jr-Rio

== Mascot ==
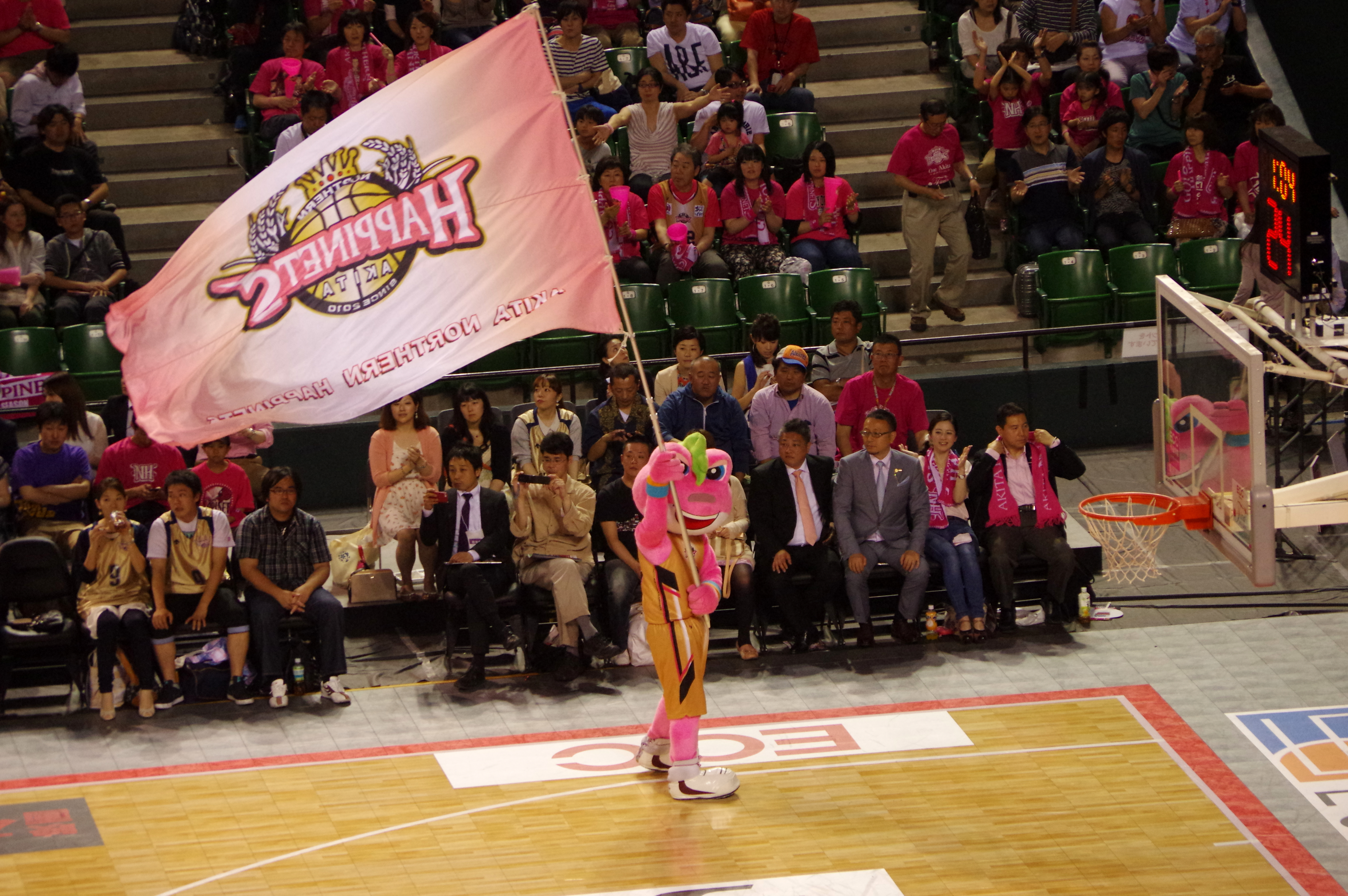
Bicky

Bicky is the official mascot of the Akita Northern Happinets. The Frog wears #82 and is able to slam-dunk. He is 182 cm tall and weighs 82 kg. Happinets introduced a new mascot Rana, Bicky's girl friend, on June 26, 2020. University HOSP man is the unofficial mascot.

== Arenas & Facilities ==
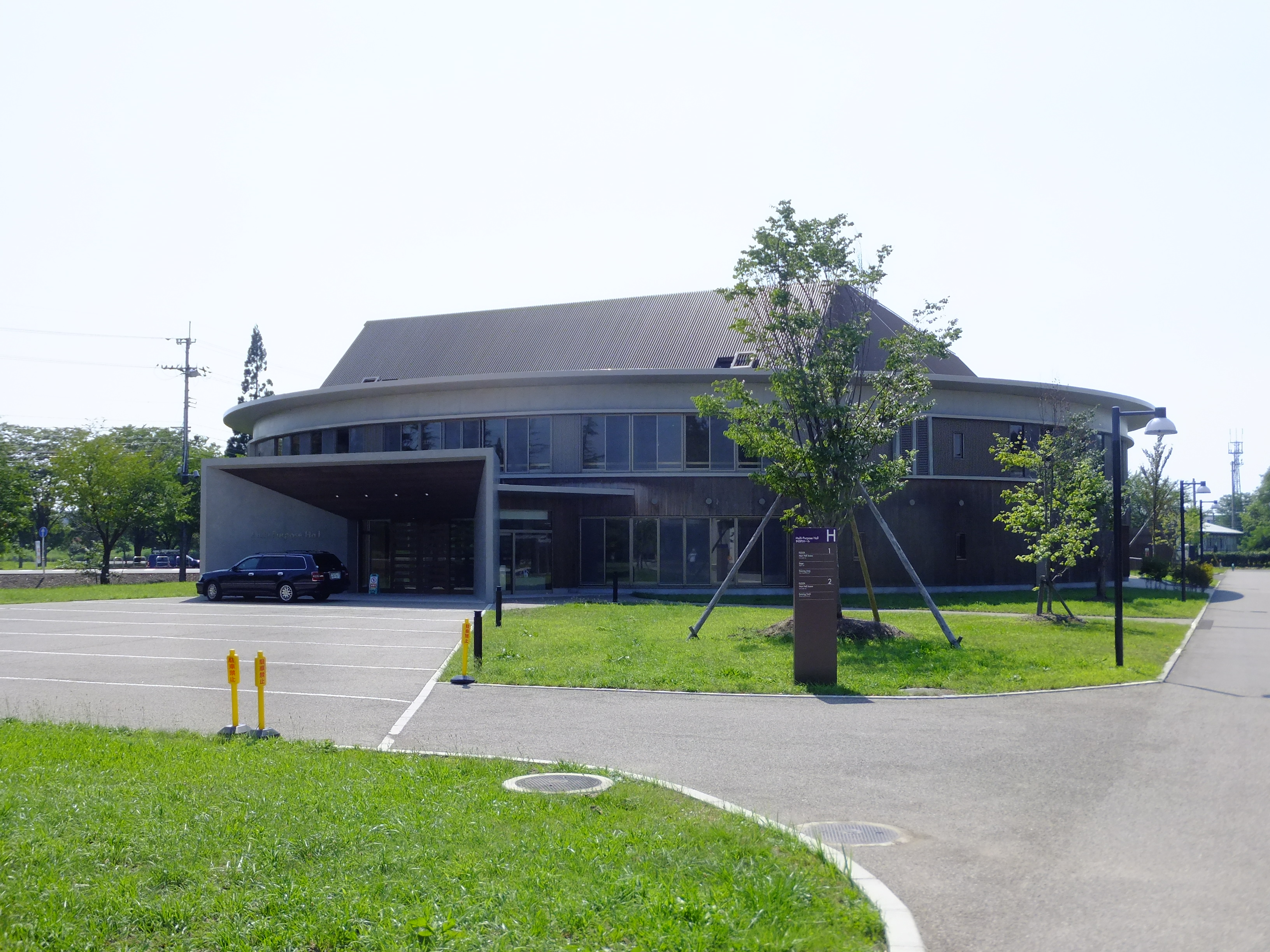
Akita International University Suda Hall

The Happinets play their home games at CNA Arena Akita, their home since 2016. During their time in the bj league, the Happinets played their home games at the Akita Prefectural Gymnasium. Another home, Nices Arena is an indoor sporting arena located in Yurihonjo. A new prefectural gymnasium will be built in 2026. The team has practice facilities at the Akita Northern Gate Square, Akita Bank Gymnasium, Akita Xerox Sports Square and Akita International University Suda Hall. They also build muscle at Varsity Weight Room in Yabase, Akita. Happinets players love to take spa at Youland Hotel Yabase in Akita. (Tattooed players have special privileges to take a bath.)

== "Crazy Pink" phenomenon ==
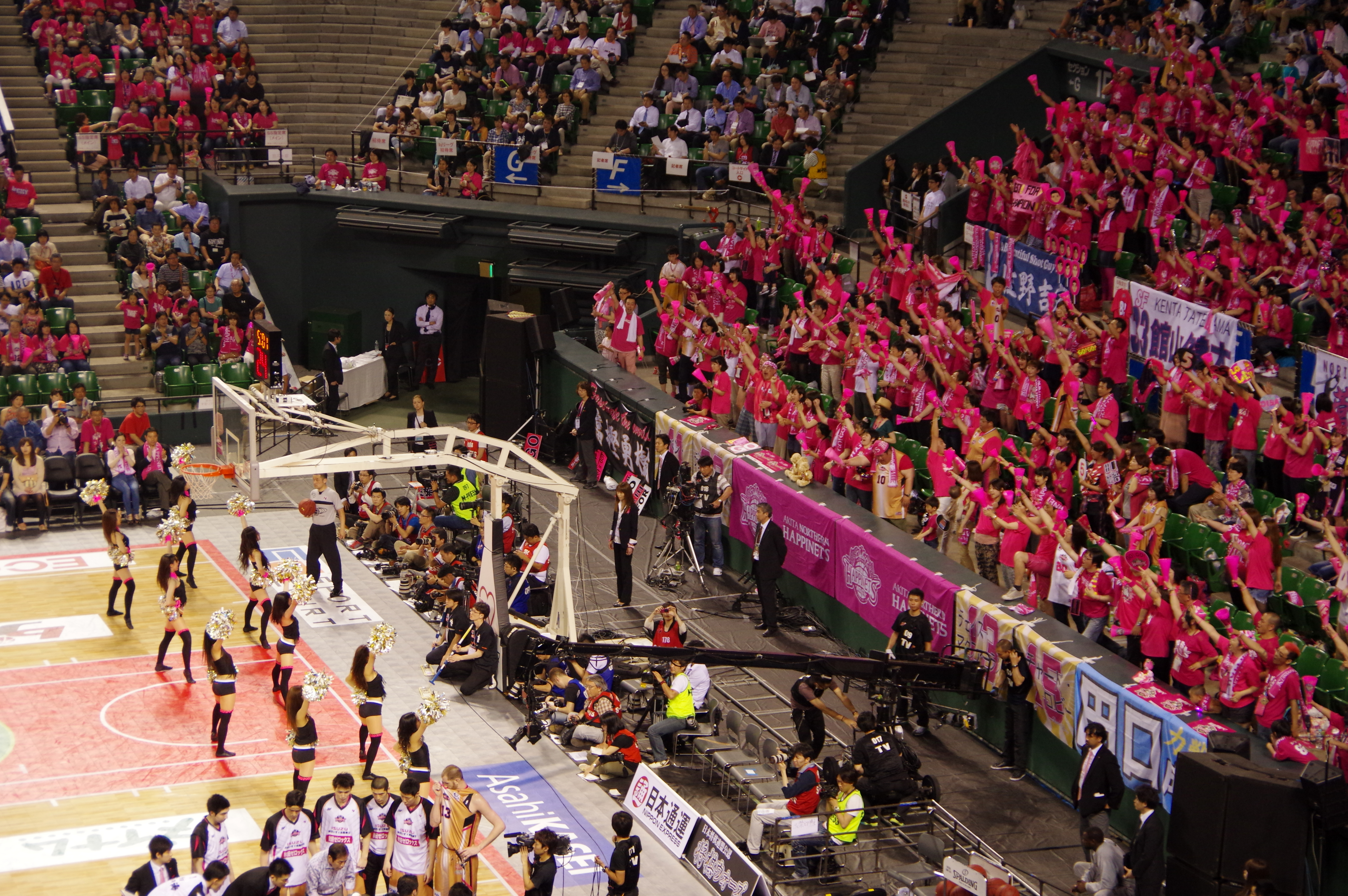
Crazy Pinks at Ariake Coliseum

The Akita Northern Happinets fan base is commonly referred to as "Crazy Pink." The group is noted for its consistent attendance at away games, where the number of supporters can occasionally match or exceed that of the home team. The hoop-crazed fans light up arena with "Bigabiga", pink glow sticks and sing the prefectural anthem before the game. The Happinets home court rocks with another stadium anthem "Fly Again" by Man with a Mission, and CNA Arena Akita is one of the hottest and loudest basketball venues in Asia. The Akita Airport limousine buses have the painted images of the Happinets and Blaublitz Akita.

== Kit ==
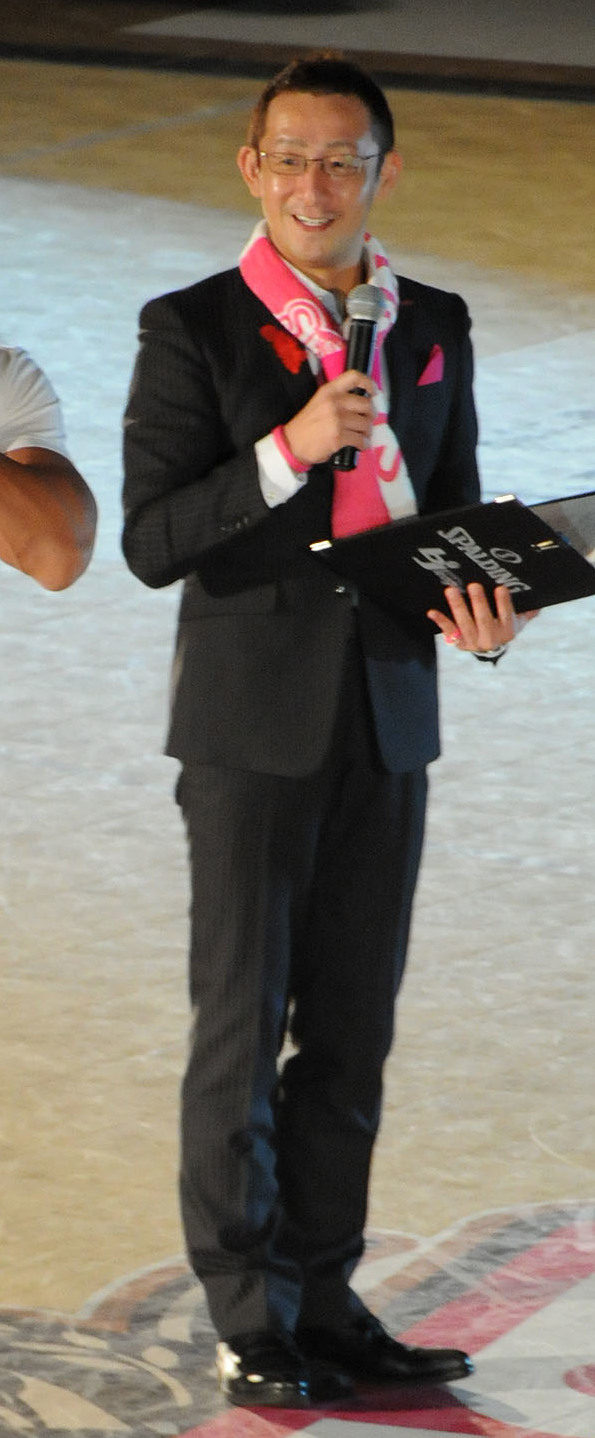
Emcee Hisato Hoizumi

=== Manufacturer ===
Year	Manufacturer
2010–2012	Gambax
2012–2014	Bull Fight
2014–2016	Mizuno
2016–2020	Under Armour
2020–present	Fila

== Media ==
=== Radio ===
The Happinets players' talk show is aired occasionally on ABS. The Happinets don't have any play-by-play radio broadcasting.

==== Programs ====
- ABS - Akita wo sakebe Northern Happinets
- ABS - Nantettatte Nichiyou ha Sports
- ABS - Kosaka Rika no Cheer Happinets
- FM Akita - Weekly Northern Happinets (Takashi Hatakeyama)
- FM Hanabi - Uchiagero Go! Go! Akita Northern Happinets!!

=== Television ===
SoftBank Group Corp. is estimated to have invested over ¥12 billion to get the broadcasting rights of B.League in 2016. The Happinets home game broadcasters are Toshifumi Takeshima (Akita Television, play-by-play announcer) and Hiroyuki Chida (JR Akita Peckers).

==== Programs ====
- AAB - Go Happinets!
