= Akita Northern Gate Square =

Anita Northern Gate Square

- 秋田ノーザンゲートスクエア

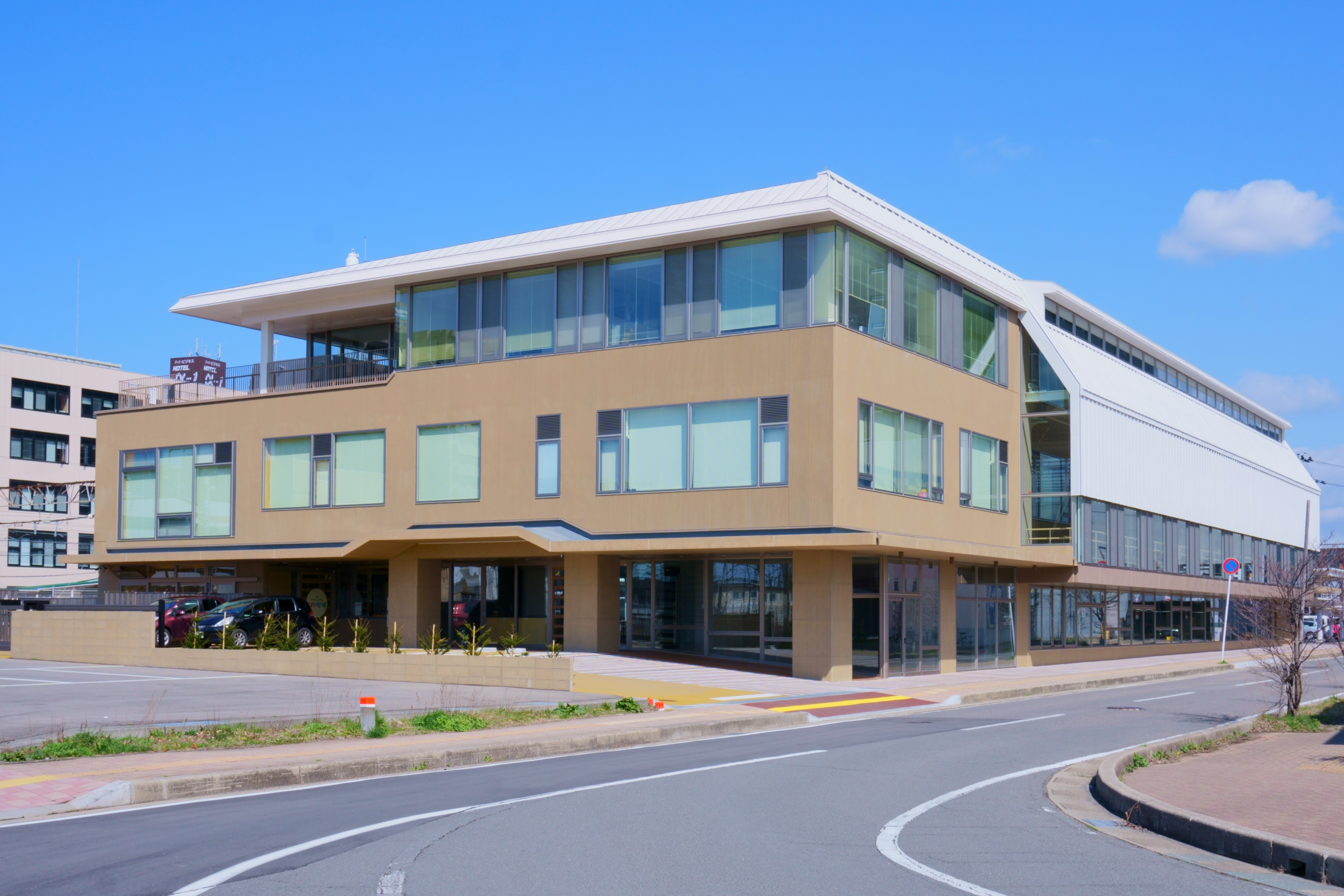
- Exterior (March 2020)

- Location within Akita Prefecture Location within Japan
- Interactive map of Akita Northern Gate Square
- Full name: Akita Northern Gate Square
- Location: 7-chome 1, Nakadori, Akita-shi, Japan 010-0001
- Coordinates: 39°42′53.2″N 140°07′49″E
- Elevation: 10 m (33 ft)
- Owner: East Japan Railway Company
- Operator: East Japan Railway Company
- Surface: Hardwood
- Scoreboard: Bodet
- Acreage: 7,358 m^{2} (79,200 sq ft)
- Public transit: Japan Railway Akita Station

Construction
- Groundbreaking: June 6, 2018
- Opened: December 17, 2019
- Cost: JPY 2billion
- Architects: JR East Design Corporation, Environment Design Institute
- Main contractor: Daiichi Kensetsu Co., LTD.

Tenants
- JR East Akita Peckers (practice facility, 2019-); Akita Northern Happinets (practice facility, 2020-)

Akita Northern Gate Square (秋田ノーザンゲートスクエア) is an indoor basketball arena in Akita, Akita, Japan. Groundbreaking and construction began in 2018, and it was opened on December 17, 2019. It is located adjacent to the JR Akita Station, and the home practice arena of JR East Akita Peckers basketball. Featuring Akita cedar ceiling frameworks and glass walls, the three-storey building also houses the practice facility and team headquarters of the Akita Northern Happinets of the B.League.

== Facilities ==
- Two full-sized basketball courts - 1,400 sqm, four Sportsystem basketball rings and eight wall mounted goals
- Happinets team store
- Joto Sports Orthopaedic Clinic
- Weight room (Bull weight lifting equipment)
- Monitoring room
- NBA-style locker rooms
- Running course
- Sannoh Gakuen Nursery school

== Gallery ==
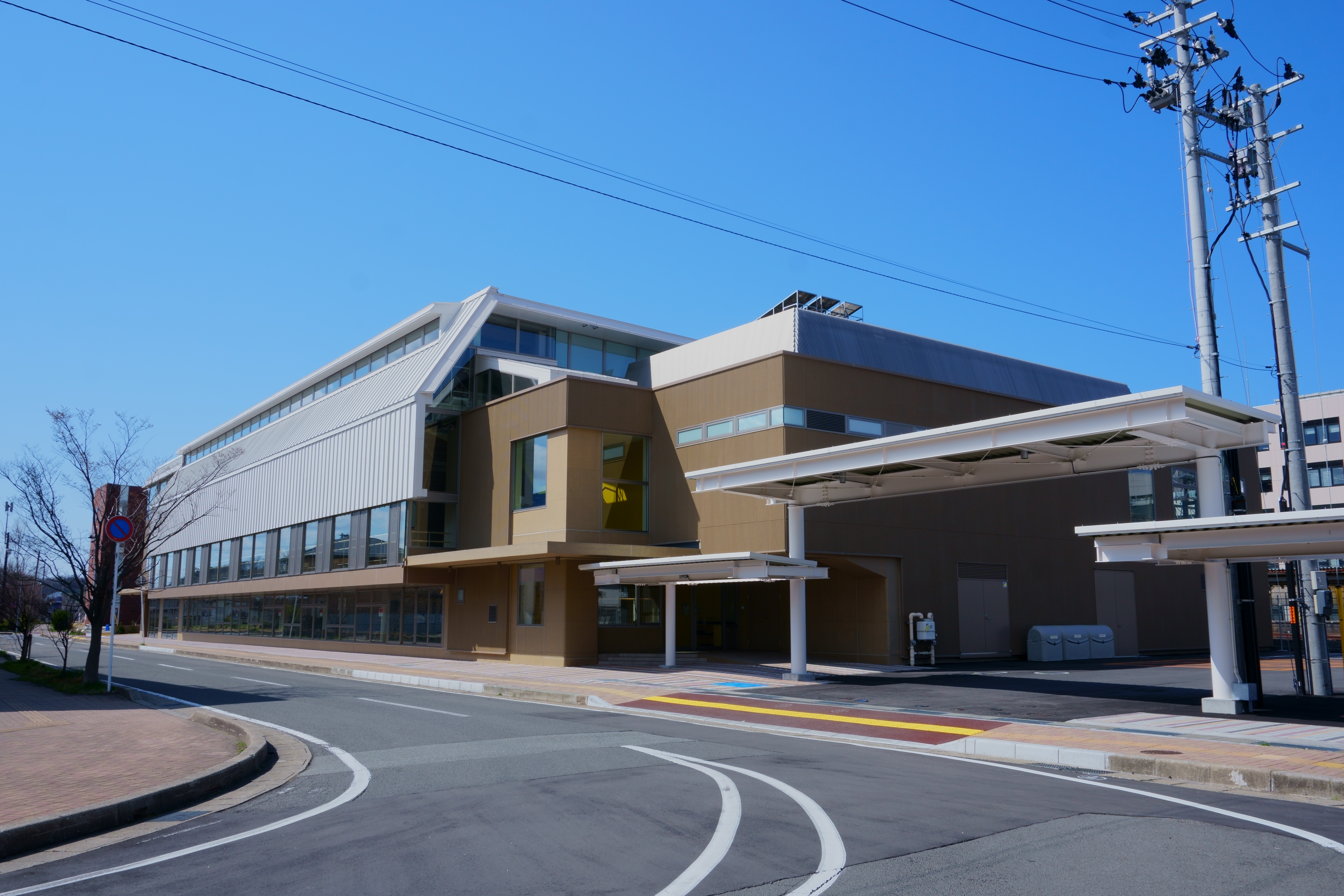

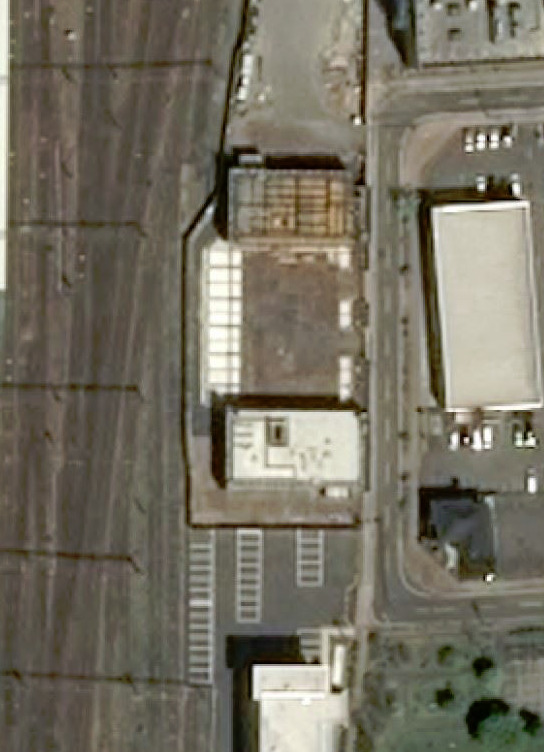
Under construction on 5 May 2019

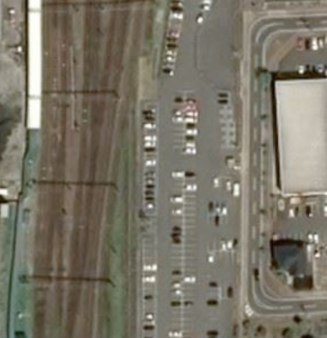
Building site

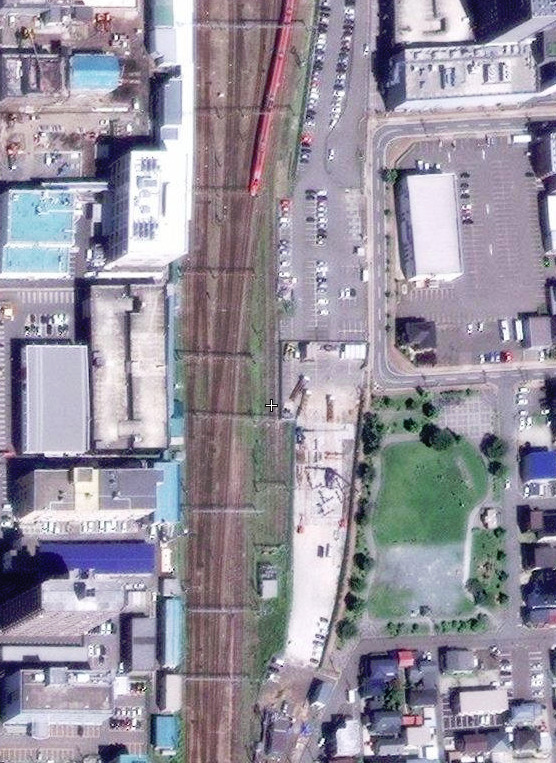
Joto Sports Orthopaedic Clinic building was under construction in September 2017
