= Yu Yoshimoto =

Japanese basketball player

Akita Northern Happinets
- Position: U18 Head coach
- League: B.League

Personal information
- Born: November 10, 1982 (age 44) Funakawaminato, Oga, Akita, Japan
- Listed height: 5 ft 7 in (1.70 m)
- Listed weight: 150 lb (68 kg)

Career information
- High school: Oga Technical (Oga, Akita)
- College: Tamagawa University
- Playing career: 2011–present

Career history
- 2011–2012: Akita Northern Happinets

Yu Yoshimoto (born November 10, 1982) is a Japanese former professional basketball player who played for the Akita Northern Happinets of the bj league in Japan. He currently teaches amateurs at the Happinets organization. He also plays for the Mitane Taikyo Kotooka of Noshiro Yamamoto Basketball Association.

== Career statistics ==
Legend
GP	Games played	GS	Games started	MPG	Minutes per game
FG%	Field goal percentage	3P%	3-point field goal percentage	FT%	Free throw percentage
RPG	Rebounds per game	APG	Assists per game	SPG	Steals per game
BPG	Blocks per game	PPG	Points per game	**Bold**	Career high

=== Regular season ===
Year	Team	GP	GS	MPG	FG%	3P%	FT%	RPG	APG	SPG	BPG	PPG
2011–12	Akita	7		0.9	.167	.250	.000	0.0	0.1	0.0	0.0	0.4

=== Playoffs ===
Year	Team	GP	GS	MPG	FG%	3P%	FT%	RPG	APG	SPG	BPG	PPG
2011-12	Akita	1	0	1.0	.500	.500	.000	0.0	0.0	0.0	0.0	3.0
