= Bob Pierce =

American basketball coach

Robert Pierce
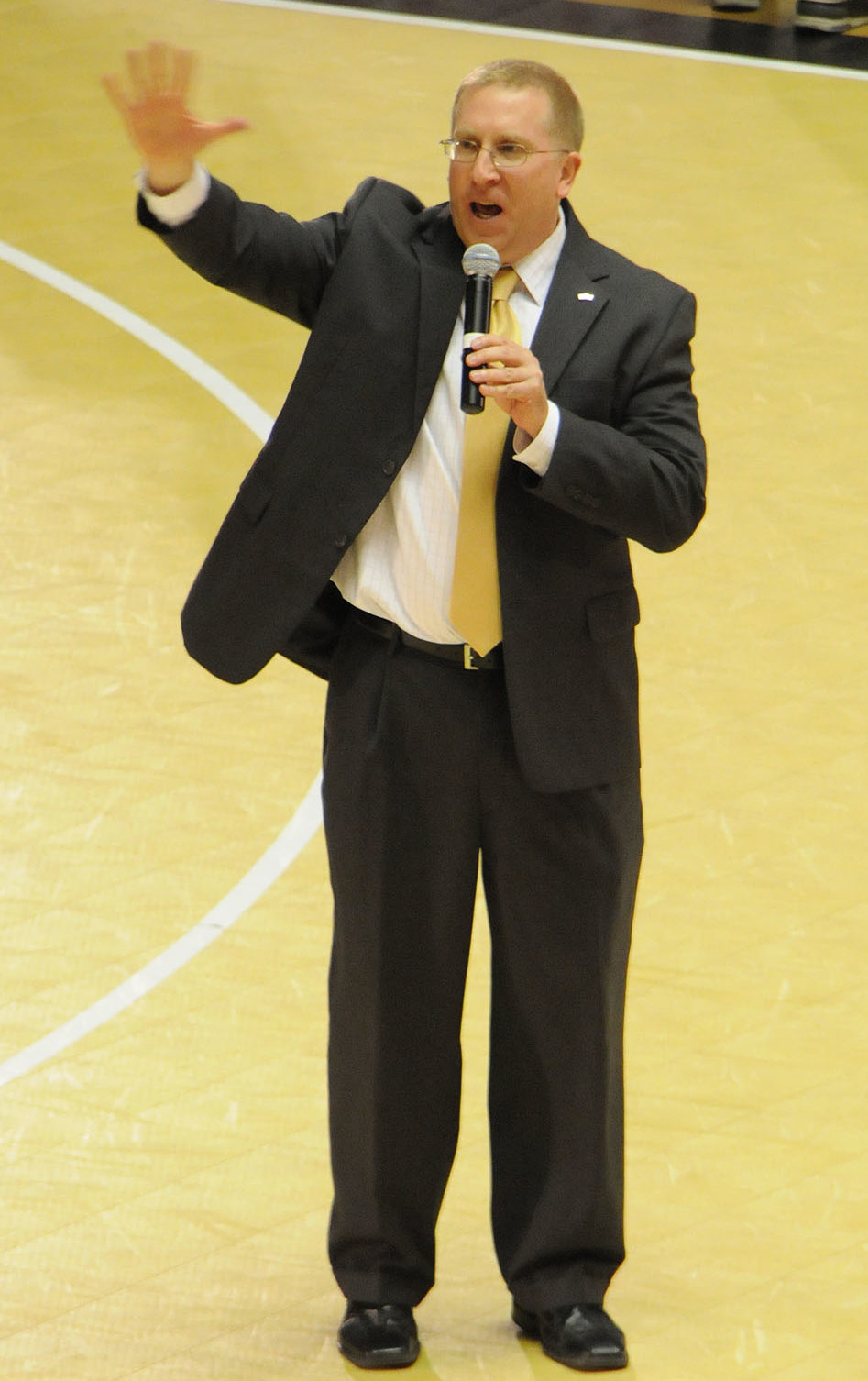
- Pierce at Akita Prefectural Gymnasium (2010)

Miami Heat
- Position: Scout
- League: NBA

Personal information
- Born: August 1, 1960 (age 66) Portland, Oregon, U.S.

Career information
- High school: Kalamazoo Central (Kalamazoo, Michigan)
- College: Biola
- Coaching career: 1984–present

Career history

Coaching
- 1984–1986: La Miranda HS
- 1986–1988: Westminster HS
- 1988–1993: USC (asst.)
- 1993–1995: Sunny Hills HS
- 1995–1997: Lewis & Clark (asst.)
- 1997–2000: Hitachi Rising Suns
- 2000–2001: Hitachi SunRockers
- 2001–2005: Excellence
- 2006–2007: Shenzhen Basketball Club
- 2008–2010: Shiga Lakestars
- 2010–2011: Akita Northern Happinets
- 2011–2013: Sendai 89ers
- 2015–2016: China Men's U18 National (asst.)
- 2002: Japan Men's National (asst.)

Robert Pierce (born August 1, 1960) is an American former professional basketball coach. He was the head coach for Sun Rockers Shibuya (1997–2001), Shiga Lakestars (2008–2010), Akita Northern Happinets (2010–2011), and the Sendai 89ers (2011–2013) in Japan and a former college basketball assistant coach for University of Southern California.

He can speak English, Japanese, Spanish, Chinese and Korean languages. Currently he is a Director of Instruction for the Five-Star Sports China, coaches the international school of Beijing men's basketball team, and serves for the Miami Heat of the NBA as the scout in China.

== Head coaching record ==
Legend
Regular season	G	Games coached	W	Games won	L	Games lost	W–L %	Win–loss %
Playoffs	PG	Playoff games	PW	Playoff wins	PL	Playoff losses	PW–L %	Playoff win–loss %

Team	Year	G	W	L	W–L%	Finish	PG	PW	PL	PW–L%	Result
Hitachi	1999-00	16	5	11	.313					–	
Hitachi	2000-01	21	6	15	.286	7th				–	Missed playoffs
Shiga	2008-09	52	19	33	.365	5th in Western	0	0	0	–	Missed playoffs
Shiga	2009-10	52	29	23	.558	4th in Western	2	0	2	.000	Lost in First Round
Akita	2010-11	50	18	32	.360	6th in Eastern	2	0	2	.000	Lost in First Round
Sendai	2011-12	52	25	27	.481	6th in Eastern	3	1	2	.333	Lost in First Round
Sendai	2012-13	34	13	21	.382	Fired	0	0	0	–	
Bj league totals		240	104	136	.433		7	1	6	.143	
