= Kenzo Maeda =

Japanese basketball coach (born 1982)

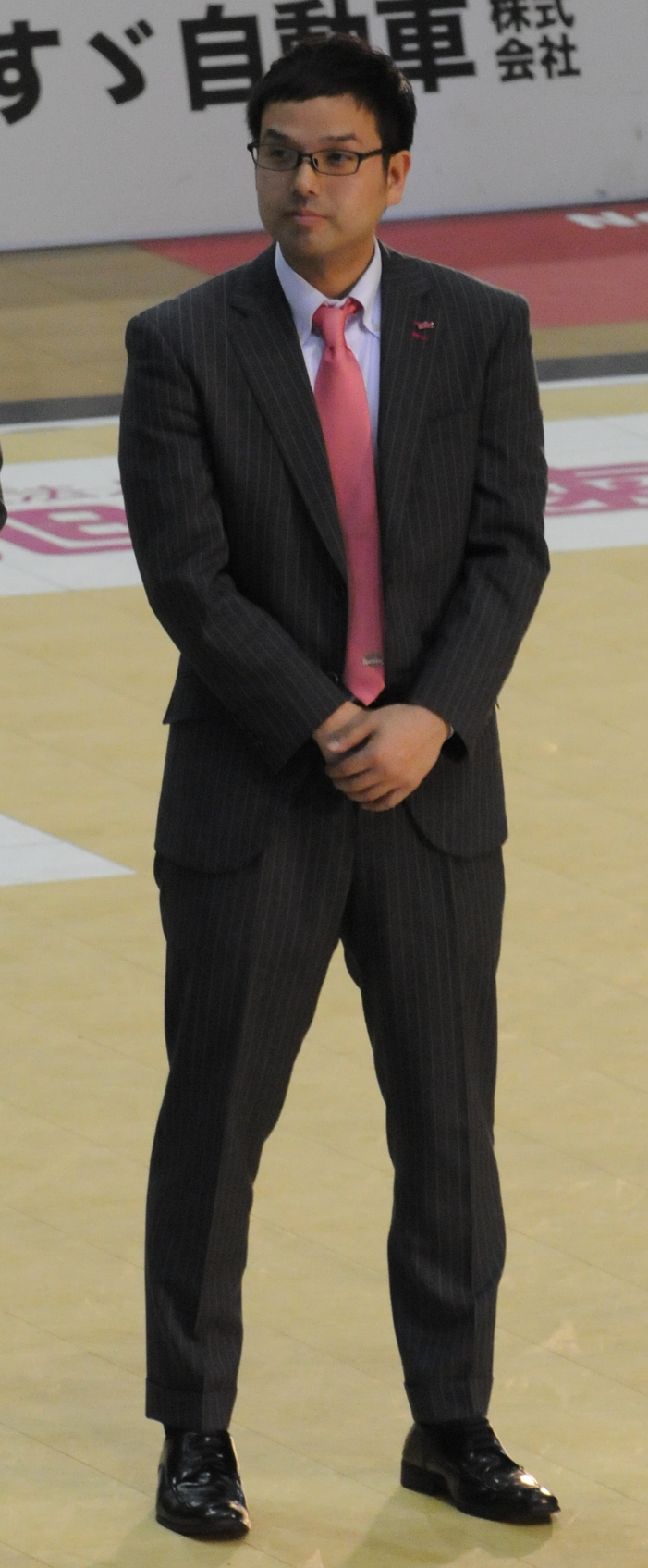
- Maeda in 2015

Chinese Taipei women's national basketball team
- Position: Head coach

Personal information
- Born: June 27, 1982 (age 44) Osaka, Japan
- Listed height: 5 ft 9 in (1.75 m)

Career information
- High school: Daisho Gakuen (Osaka, Japan)
- College: Osaka College of Foreign Languages; Bellevue University; University of Nebraska at Kearney (2004-06)
- Coaching career: 2007–present

Career history

Coaching
- 2007-2008: Human Academy Basketball College (asst.)
- 2008–2011: Takamatsu Five Arrows (asst.)
- 2011–2015: Takamatsu Five Arrows
- 2015–2019: Akita Northern Happinets (asst.)
- 2019–2025: Akita Northern Happinets
- 2026–present: Chinese Taipei (Women)

Kenzo Maeda (前田 顕蔵, Maeda Kenzō; born June 27, 1982) is a professional basketball coach who currently serves as a head coach for Chinese Taipei women's national basketball team in Taiwan and the former bench boss for the Takamatsu Five Arrows of the bj league. He also served as a support coach/translator for the Japan national basketball team. In April 2026, Maeda was named head coach of the Taiwan women's national basketball team.

== College statistics ==
Legend
GP	Games played	GS	Games started	MPG	Minutes per game
FG%	Field goal percentage	3P%	3-point field goal percentage	FT%	Free throw percentage
RPG	Rebounds per game	APG	Assists per game	SPG	Steals per game
BPG	Blocks per game	PPG	Points per game	**Bold**	Career high

Year	Team	GP	GS	MPG	FG%	3P%	FT%	RPG	APG	SPG	BPG	PPG
2004-05	UNK	11	0	5.1	.167	.125	.000	0.3	0.27	0.09	0.0	0.5
2005-06	UNK	12	0	3.0	.111	.200	.000	0.0	0.25	0.08	0.0	0.3

== Head coaching record ==
Legend
Regular season	G	Games coached	W	Games won	L	Games lost	W–L %	Win–loss %
Playoffs	PG	Playoff games	PW	Playoff wins	PL	Playoff losses	PW–L %	Playoff win–loss %

Team	Year	G	W	L	W–L%	Finish	PG	PW	PL	PW–L%	Result
Takamatsu	2011-12	52	2	50	.038	9th in Western	-	-	-	–	Missed playoffs
Takamatsu	2012-13	52	20	32	.385	9th in Western	-	-	-	–	Missed playoffs
Takamatsu	2013-14	52	23	29	.442	7th in Western	—	—	—	—	Missed playoffs
Takamatsu	2014-15	52	17	35	.327	8th in Western	2	0	2	.000	Lost in First Round
Akita	2019-20	41	19	22	.463	5th in Eastern	-	-	-	–	Canceled
Akita	2020-21	59	28	31	.475	7th in Eastern	-	-	-	–	Missed playoffs
Career		308	109	199	.354		2	0	2	.000	

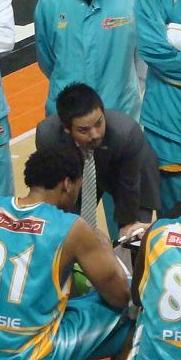

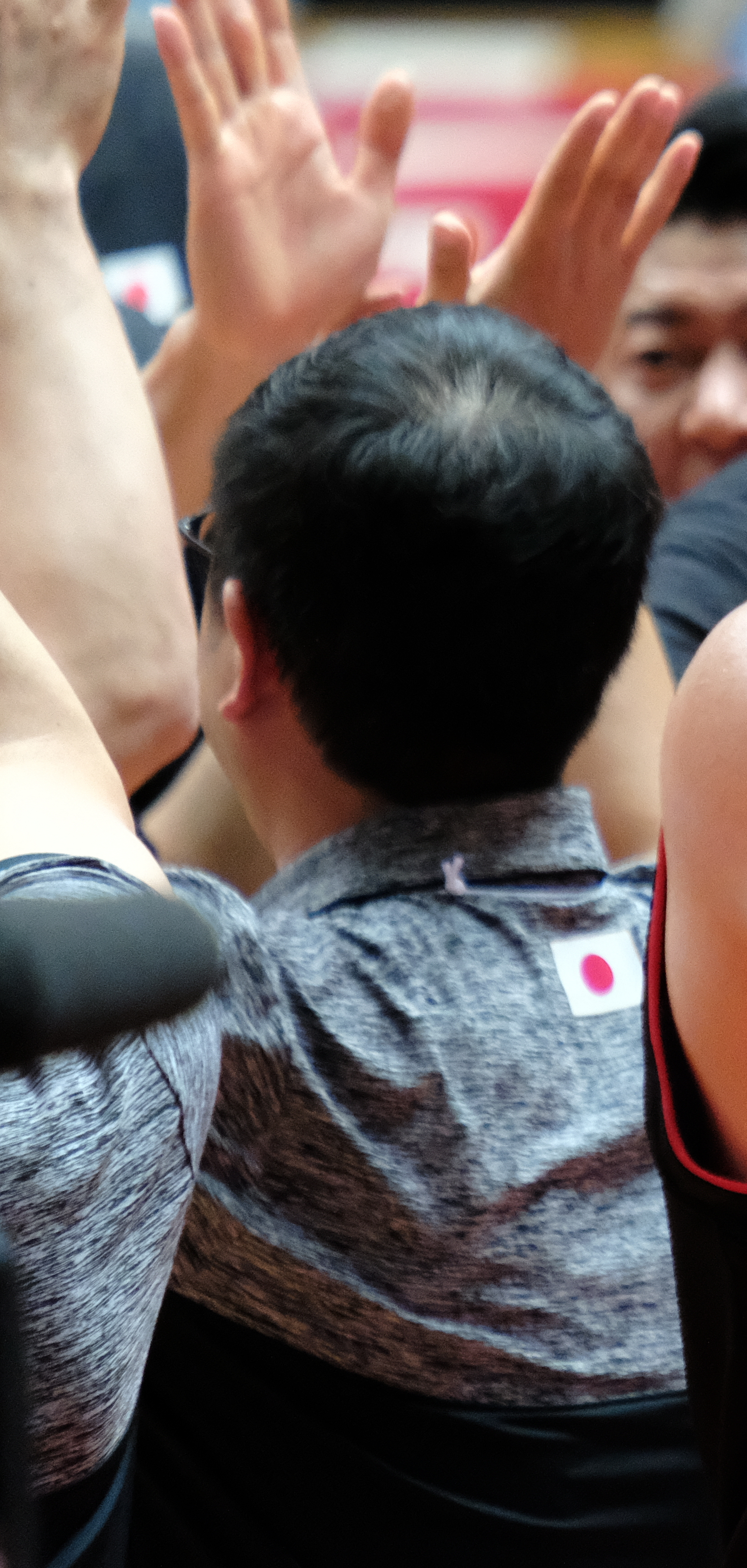
Maeda with national team

== Personal life ==
Maeda has been married to Natsumi, and they have three sons.
