= Makoto Hasegawa (basketball) =

Japanese basketball player and coach

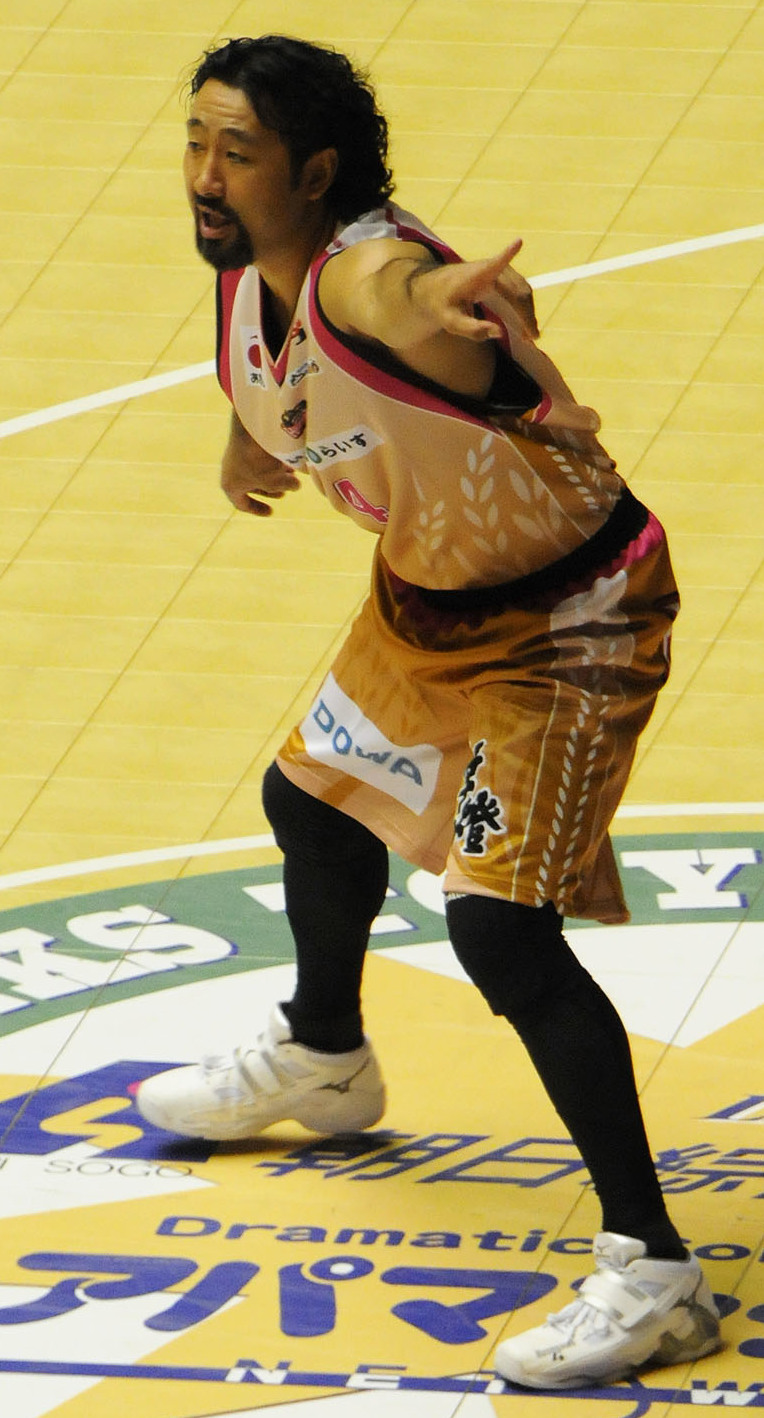
- Hasegawa (2010)

Akita Northern Happinets
- Title: Unaffiliated director
- League: B.League, FIBA 3X3

Personal information
- Born: April 2, 1971 (age 55) Omonogawa, Akita, Japan
- Listed height: 6 ft 1 in (1.85 m)
- Listed weight: 187 lb (85 kg)

Career information
- High school: Noshiro Technical (Noshiro, Akita)
- College: Nihon University
- Playing career: 1994–2013
- Position: Point guard
- Coaching career: 2014–present

Career history

Playing
- 1994–1996: Matsushita Electric
- 1996–2000: Zexel Blue Winds
- 2000–2001: San Diego Wildfire
- 2001–2002: Isuzu Motors Giga Cats
- 2002–2010: Niigata Albirex BB
- 2010–2013: Akita Northern Happinets

Coaching
- 2014–2017: Akita Northern Happinets
- 2017-2018: Japan national 3x3 team
- 2018-present: Japan national 3x3 team (associate)

Career highlights
- As player: Japan Basketball League Rookie of the Year (1994); 2x Japan Basketball League MVP (1994, 1996); 2x JBL free throw percentage leaders (1994, 1997); Japan Basketball League All-Star; JBL Assist Leader (1997); bj league All-Star (2006); 2x Japanese college champion (1992, 1993); 3x Japanese high school champion (1987–1989)
Medals
Men's basketball
Representing Japan
FIBA Asia Cup
Bronze medal – third place	1995 Seoul	Japan
Silver medal – second place	1997 Riyadh	Japan
Asian Games
Bronze medal – third place	1994 Hiroshima	Japan
Summer Universiade
Silver medal – second place	1995 Fukuoka	Japan
FIBA Asia Under-18 Championship
Gold medal – first place	1990 Nagoya	Japan
Basketball coaching
Representing Japan
FIBA 3x3 Under-23 World Cup
Silver medal – second place	2018 Xi'an	Japan 3x3
Gold medal – first place	2019 Lanzhou	Japan 3x3
FIBA 3x3 Women's Series
Silver medal – second place	2019 Chengdu	Japan 3x3
Gold medal – first place	2019 Xiong An	Japan 3x3
Bronze medal – third place	2019 Tokyo	Japan 3x3
Silver medal – second place	2019 Montreal	Japan 3x3

Makoto Hasegawa (長谷川誠, born 2 April 1971) is a Japanese basketball coach and a former player. Hasegawa was the head coach of Akita Northern Happinets. He is the first Japanese player ever to play in the American Basketball Association. Because of his trademark bushy goatee, his nickname is "hige" in Akita. He played for Kosei Club and Akita Northern Bisons as an amateur in his home prefecture. Currently he serves as an unaffiliated director of the Akita Happinets and the Japan national 3x3 team coach.

== Professional career ==
=== San Diego Wildfire ===
In 2000 Hasegawa signed with the San Diego Wildfire, but the Japanese Jordan suffered from dirty uniforms and undelivered checks. SDW never had a single telecast or radio broadcast, a team that one night drew only 236 fans to the Sports Arena. The team's trainer, equipment manager, and cheerleaders all left and the club folded in disgrace in 2001. Former NBA players, LaSalle Thompson and Dane Suttle served as head coach.

== Career statistics ==
Legend
GP	Games played	GS	Games started	MPG	Minutes per game
FG%	Field goal percentage	3P%	3-point field goal percentage	FT%	Free throw percentage
RPG	Rebounds per game	APG	Assists per game	SPG	Steals per game
BPG	Blocks per game	PPG	Points per game	**Bold**	Career high

=== Regular season ===
Year	Team	GP	GS	MPG	FG%	3P%	FT%	RPG	APG	SPG	BPG	PPG
2005-06	Niigata	26	3	14.8	.426	.364	.838	1.9	1.8	0.3	0.0	6.4
2006-07	Niigata	37	29	18.5	.476	.372	.861	1.5	2.2	0.6	0.0	7.9
2007-08	Niigata	34		11.8	.391	.273	.857	1.3	1.4	0.4	0.0	4.4
2008-09	Niigata	49	32	11.9	.451	.333	.811	1.1	1.6	0.2	0.0	4.9
2009-10	Niigata	15	9	7.6	.389	.286	.846	0.7	1.2	0.1	0.0	2.7
2010-11	Akita	33	1	10.8	.407	.352	.757	1.0	1.5	0.3	0.0	5.3
2011-12	Akita	18	2	6.8	.296	.214	1.000	0.7	0.9	0.1	0.0	1.3
2012-13	Akita	10		4.6	.353	.286	.000	0.5	0.7	0.2	0.0	1.4
Career 2005-13		222		12.1	.428	.331	.834	1.2	1.5	0.3	0.0	5.0

=== Playoff games ===
Year	Team	GP	GS	MPG	FG%	3P%	FT%	RPG	APG	SPG	BPG	PPG
2010-11	Akita	2		14.5	.375	.000	.000	3.0	4.5	0.5	0.0	3.0
2011-12	Akita	3		2.3	.000	.000	.000	1.0	0.3	0.0	0.0	0.0

=== National team ===
Year	Team	GP	GS	MPG	FG%	3P%	FT%	RPG	APG	SPG	BPG	PPG
1998	World Cup Japan	5		13.48	.269	.250	.875	1.2	0.2	0.0	0.0	4.8

== Head coaching record ==
Legend
Regular season	G	Games coached	W	Games won	L	Games lost	W–L %	Win–loss %
Playoffs	PG	Playoff games	PW	Playoff wins	PL	Playoff losses	PW–L %	Playoff win–loss %

Team	Year	G	W	L	W–L%	Finish	PG	PW	PL	PW–L%	Result
Akita	2014-15	52	41	11	.788	1st in Eastern	7	5	2	.714	Eastern Champions
Akita	2015-16	52	35	17	.673	3rd in Eastern	6	5	1	.833	3rd place
Akita	2016-17	60	18	42	.300	5th in Eastern	—	—	—	—	relegated to B2
Career		164	94	70	.573		13	10	3	.769	

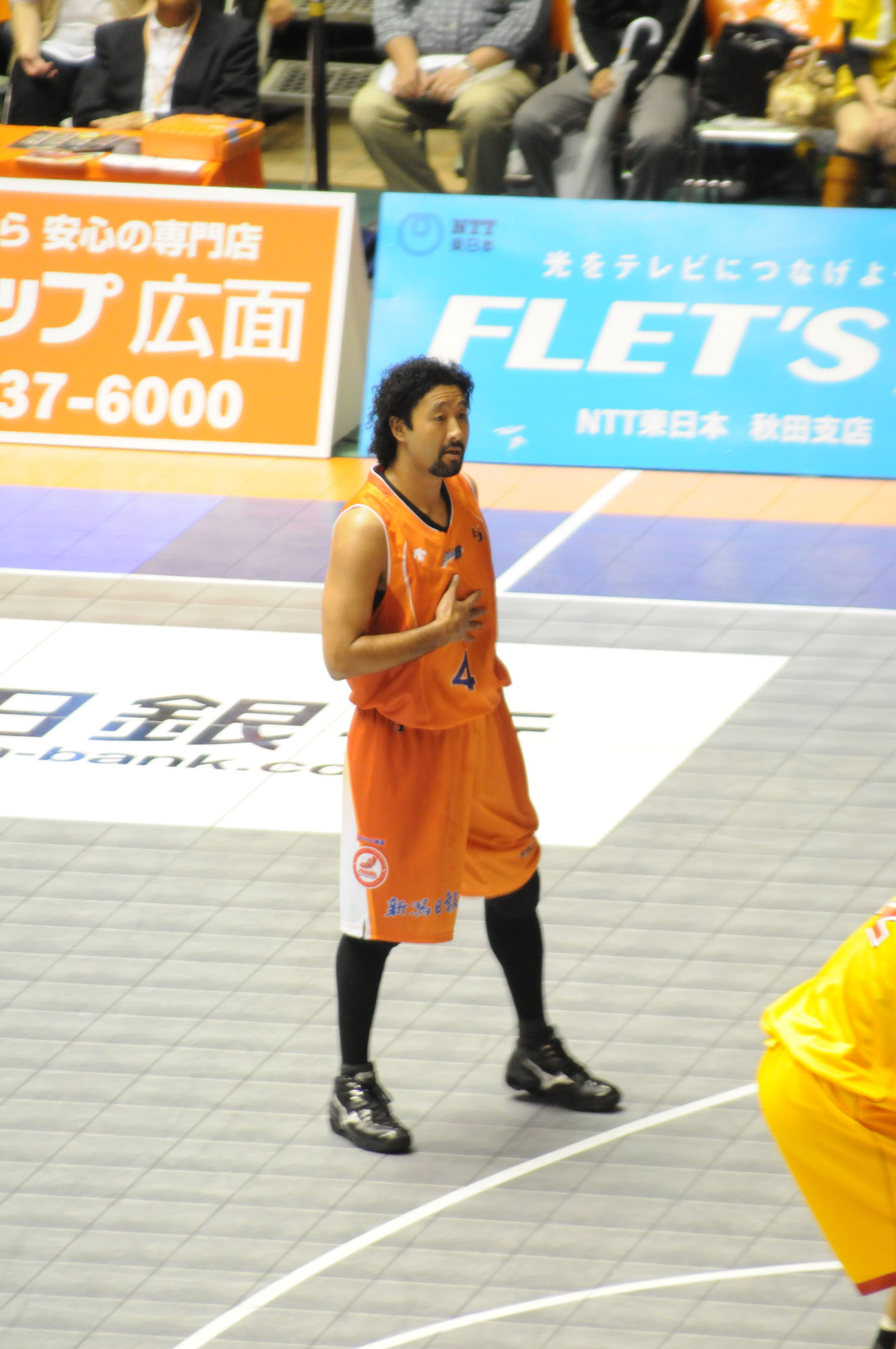
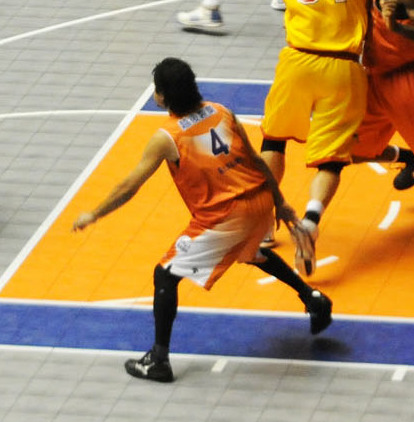
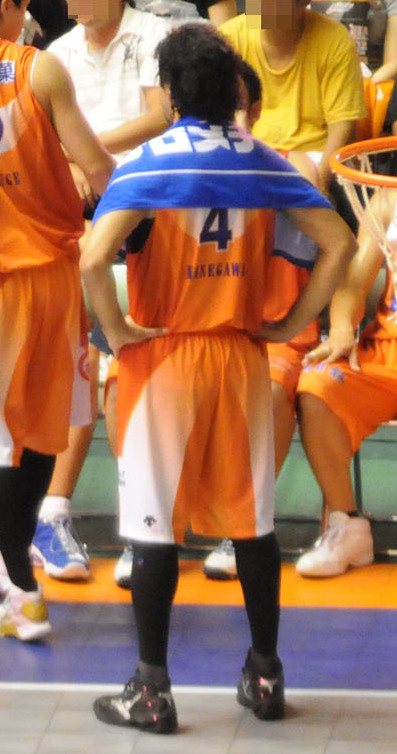
