= Toshifumi Takeshima =

Japanese television announcer

- Born: Toshifumi Takeshima; October 28, 1986 (age 38); Akita, Japan
- Education: Meiji University
- Occupation: Announcer
- Years active: 2010-
- Organization(s): Akita Northern Happinets; Blaublitz Akita
- Television: Akita Television
- Call sign: JOBI-DTV

Toshifumi Takeshima (竹島 知郁, Takeshima Toshifumi; born October 28, 1986) is a Japanese television announcer for the Akita Television in Akita and the play-by-play broadcaster for the Akita Northern Happinets of the B.League in Japan. Born in Akita, Takeshima graduated from Toin Gakuen High School in Yokohama and earned his academic degree in communications from Meiji University. He likes kendo (third-dan grade) and rakugo.
