= JR East Akita Peckers =

- Leagues: Japan Industrial and Commercial Basketball Federation
- Founded: 1947
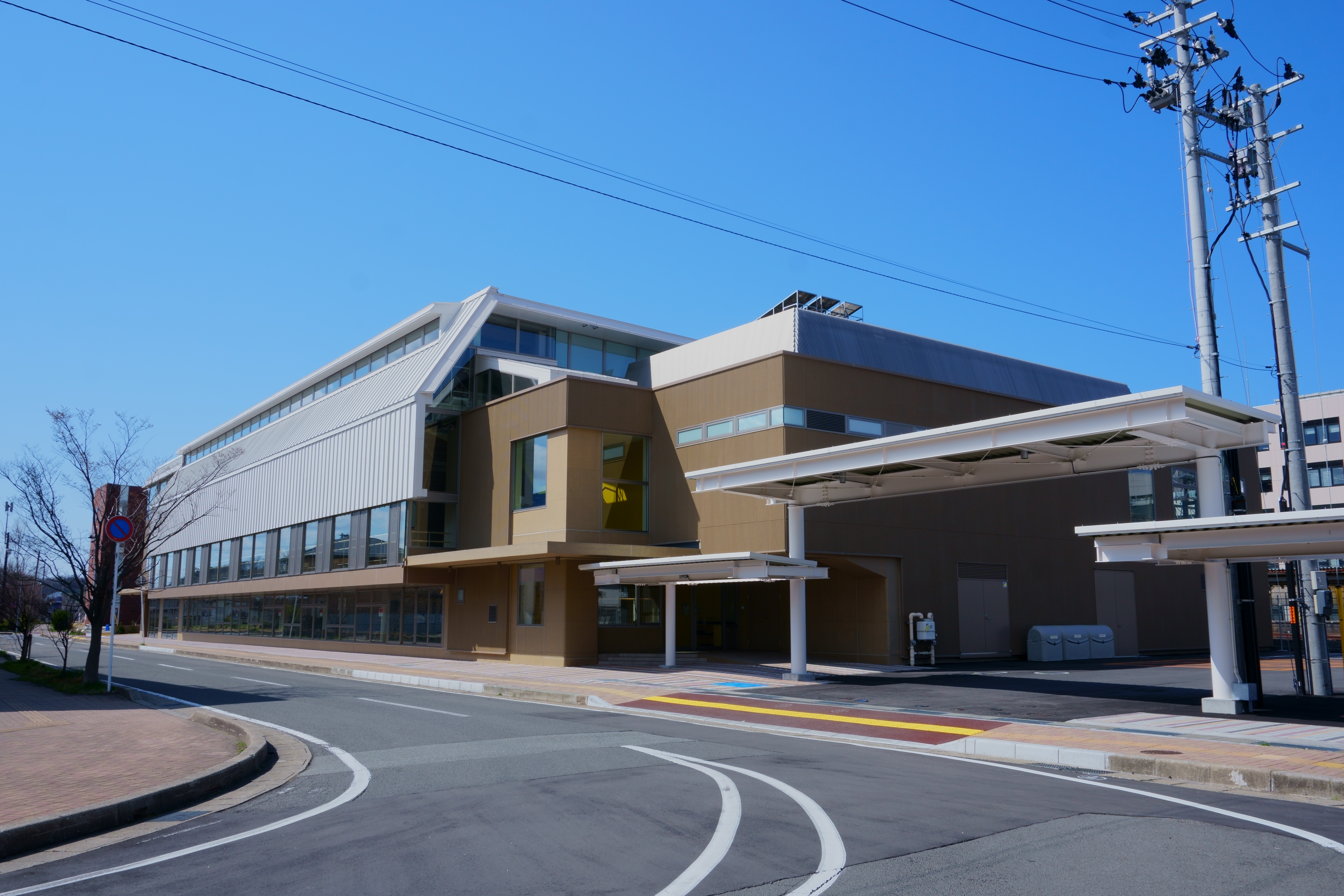
- Arena: Akita Northern Gate Square (practice)
- Location: Akita, Akita
- Head coach: Narihiro Kuromasa
- Ownership: East Japan Railway
- Website: www.jreast.co.jp/akita/branch/jrclub/basketball/index.html
| Home | Away |

The JR East Akita Peckers are a Japanese semi-professional basketball team based in Akita, Akita that competes in the Japan Industrial and Commercial Basketball Federation .

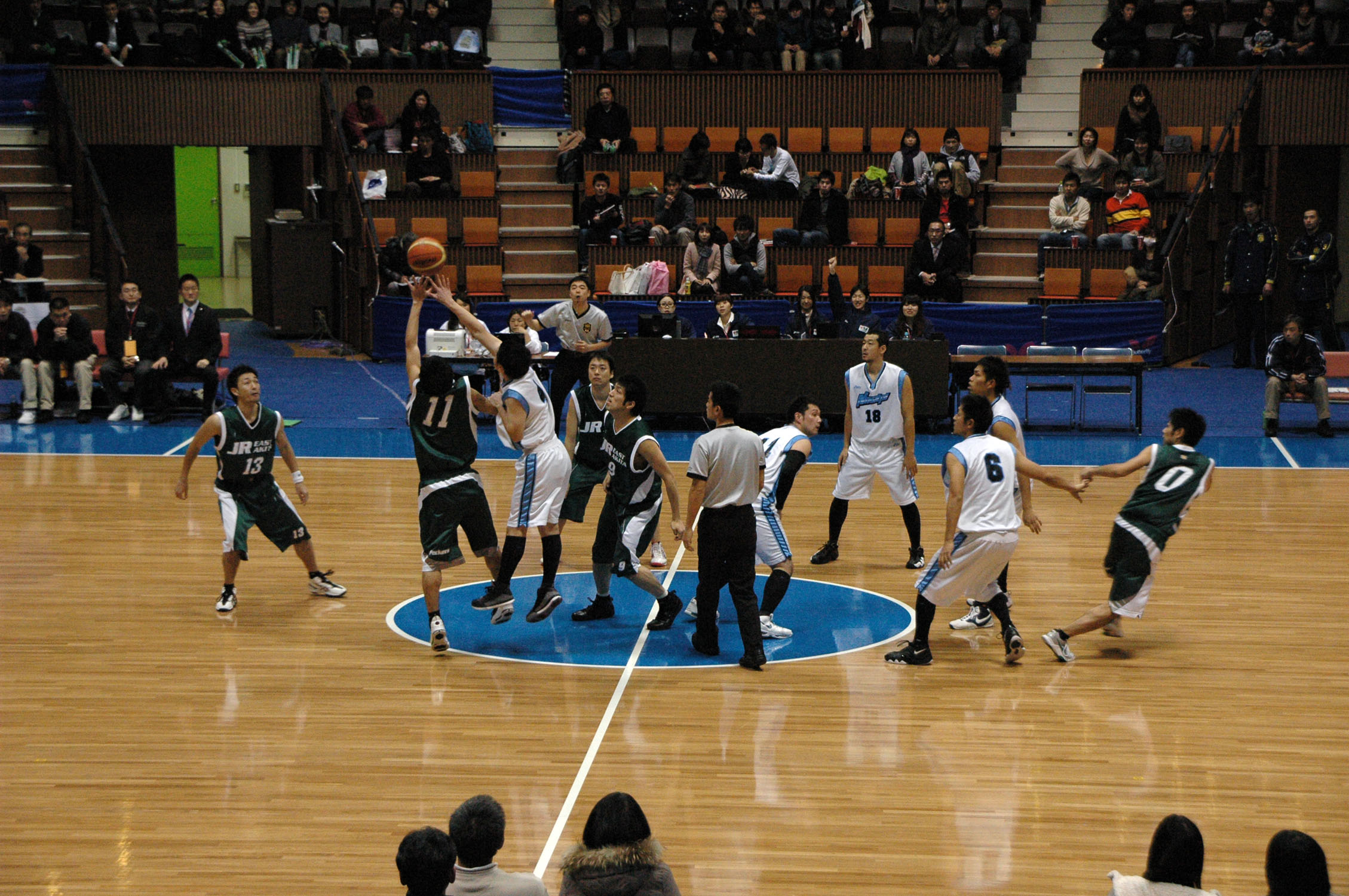
Peckers in 2011

== Honors and titles ==
Japan Industrial and Commercial Basketball Federation Championships

- Champions (2): 2004, 2005
- Runners-up (1): 2003

Japan Industrial and Commercial Basketball Federation Competitions

- Champions (3): 2003, 2004, 2017
- Runners-up (5): 2002, 2005, 2006, 2008, 2009

National Sports Festival of Japan

- Champions (3): 2017, 2018, 2019

== Notable players ==
- Kotaro Oya
- Toru Wakatsuki

== COVID-19 ==
17 Peckers players, trainer and their family members tested positive for COVID-19 in August 2020.

== Gallery ==
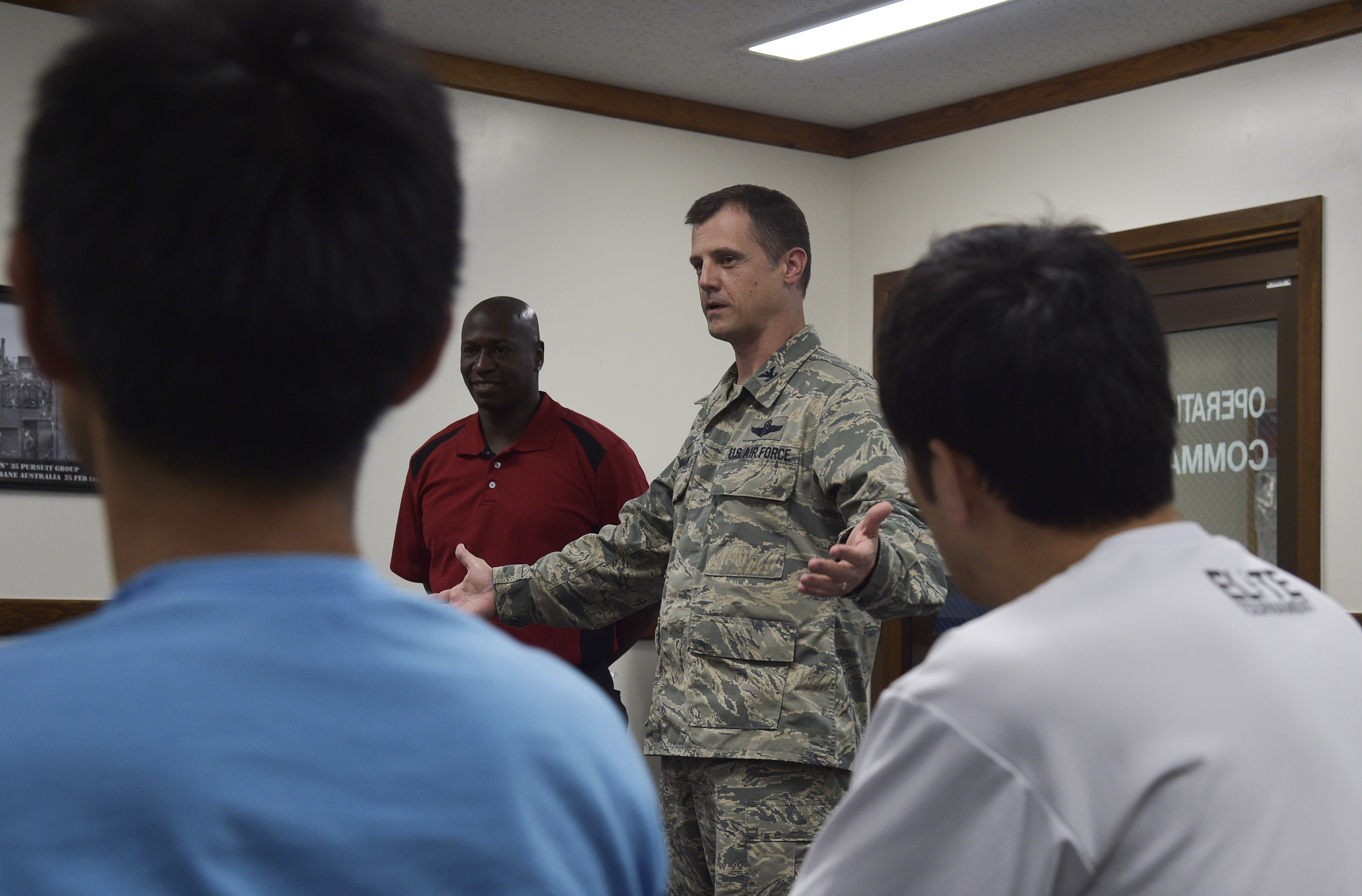
Peckers at Misawa Air Base

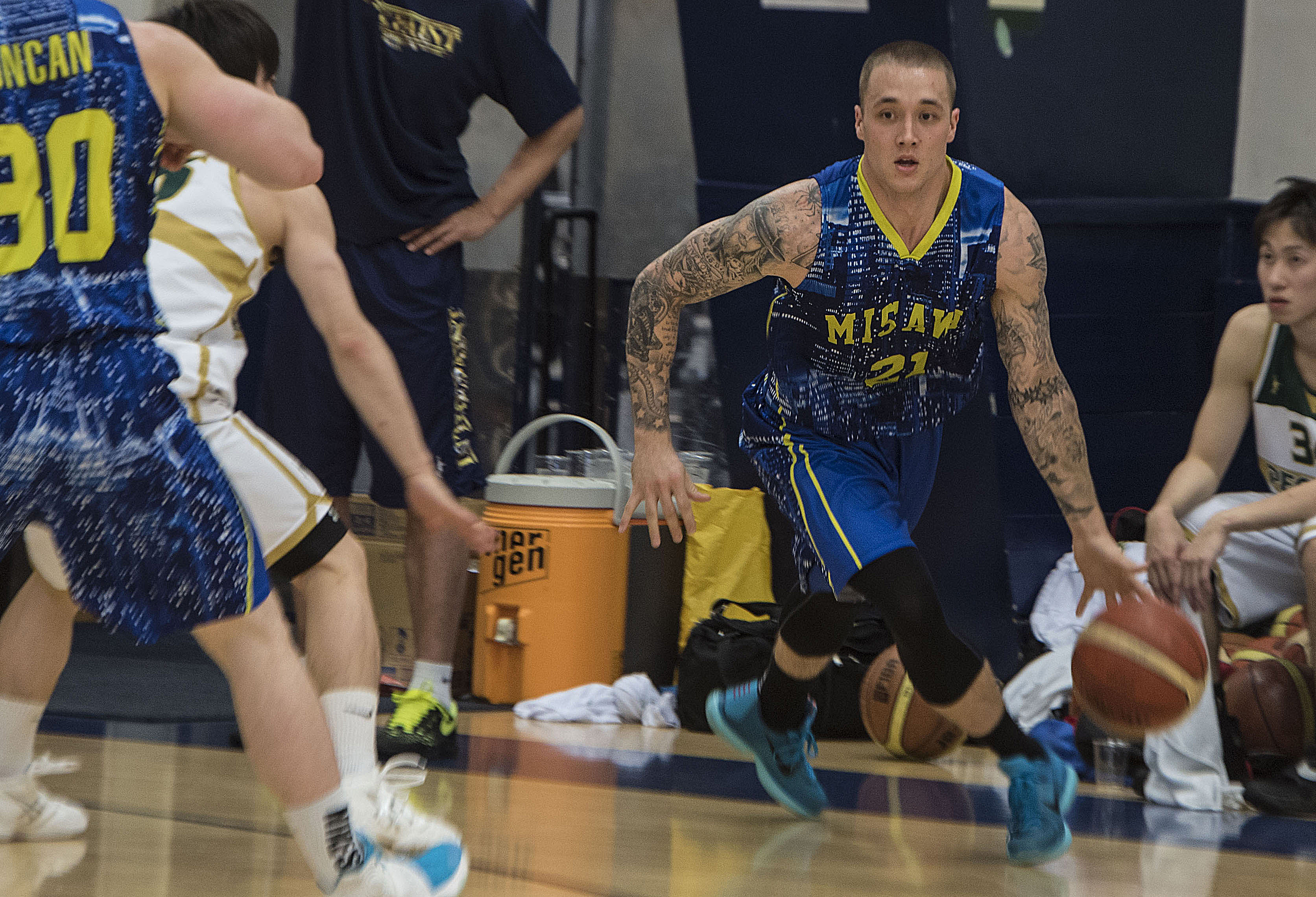
Peckers vs. Misawa Jets

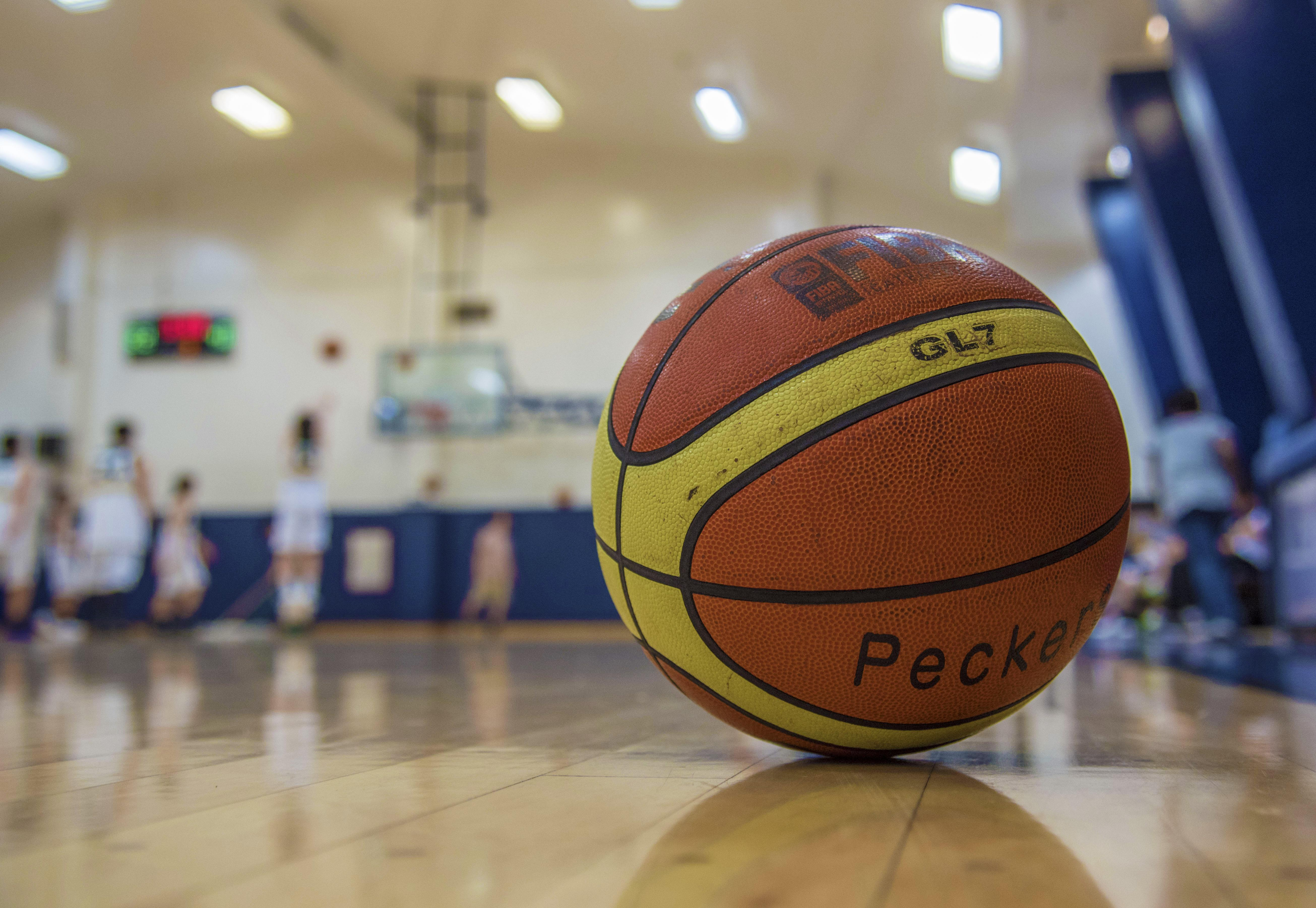
Peckers ball

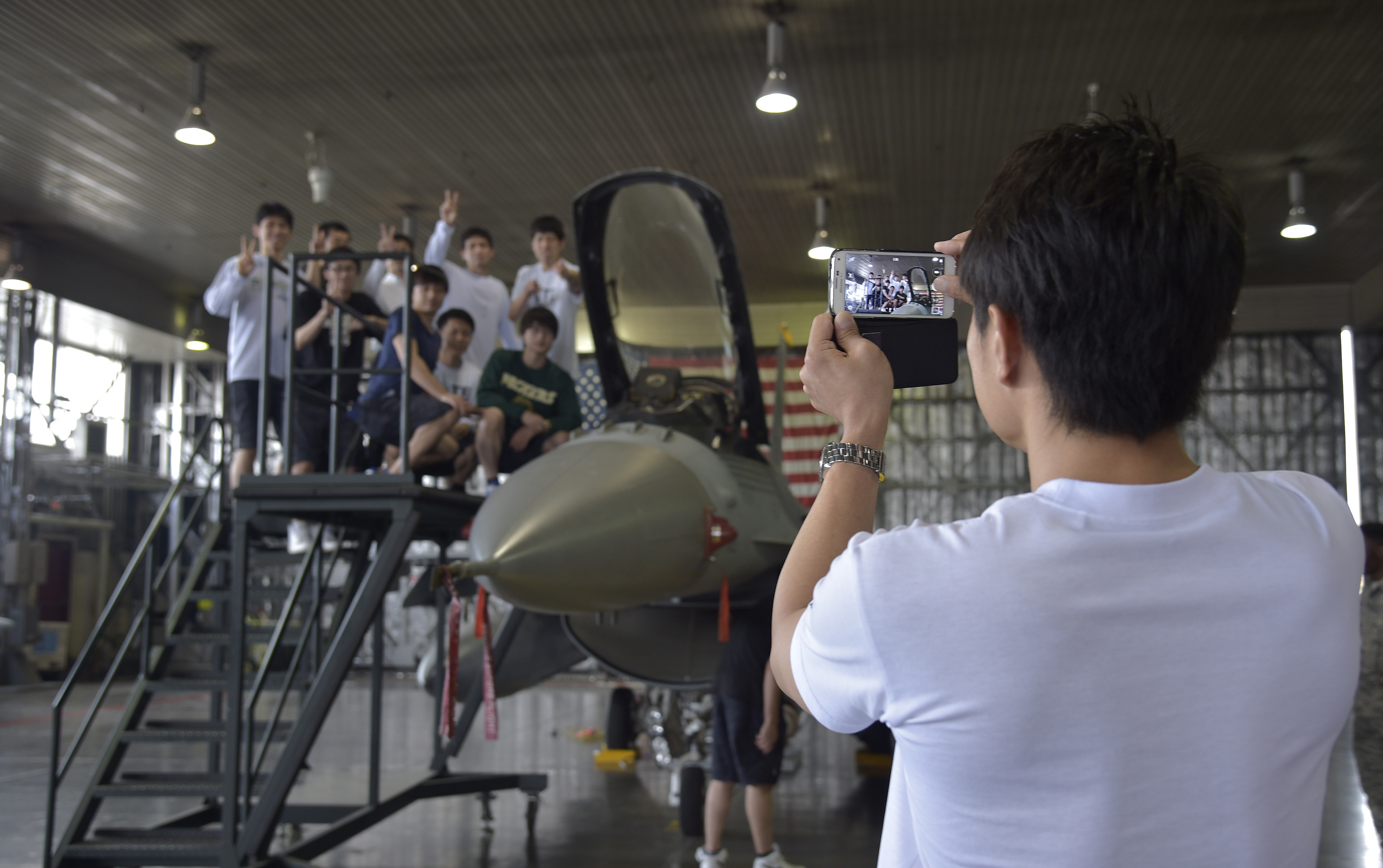
