= Seiichi Oba =

Japanese basketball player

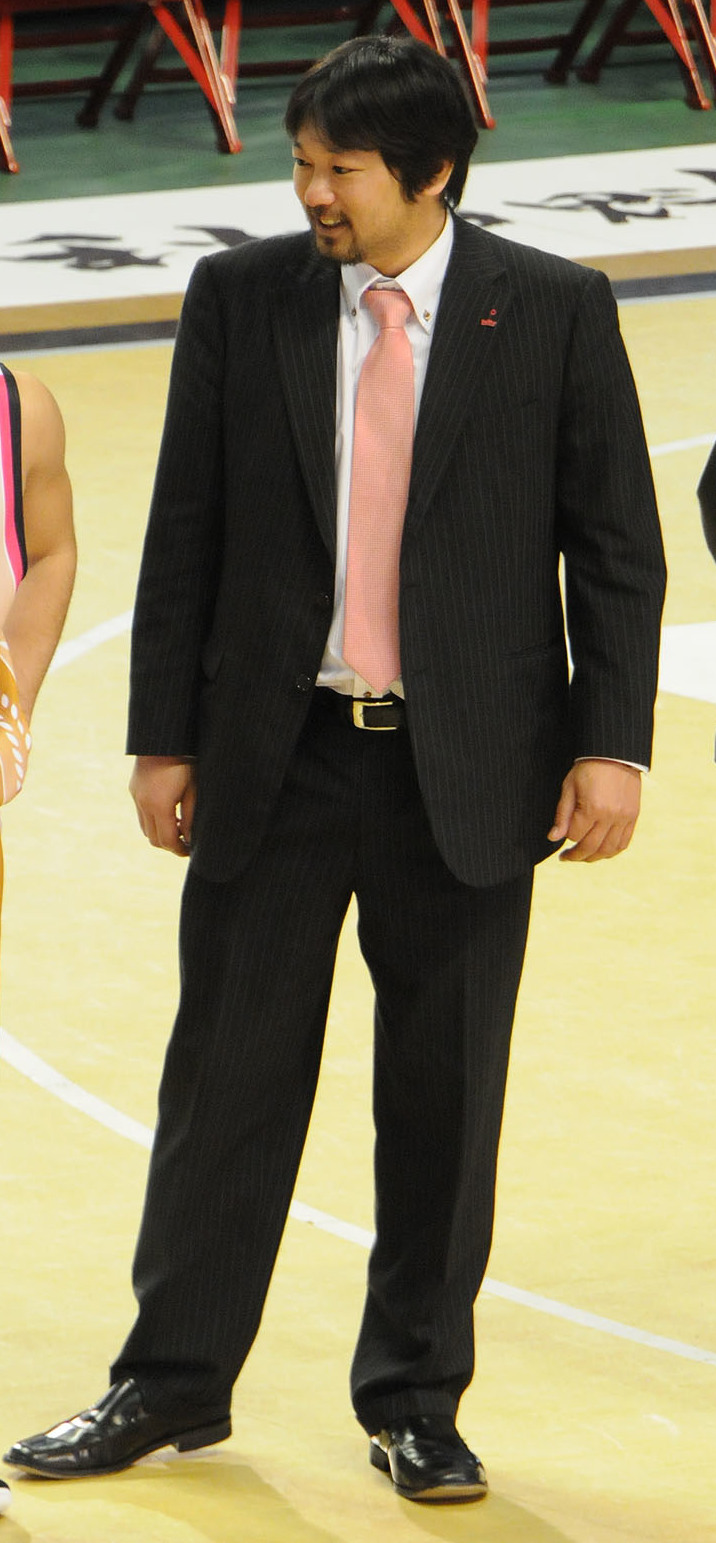
- Oba at Akita Municipal Gymnasium

Akita Northern Happinets
- Position: General manager
- League: B.League

Personal information
- Born: April 13, 1973 (age 53) Kotooka, Akita
- Listed height: 5 ft 9 in (1.75 m)

Career information
- High school: Noshiro Technical (Noshiro, Akita)
- College: Akita Keizaihoka University

Career history
- 1996–1998: Zexel Blue Winds

Career highlights
- As player: 3x Japanese high school champions

Seiichi Oba (大場 清悦, Ōba Seiichi; born April 13, 1973) is a Japanese professional basketball executive and former player, currently serving as the general manager of the Akita Northern Happinets of the Japanese B.League.
