= Yo Saito =

Japanese announcer

- 齋藤 陽
- Born: Yamagata Prefecture, Japan
- Education: Keio University
- Years active: 2025–
- Employer: TV Tokyo
- Television: Moya Moya Summers 2; News Morning Satellite
- Website: Yo Saito

Yo Saito (齋藤 陽, Saito Yo) is a Japanese announcer for TV Tokyo.

== Career ==
In March 2025, she graduated from the Keio University. She later joined TV Tokyo in April of the same year.

In July 2025, she was appointed as the 5th Assistant of Moya Moya Summers 2 in succession to Hitomi Tanaka.

In January 2026, she started hosting News Morning Satellite on Mondays.

== Appearances ==
=== Current ===
- Moya Moya Summers 2 (5th Assistant) – 19 Jul 2025 –
- News Morning Satellite
  - Mondays; 19 Jan 2026 –

=== Former ===
- TV Tokyo Music Festival – 9 Jul 2025

Preceded by Hitomi Tanaka	Moya Moya Summers 2 5th Assistant; Jul 2026 –	Succeeded by —
