= Akita Asahi Broadcasting =

Akita Asahi Broadcasting Co., Ltd.
- Logo used since 2012

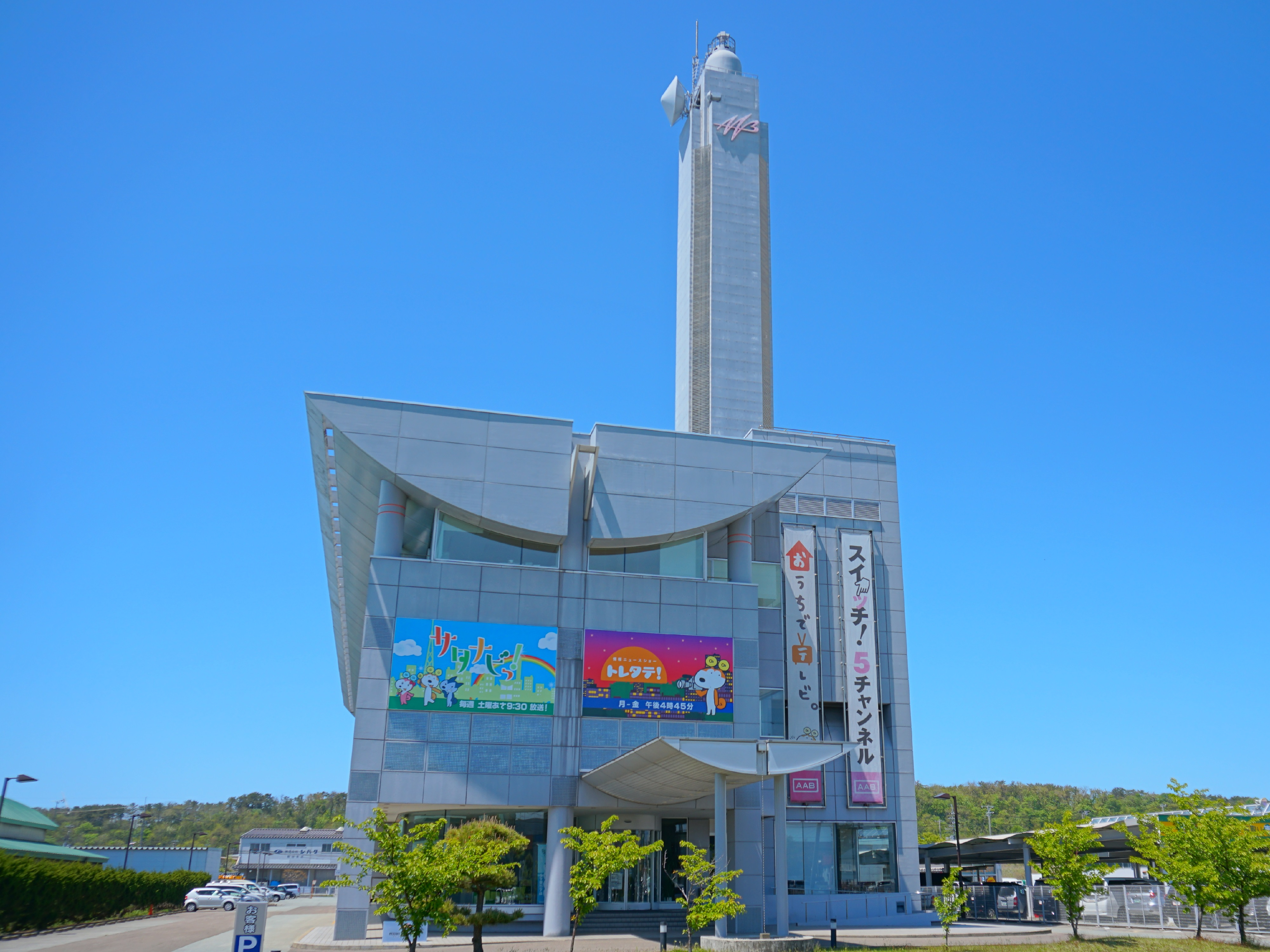
- Headquarters in Kawashirimachi, Akita
- Trade name: AAB
- Native name: 秋田朝日放送株式会社
- Romanized name: Akitaasahihōsō kabushikigaisha
- Type: Kabushiki gaisha
- Industry: Television broadcasting
- Founded: July 29, 1991
- Headquarters: 233-209 Okawabata, Kawashirimachi, Akita City, Akita Prefecture, Japan
- Website: www.aab-tv.co.jp
- Footnotes; Data from its Company Profile

JOXX-DTV
- Akita Prefecture; Japan
- City: Akita
- Channels: Digital: 29 (UHF); Virtual: 5
- Branding: Akita Asahi Broadcasting; AAB

Programming
- Language: Japanese
- Affiliations: All-Nippon News Network

Ownership
- Owner: Akita Asahi Broadcasting Co., Ltd.

History
- First air date: October 1, 1992
- Former call signs: JOXX-TV (1992–2011)
- Former channel numbers: Analog: 31 (UHF, 1992–2011)
- Call sign meaning: XX = 20th century

Technical information
- Licensing authority: MIC

Akita Asahi Broadcasting Co., Ltd. (秋田朝日放送株式会社, Akita Asahi Hōsō Kabushiki-gaisha), also known as AAB, is a Japanese terrestrial television station affiliated with the All-Nippon News Network, covering all of Akita Prefecture. Their headquarters are located in Akita, its capital with its main transmitter is located at Omoriyama Park, in the city of Akita.

== History ==
=== Background ===
In the 1960s, the Asahi Shimbun publishing company solicited the opening of new UHF stations to build a national television network. As a result, new affiliates would emerge, in an indirect manner, being shoehorned into other affiliations. Akita Prefecture did the same in 1965, and one of the candidates was affiliated to the newspaper, Akita Asahi Broadcasting (with no relation to the company established in 1991).。

However, after four companies presented their candidatures, no NET/TV Asahi affiliate was created. Instead, the license was awarded to Akita Television, an FNN/FNS affiliate. In 1981, Akita Television began airing several TV Asahi programs on a secondary basis and started clearing the morning news program ANN News Seven.

On September 22, 1985, the Ministry of Posts and Telecommunications announced a plan to increase the number of terrestrial television stations to four on a national scale. This would give an incentive to the opening of further stations in seventeen prefectures that only had two commercial stations, in order to reduce the information gap between regions. Although the Akita prefectural government and the financial community had initially shown negative interest in setting up a new station, the ministry allocated a new commercial television station for the prefecture in 1986, attracting 21 candidates.

When the allocation was announced, TV Asahi announced that it would withdraw its agreement with AKT when its affiliation contract expired by the end of March 1987. In July 1987, TBS president Kozo Hamaguchi said that the network was planning a television station in Akita, but was reluctant in doing so, even though it was a request from the telecommunications authority.

However, in September 1988, at a meeting of local candidates called by the Tohoku Telecommunications Regulation Bureau, it was stated that "as a result of a survey by the ministry, TV Asahi has tentatively emerged as a candidate", making it more likely that the station would join the TV Asahi network. After that, it was reported that there were difficulties in merging applications (the same happened with Asahi Broadcasting Aomori).

=== Founding and 1990s ===
On May 15, 1991, the new station held its first shareholders' meeting, being named Akita Asahi Broadcasting, and establishing contacts with TV Asahi to obtain its affiliation. On June 18, it obtained a preliminary license, then, on July 29, it held its general founding meeting. In November, AAB bought land to build its headquarters.

Former logo, used from 1992 to 2012

On September 25, 1992, Akita Asahi Broadcasting made its first test broadcasts, while on October 1, it started regular broadcasting, becoming the 116th commercial television station in Japan overall and the 21st ANN affiliate. At 6am that day, AAB aired its launch program, AAB Advance! (AAB發進！). The initial logo of the station was a wordmark based on the concepts of "broadcasting waves" and "the heart", and its main color was red. The station's first work outside Japan was in Hungary for the filming of an interview in 1994. At the end of fiscal 1996, AAB's accumulated deficit was of almost 2.2 billion yen, while achieving net profits for the first time in 1997. In the same year, the station aired a special program to commemorate the opening of the Akita Shinkansen line. The first AAB program to be seen nationwide on all 24 ANN stations was a documentary about the Shirakami-Sanchi World Heritage Site. In 2000, it opened ten further relay stations, completing its prefectural transmitter network.。

=== 2000s ===
On October 12, 2002, to mark its tenth anniversary, the station aired Thanks and Gratitude TV, (感謝感激テレビ), a 10 1/2 hour special (from 7am to 5:30pm), scoring great ratings. The program was made to celebrate the rice industry in Akita and was hosted by Kazuki Yanami, host of the Tohoku ANN program Terebi Ihatobu. In 2003, the station had cut the debts it accumulated since its opening and implemented stock dividends in 2005. On October 1, 2006, it activated its digital terrestrial signals. The station launched its mascot Michuu (ミーチュー) in conjunction, based on the Akita breed. In 2008 and 2009, the station's ratings hit new records, with an average share of 9,9%.

=== 2010s ===
The station's largest recorded audience was during the match between Japan and the Netherlands during TV Asahi's coverage of the 2010 FIFA World Cup, attracting 43,4% of the viewer share. In June of that year, it consistently won ratings in the 7-10pm and wider 7-11pm slots. Its analog signals were switched off on July 24, 2011. In 2012, for its 20th anniversary, it introduced a new logo and the slogan The Feeling of Being 20 (ハタチのキモチ), also airing special programs for the occasion. A 2012-2013 documentary series made by the station about Tsuguharu Foujita won a Galaxy Award. For its 25th anniversary in 2017, it introduced a new slogan, "美～Beauty～". On March 2, 2018, the station, alongside Niigata Television Network 21, became an equity-method affiliate of TV Asahi Holdings.

=== 2020s ===
On January 14, 2021, AAB was registered as a weather service provider (number 225) in accordance with Article 17 of the Weather Services Law. The Omoriyama transmitting station started working on renewable energy on June 23, 2021.

Beginning in 2022, the station started implementing the TV Notice Board (テレビ回覧板) application on its terrestrial datacasting service, providing basic information for residents of certain towns of the prefecture. The service was first implemented in Yuzawa on December 1, 2022, followed by Oga on June 1, 2023 and Misato on April 1, 2025.
