= Akita Television =

JOBI-DTV
- Logo used since 1999

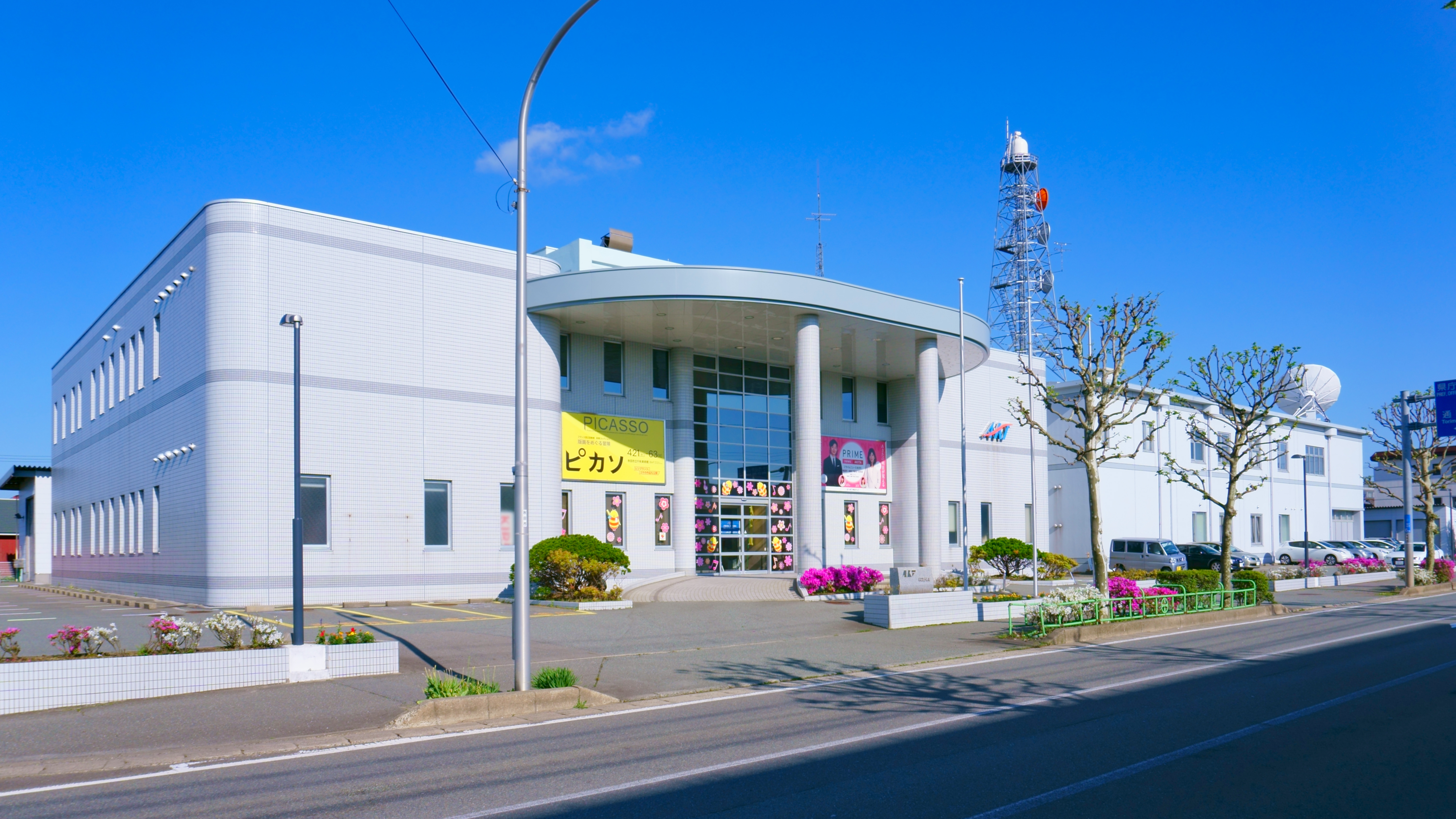
- Headquarters in Yabasehoncho, Akita
- Akita Prefecture; Japan
- City: Akita
- Channels: Digital: 21 (UHF); Virtual: 8
- Branding: Akita Television; AKT

Programming
- Language: Japanese
- Affiliations: Fuji News Network and Fuji Network System

Ownership
- Owner: Akita Television Co., Ltd.

History
- Founded: December 27, 1968
- First air date: October 1, 1969
- Former call signs: JOBI-TV (1969–2011)
- Former channel numbers: Analog: 37 (UHF, 1969–2011)
- Former affiliations: ANN (secondary, April 1, 1981–March 31, 1987)
- Call sign meaning: templated, callsigns ending in I were given to UHF television stations

Technical information
- Licensing authority: MIC

Links
- Website: https://www.akt.co.jp/

Akita Television Co., Ltd. (秋田テレビ株式会社, Akita Television Kabushikigaisha; AKT) is a TV station affiliated with Fuji News Network (FNN) and Fuji Network System (FNS) in Akita, Akita, Japan.

== History ==
The previous logo of AKT, used from 1969 until 31 March 1999

In 1967, the Ministry of Posts and Telecommunications (currently the Ministry of Internal Affairs and Communications) announced that it would open UHF bands for television use, and in October of the same year, it was decided that 18 UHF stations would be allowed to open, but there was no quota for the Tohoku region. The Ministry of Posts requested the then Governor of Akita Prefecture Isajiro Obata to consolidate the license applications. In the end, all parties agreed to apply for Akita UHF TV (秋田UHFテレビ), with each applicant's contribution to the capital of the new company limited to 10%.

On October 5, 1968, Akita UHF TV held its first founders' meeting and was granted a license on November 1. On December 26 of the same year, Akita UHF TV held its general meeting and decided to call the company "AKT" and use "Akita TV" as a common name. On May 30, 1969, Akita UHF TV changed its company name to Akita Television. On September 10 of the same year, Akita TV started test broadcasts.

At 7:45am on October 1, 1969, Akita TV started broadcasting becoming the first UHF TV station in Tohoku region, and initially joined FNN on its first broadcast. On April 1, 1981, Akita TV joined ANN and became a dual affiliated station (FNN being their primary affiliate and ANN their secondary affiliate). Akita TV withdrew from ANN in 1987, which led to the opening of Akita Asahi Broadcasting in 1992.

Digital broadcasting started on October 1, 2006; analog broadcasts ended on July 24, 2011.

== Technical information ==
Transmitters of JOBI-DTV
Location	Channel
Omoriyama	21
Hanawa	29
Honjo	47
Noshiro	46
Odate	18
Omagari	26
Takanosu	39
Yuzawa	20
