= Kimitoshi =

- Gender: Male

Origin
- Origin: Japanese
- Meaning: Different meanings depending on the kanji used

Kimitoshi (written: 公俊 or 公利) is a masculine Japanese given name. Notable people with the name include:

- Kimitoshi Nōgawa (直川 公俊; born 1984), Japanese footballer
- Kimitoshi Sano (佐野 公俊; born 1982), Japanese basketball coach
- Kimitoshi Yamane (山根 公利; born 1966), Japanese mechanical designer
