= Kibwe Trim =

Trinidad and Tobago businessman and former professional basketball player

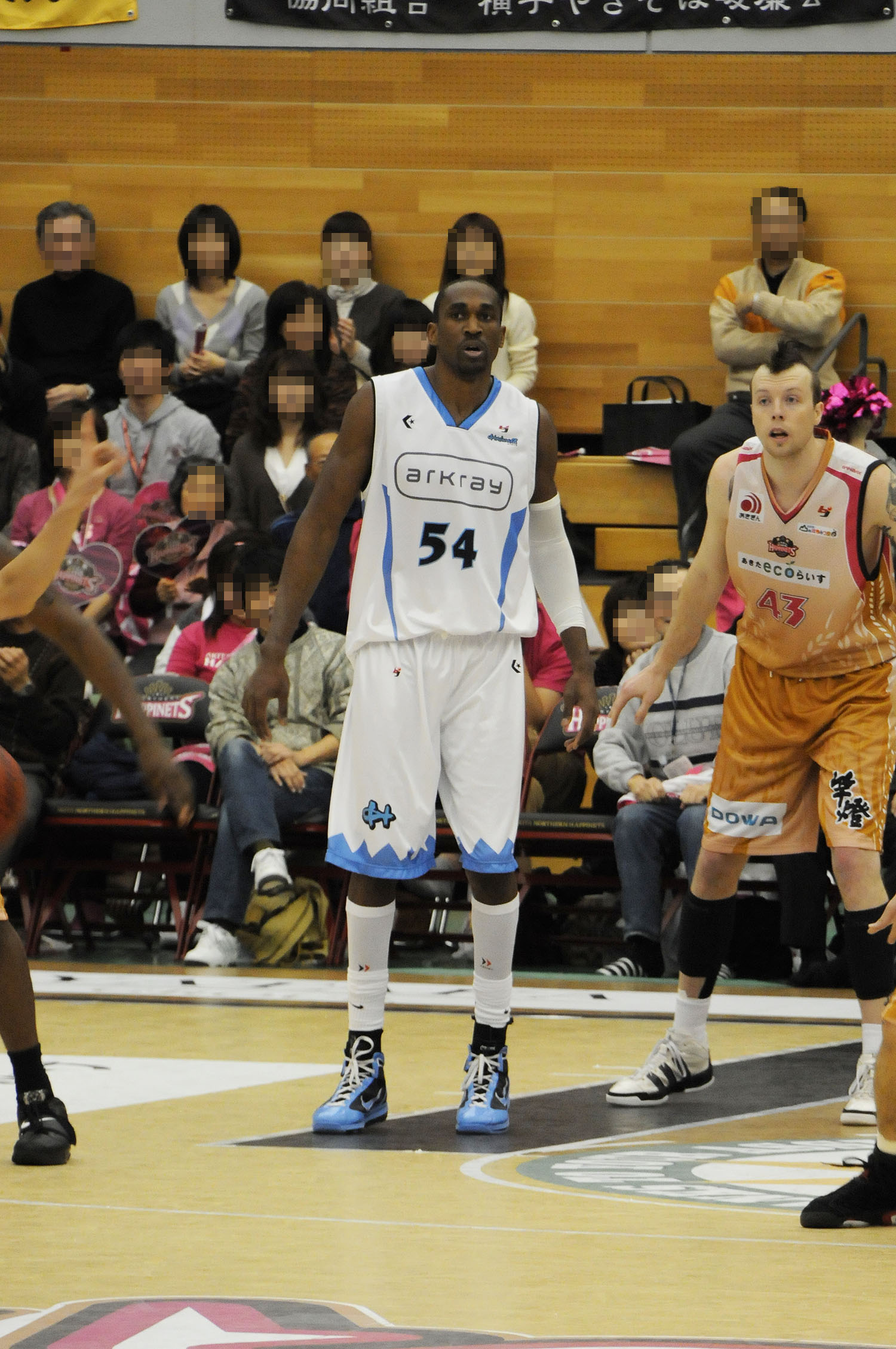

No. 54 – Retired
- Position: Power forward / center

Personal information
- Born: 16 May 1984 (age 42) San Juan, Trinidad and Tobago
- Listed height: 2.08 m (6 ft 10 in)

Career information
- College: Sacred Heart (2001-2006)
- Playing career: 2006–2015

Career history
- 2007: Gatos de Monagas
- 2007–2008: Dakota Wizards
- 2009–2010: CS Energia
- 2010–2011: Kyoto Hannaryz
- 2012: Taiwan Beer
- 2013–2015: Ryukyu Golden Kings

Career highlights
- B.League - 2014 Champion

Kibwe Kambui Khary Trim is a businessman and former professional basketball player from Trinidad and Tobago.

== Early life ==
Trim's mother was a teacher and his father was an engineer. He was a very good student.

Originally a soccer player, Kibwe Trim changed to basketball at the age of 13 when he was already 6'4 ft. (193 cm) tall.

Trim played at three different age levels in secondary school. He played with two separate club teams. He later said, "I played at every local gym whenever I had the opportunity. I was focused because I knew that this game could effectively change my life."

== College career ==
Trim went on to attend Sacred Heart University in Connecticut, USA. He graduated with a bachelor's degree in computer science, after which he did a master's degree in information technology. He was the prime player on the Sacred Heart Pioneers men's basketball team, but during his first year he suffered a serious back injury which made him sit out many games.

== Professional basketball career ==
Trim played professionally for ten years.With his last team, the Ryukyu Golden Kings, he won the Japanese Championship.

== National team ==
He played for Trinidad and Tobago's national team.

At the 2010 Centrobasket in Santo Domingo, Trinidad and Tobago was the only team that defeated the eventual champion, Puerto Rico. Trim contributed 18 points and 9 rebounds to the victory.

== Life outside of sports ==
Off the court, in 2013 he formed a non-profit foundation called DreamChaser International to provide tutoring, mentoring and other aid for children in underserved communities around the world. He aloso launched a company called LA Lime which curates social in-person networking experiences.

After retirement from sport, he became a motivational speaker and real estate investor. He published the book From Nerd to Pro.

He has taken part in many commercials and acted in the Russian basketball movie Three Seconds.

In 2019, he married Joslyn Pennywell, a former contestant in America's Next Top Model season 11.
