= Trinidad and Tobago men's national basketball team =

Trinidad and Tobago
- FIBA ranking: NR (3 March 2026)
- Joined FIBA: 1958
- FIBA zone: FIBA Americas
- National federation: National Basketball Federation of Trinidad and Tobago (NBFTT)

Olympic Games
- Appearances: None

FIBA World Cup
- Appearances: None

FIBA AmeriCup
- Appearances: None

Caribbean Championship
- Appearances: 10
- Medals: Gold: 1986, 1987, 1988, 1990; Silver: 1981, 1982, 1996
Home	Away

The Trinidad and Tobago national basketball team represents Trinidad and Tobago in international basketball competitions. It is administered by the National Basketball Federation of Trinidad and Tobago. (NBFTT)

The team won four straight gold medals from 1986–1990 in the FIBA CBC Championship. Overall, Trinidad and Tobago has six total medals in this tournament and is second in the medal list only one behind the Bahamas which has seven.

Trinidad and Tobago's last official squad was for the 2010 Centrobasket in Santo Domingo. There, Trinidad and Tobago was the only team that defeated the eventual champion Puerto Rico.

== History ==
In the 2009 CBC Trinidad finished in fourth place with a 3–0 record led by Ian Young who averaged 18.6 PPG and Wilferd Benjamin who averaged 12.4 PPG and led their team with a total of 45 rebounds. A close second was Julius Ashby who had 41 rebounds.

== Competitions ==
=== Summer Olympics ===
yet to qualify

=== FIBA World Cup ===
yet to qualify

=== FIBA AmeriCup ===
yet to qualify

=== Centrobasket ===
- 1971 : 6th
- 1987 : 6th
- 1989 : 9th
- 2010 : 10th

=== Caribbean Championship ===
- 1981 : (silver)
- 1982 : (silver)
- 1984 : ?
- 1985 : ?
- 1986 : (gold)
- 1987 : (gold)
- 1988 : (gold)
- 1990 : (gold)
- 1991 : ?
- 1993 : ?
- 1994 : ?
- 1995 : ?
- 1996 : (silver)
- 1998 : –
- 2000 : 7th
- 2002 : –
- 2004 : –
- 2006 : –
- 2007 : 9th
- 2009 : 4th
- 2011 : –
- 2014 : –
- 2015 : –

=== Commonwealth Games ===
never participated

== Current roster ==
At the 2010 Centrobasket: (last publicized squad)

Trinidad and Tobago men's national basketball team roster
Players
Coaches

Pos.	No.	Name	Age – Date of birth	Height	Club	Ctr.
G	4	Ian Curtis Young	28 – 27 September 1981	1.91 m (6 ft 3 in)	Gaiteros de Zulia	(Venezuela)
G	5	Maurice Michael Joseph	24 – 26 September 1985	1.93 m (6 ft 4 in)	Vermont Catamounts men's basketball	(United States)
F	6	Steven Arthur Lewis	30 – 10 January 1980	1.93 m (6 ft 4 in)	Defence Force Basketball	(Trinidad and Tobago)
G/F	7	Wendell John Carter	37 – 9 June 1973	2.04 m (6 ft 8 in)
G/F	8	Sheldon Kurt Christian	27 – 17 January 1983		Shak Attack	(Trinidad and Tobago)
PG	9	Joel Haywood	25 – 3 September 1984	1.86 m (6 ft 1 in)	Saint Mary's Huskies	(Canada)
F	10	Devaughn Keldon Lamont	26 – 18 June 1984	2.08 m (6 ft 10 in)	Panteras de Miranda	(Venezuela)
C	11	Miguel Michael Williams	32 – 30 January 1978	2.06 m (6 ft 9 in)	Petro Jazz Basketball	(Trinidad and Tobago)
F/C	12	Kibwe Trim	26 – 16 May 1984	2.08 m (6 ft 10 in)	Gatos de Monagas	(Venezuela)
F/C	13	Julius Ashby	27 – 14 September 1982	2.05 m (6 ft 9 in)	Tokyo Apache	(Japan)
F/C	14	Wilfred Benjamin	25 – 30 October 1984	2.01 m (6 ft 7 in)	San Martín de Marcos Juárez	(Argentina)

Head coach

- (United States) Terry Layton

Legend

- Club – describes last
  club before the tournament
- Age – describes age
  on 30 June 2009

=== Depth chart ===
Pos.	Starting 5	Bench 1	Bench 2
C	Kibwe Trim	Julius Ashby	Miguel Michael Williams
PF	Wilfred Benjamin	Devaughn Keldon Lamont
SF	Steven Arthur Lewis	Wendell John Carter
SG	Ian Curtis Young	Sheldon Kurt Christian
PG	Joel Haywood	Maurice Michael Joseph

== Notable players ==
Other current notable players from Trinidad and Tobago:

Trinidad and Tobago men's national basketball team roster
Players	Coaches
Pos. / No. / Name / Age – Date of birth / Height / Club; G / 3 / Khadeen Carrington / 29 – 3 October 1995 / 1.93 m (6 ft 4 in) / Hapoel Jerusalem B.C. / (Israel)	Legend: Club – describes current club; Age – describes age on 22 December 2024

== Kit ==
=== Manufacturer ===
2010: Adidas

== See also ==
- Trinidad and Tobago women's national basketball team
- Trinidad and Tobago national under-19 basketball team
- Trinidad and Tobago national under-17 basketball team
- Trinidad and Tobago national 3x3 team
