= Joey Haywood =

Trinidad and Tobago basketball player

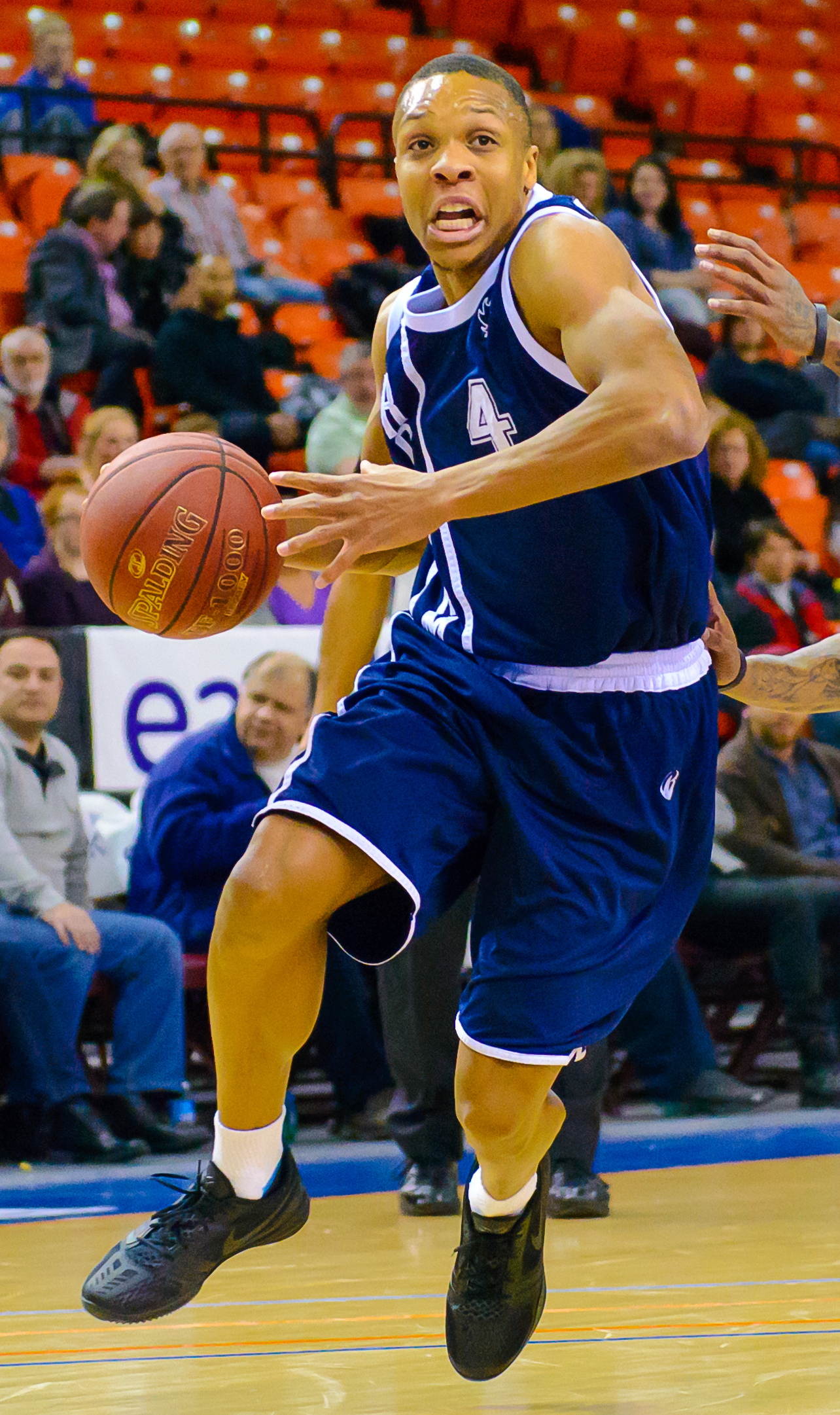
- Haywood drives to the basket in 2015

Personal information
- Born: 3 September 1984 (age 42) Vancouver, British Columbia, Canada
- Listed height: 1.85 m (6 ft 1 in)
- Listed weight: 77 kg (170 lb)

Career information
- High school: Magee (Vancouver, British Columbia)
- College: Langara (2007–2008); Saint Mary's (2008–2011)
- Playing career: 2011–2020
- Position: Point guard

Career history
- 2011–2013: Halifax Rainmen
- 2013–2014: Aalborg Vikings
- 2014: Grindavík
- 2014–2015: Halifax Rainmen
- 2016–2018: Halifax Hurricanes
- 2020: Fraser Valley Bandits

Career highlights
- 2× NBL Canada All-Canada Team (2013, 2015); All-Basketligaen Honorable Mention (2014); Basketligaen All-Star (2014); Basketligaen scoring champion (2014); 2× NBL Canada All-Star (2012, 2013); 2× NBL Canada Canadian of the Year (2012, 2013); Second-team All-NBL Canada (2013); NBL Canada All-Defence Second Team (2012); AUS Player of the Year (2011); 2× First-team All-AUS (2009, 2010)

Joel "Joey" Haywood (born 3 September 1984) is a Canadian-born Trinidad and Tobago former professional basketball player who was a member of the Trinidad and Tobago national team. Due to his reputation as a streetball player and his ball-handling expertise, he is often nicknamed "The King Handles".

== Early life ==
Haywood was born on 3 September 1984 in Vancouver, British Columbia. His family—which included his father Zephryn and older brother Gary—moved from Trinidad and Tobago to the city of Burnaby in British Columbia in Canada. Gary, who regularly played basketball, would often take his younger sibling with him when he played. At age 7, Joey chose to stick with the sport instead of playing soccer, his father's favorite sport. He said, "In soccer, there's too many people on the field, and you don't get your time to shine."

In the area Haywood was brought up, he practiced playing in the same park that future Simon Fraser University star Jordan Mason would practice in. Haywood's ball-handling skills helped him get noticed by former Harlem Globetrotters member Mel Davis, with whom he would begin taking lessons. He eventually joined the Kits Youth Basketball League, a competition for young players from ages 13 to 16. His performance there helped him get chosen to play a role in the film Air Bud.

== High school career ==
Haywood attended Magee Secondary School in his hometown of Vancouver, following his friends there. Instantly, he became a star on the school's basketball team and was considered the top player in every grade. At around this time, Haywood tried out for the British Columbia provincial under-16 team and was one of the top 20 players on its roster. However, his style of play made him a less appealing player. In his senior year, Magee failed to make the provincials round, but Haywood managed to score 38 points in a loss to Kitsilano Secondary School, the reigning AAA Provincial Champions, in what is sometimes considered one of his best performances at the high school level.

In high school, Haywood along with his friends would star in the Notic tapes which were an underground production company based in Vancouver. Together they were known as the Notic and this eventually led to them being part of the motion capture for EA Sport's NBA Street, released in 2001.

== College career ==
Following graduation from high school, Haywood was approached by local college basketball programs such as those in Capilano and Langara College, and decided to join the latter school. Upon joining Langara Falcons basketball team, however, he mainly played as the substitute guard and saw limited minutes on the court. He left the Falcons after only one 4-month term.

Haywood transferred to Saint Mary's to play with the Huskies in 2008.

== Professional career ==
Standing 6 ft 1 in (1.85 m) and weighing 170 lbs (77 kg), he generally plays the point guard position. Haywood has appeared in multiple NBL Canada Finals throughout his playing career, and is a two-time All-Star in the league. He has been named to the NBL All-Defence team, All-Canada team, and won the Canadian of the Year Award in both 2012 and 2013. Haywood has experience playing overseas, primarily in the Basketligaen in Denmark, where he finished the 2014 season as its leading scorer, an All-Star, and a strong candidate for Most Valuable Player. Joey was drafted by Kevin Durant to play in Nike's 2014 Summer is Serious tournament.

In October 2014, Haywood signed with Úrvalsdeild karla club Grindavík. He was released by the club in end of October after four games after the clubs needs shifted to a bigger player after losing starting center Sigurður Þorsteinsson to the Solna Vikings. In the four games, Haywood averaged 17.5 points and 5.8 assists.

In April 2020, Haywood signed with the Fraser Valley Bandits of the Canadian Elite Basketball League (CEBL).

In the summer of 2019, Haywood created a basketball program known as "The School of Handles Basketball Academy" where he trains youth. The program is in partnership with Puma.

== International career ==
Haywood played for the Trinidad and Tobago national basketball team at the 2010 Centrobasket. He recorded personal bests of 13 points and 7 rebounds against Cuba. He finished the competition averaging 7.5 points and 3.5 rebounds per game.

Haywood was part of the 3D Global Sports Canada team that won the 2017 William Jones Cup.

== Acting career ==
Haywood participated in the Kits Youth Basketball League in Kitsilano, Vancouver, British Columbia, Canada in his early teenage years. With help from former Harlem Globetrotters member Mel Davis, he managed to land a role in the 1997 family comedy film Air Bud, in which he played on main character Josh Framm's team, the Timberwolves. Framm was played by actor Kevin Zegers. In 2006, Haywood appeared in the direct-to-video film Like Mike 2: Streetball, playing a streetball player named Cavity. He would be teased by his teammates with the Halifax Rainmen due to his line, "I'm Cavity. Because I'm so sweet, baby." Later in the year, he acted as a gang member for an action film directed by Jean-Claude Van Damme, The Hard Corps. He originally appeared in one scene, but it was cut from the movie. However, his name remained in the closing credits.

Haywood traveled out of Vancouver in 2011 to act in The Saints of Mt. Christopher, in which he played Delroy Links, a sophomore college basketball star that dies during a pivotal game. Rainmen owner Andre Levingston commented on Haywood's acting career, "I think it's fantastic that he's had the opportunity to play in a movie." Joey has previously considered pursuing a career in acting after retiring from basketball.

=== Films ===
Year	Production	Character	Director
2011	The Saints of Mt. Christopher	Delroy Links	Shane Dean
2006	The Hard Corps	Gang member	Jean-Claude Van Damme
2006	Like Mike 2: Streetball	Cavity	David Nelson
1997	Air Bud	Timberwolves player	Charles Martin Smith
