= Ian Young (basketball) =

American-Trinidadian basketball player (born 1981)

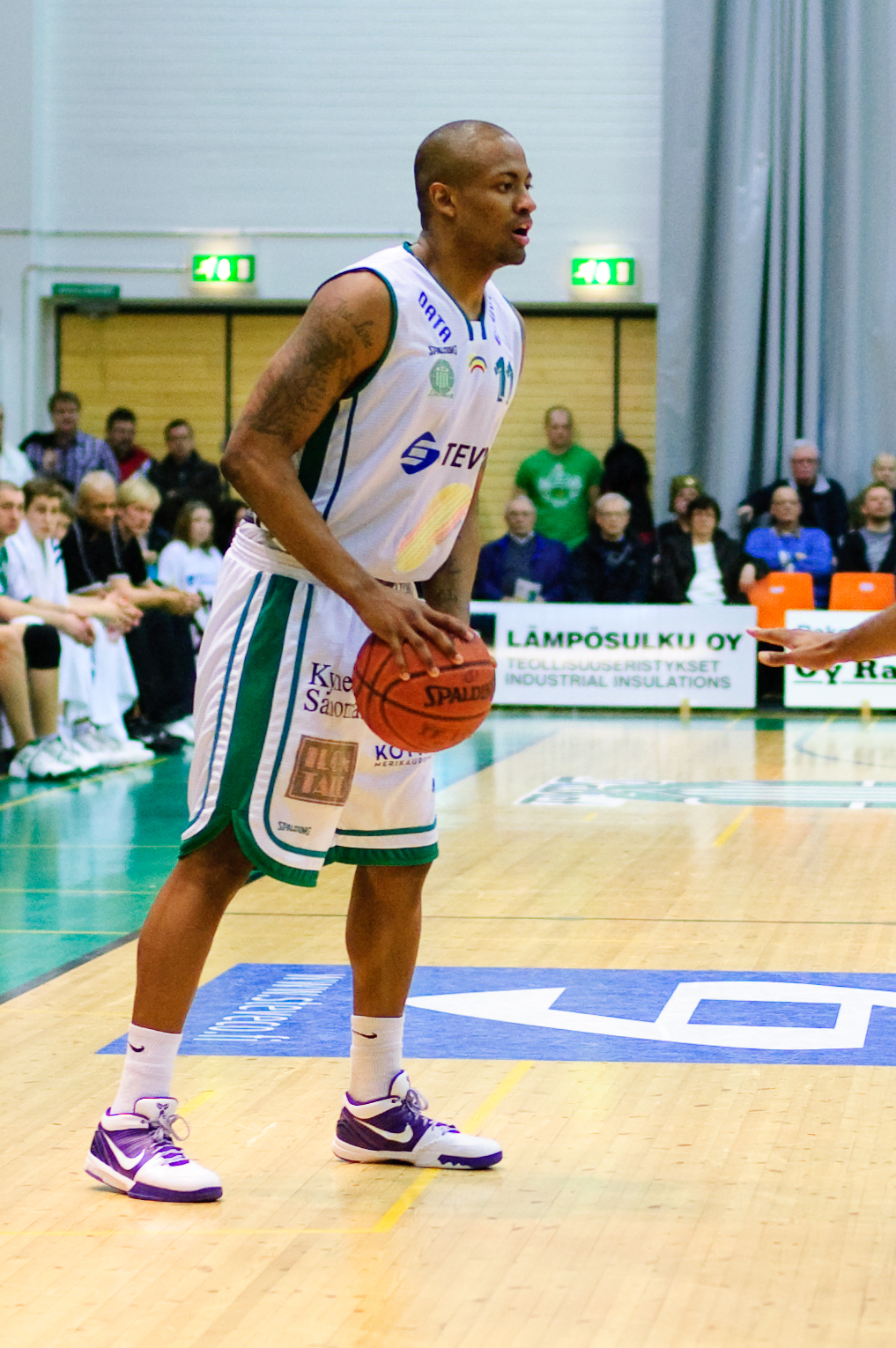

Free agent
- Position: Point guard

Personal information
- Born: September 27, 1981 (age 45) Brooklyn, New York
- Listed height: 6 ft 3 in (1.91 m)
- Listed weight: 200 lb (91 kg)

Career information
- High school: Lake Howell (Winter Park, Florida)
- College: Des Moines Area CC (2001–2003); Auburn (2003–2005)
- NBA draft: 2005: undrafted
- Playing career: 2005–2016 (retired)

Career history
- 2005–2006: HKK Široki
- 2006–2007: ratiopharm Ulm
- 2012: Gaiteros de Zulia
- 2014–2015: Macaé Basquete
- 2016–2017: KTP
- 2017: Caballeros de Culiacan

Ian Curtis Young (born September 27, 1981) is an American-Trinidadian professional basketball player. Standing at 6 ft 3 in (1.91 m), Young primarily plays as point guard. Young played 13 professional years overseas in various countries. Before turning professional, Ian was an All-SEC point guard at Auburn University and a 2-Time Junior College All-American at Des Moines Area CC (DMACC).

== International career ==
He represented Trinidad and Tobago's national basketball team at the 2010 Centrobasket in Santo Domingo, Dominican Republic, where he recorded most points and assists for his team. In the 2009 CBC Trinidad finished in fourth place with a 3–1 record led by Ian Young who averaged 18.6 PPG and 8.0 APG.

He signed with the Brujos de Guayama of the Baloncesto Superior Nacional appearing in two games.
