= Trinidad and Tobago women's national under-17 basketball team =

Trinidad and Tobago
- FIBA zone: FIBA Americas

World Championships
- Appearances: None

Americas Championships
- Appearances: None

The Trinidad and Tobago women's national under-16 and under-17 basketball team is a national basketball team of Trinidad and Tobago, administered by the National Basketball Federation of Trinidad and Tobago.

It represents the country in international under-16 and under-17 (under age 16 and under age 17) women's basketball competitions.

It appeared at the 2016 CBC U16 Championship for Women.

== See also ==
- Trinidad and Tobago women's national basketball team
- Trinidad and Tobago men's national under-17 basketball team
