= Jackie Manuel =

American basketball player and coach

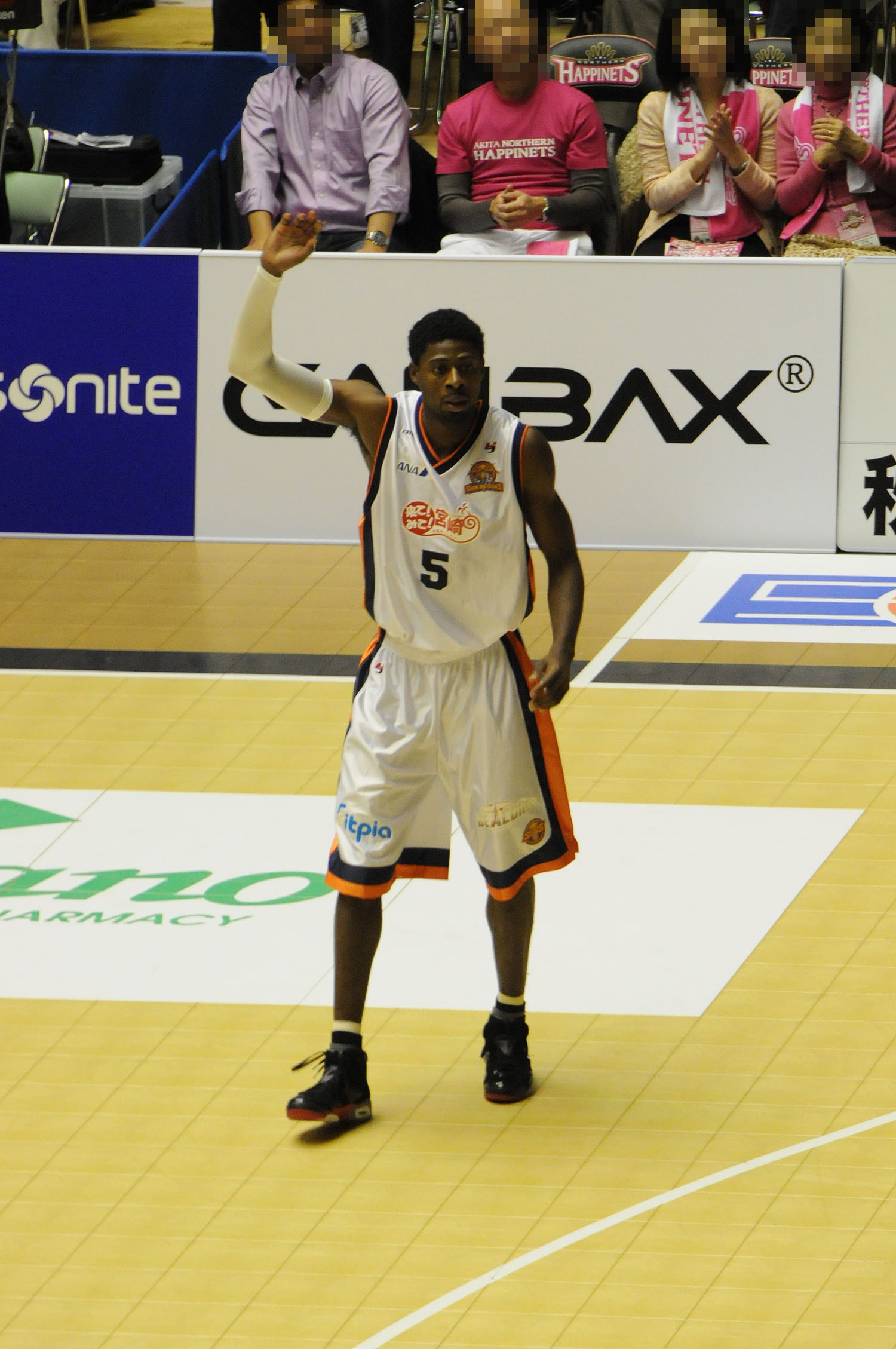

American Eagles
- Title: Assistant coach
- League: Patriot League

Personal information
- Born: March 29, 1983 (age 43)
- Listed height: 6 ft 5 in (1.96 m)
- Listed weight: 190 lb (86 kg)

Career information
- High school: Cardinal Newman (West Palm Beach, Florida)
- College: North Carolina (2001–2005)
- NBA draft: 2005: undrafted
- Playing career: 2006–2011
- Position: Shooting guard
- Number: 5
- Coaching career: 2011–present

Career history

Playing
- 2006–2007: Los Angeles D-Fenders
- 2007–2008: Iowa Energy
- 2008–2010: Erie BayHawks
- 2010–2011: Miyazaki Shining Suns

Coaching
- 2011–2012: North Carolina (asst. strength)
- 2012–2016: UNC Greensboro (assistant)
- 2016–2017: Valparaiso (assistant)
- 2017–2020: UNC Wilmington (assistant)
- 2020–2021: North Carolina (women's) (Dir. Player Personnel)
- 2021–2023: North Carolina (Dir. Player/Team Development)
- 2023–present: American (assistant)

Career highlights
- NCAA champion (2005); 2× ACC All-Defensive Team (2004, 2005)

Jackie Kameron Manuel (born March 29, 1983) is an American basketball coach and former player who is an assistant coach at American University of the Patriot League.

== College career ==
Born in West Palm Beach, Florida, Manuel gained notoriety as a defensive specialist for the North Carolina Tar Heels from 2001 to 2005. He started 85 out of 126 games for the Tar Heels. Manuel was also a tri-captain of UNC's 2005 National championship team.

== Professional career ==
=== NBA D-League ===
After not being selected in the 2005 NBA draft, Manuel was selected by the Los Angeles D-Fenders of the NBA Development League expansion draft. In 2005, he was injured most of the D-League season; he was signed by the Fayetteville Patriots but did not play one game due to injury. In 2006, he was selected by the NBDL representative of the Los Angeles Lakers.

=== NBA career ===
On August 1, 2007, the Boston Celtics signed Manuel to a non-guaranteed one-year contract. On October 25, however, Manuel was waived by the team.

=== Return to the NBA D-League ===
On Sept. 24, 2008, Manuel would be selected as the expansion Erie BayHawks' second overall pick in the 2008 NBA D-League Expansion Draft.

== Coaching career ==
=== North Carolina assistant (2011–2012) ===
In 2011, Manuel joined Roy Williams' staff at UNC as assistant strength and conditioning coordinator.

=== UNC Greensboro assistant (2012–2016) ===
After a one-year stint at UNC, Manuel joined former North Carolina teammate Wes Miller's coaching staff at UNC-Greensboro for the 2012–2013 season.

=== Valparaiso assistant (2016) ===
After four years at UNCG, Manuel moved to Valparaiso to be an assistant for Matt Lottich.

=== UNC Wilmington assistant (2017–2020) ===
When former UNC assistant C.B. McGrath was named head coach at UNC Wilmington, Manuel was an assistant for him for four years.

=== Return to Chapel Hill ===
==== UNC women's assistant (2020–21) ====
Manuel joined the UNC women's basketball staff as Director of Player Personnel, Development and Recruiting Operations in September 2020. On April 13, 2021, head coach Courtney Banghart posted a tweet indicating Manuel was leaving the UNC women's team to pursue other opportunities.

==== Return to the men's staff (2021–2023) ====
On April 15, 2021, Manuel was announced as the Director of Player and Team Development for Hubert Davis' inaugural North Carolina coaching staff. Manuel joins former Tar Heel players Jeff Lebo, Sean May, and Brad Frederick as members of the coaching staff. Manuel's role, unlike the other three, was not an on-bench position.

=== American University assistant (2023–present) ===
Manuel left his alma mater once again in April 2023 to join Duane Simpkins' staff at American University. Manuel and Simpkins were both assistant coaches under Wes Miller at UNCG.

== Personal life ==
Manuel was married in August 2005 to his wife Ronda Jae.

In high school, Manuel won two state championships at Cardinal Newman High School in West Palm Beach, Florida. He earned a B.A. in African-American studies from the University of North Carolina at Chapel Hill in May 2005. In February 2010, Manuel earned a certificate in coaching from Michigan State University.

On November 28, 2007, Manuel's brother, Donta, a thirteen-year veteran of the Palm Beach County Sheriff's Office, was killed while he was removing stop sticks from a roadway during a police chase. A pursued stolen car had passed by and while Deputy Manuel was removing the stop sticks, a patrol car in pursuit of the stolen car hit him and his partner, Deputy Jonathan Wallace, killing both.

== Awards ==
- All-ACC Defensive Team: 2004, 2005.
