= Daisuke Takaoka =

Japanese basketball coach

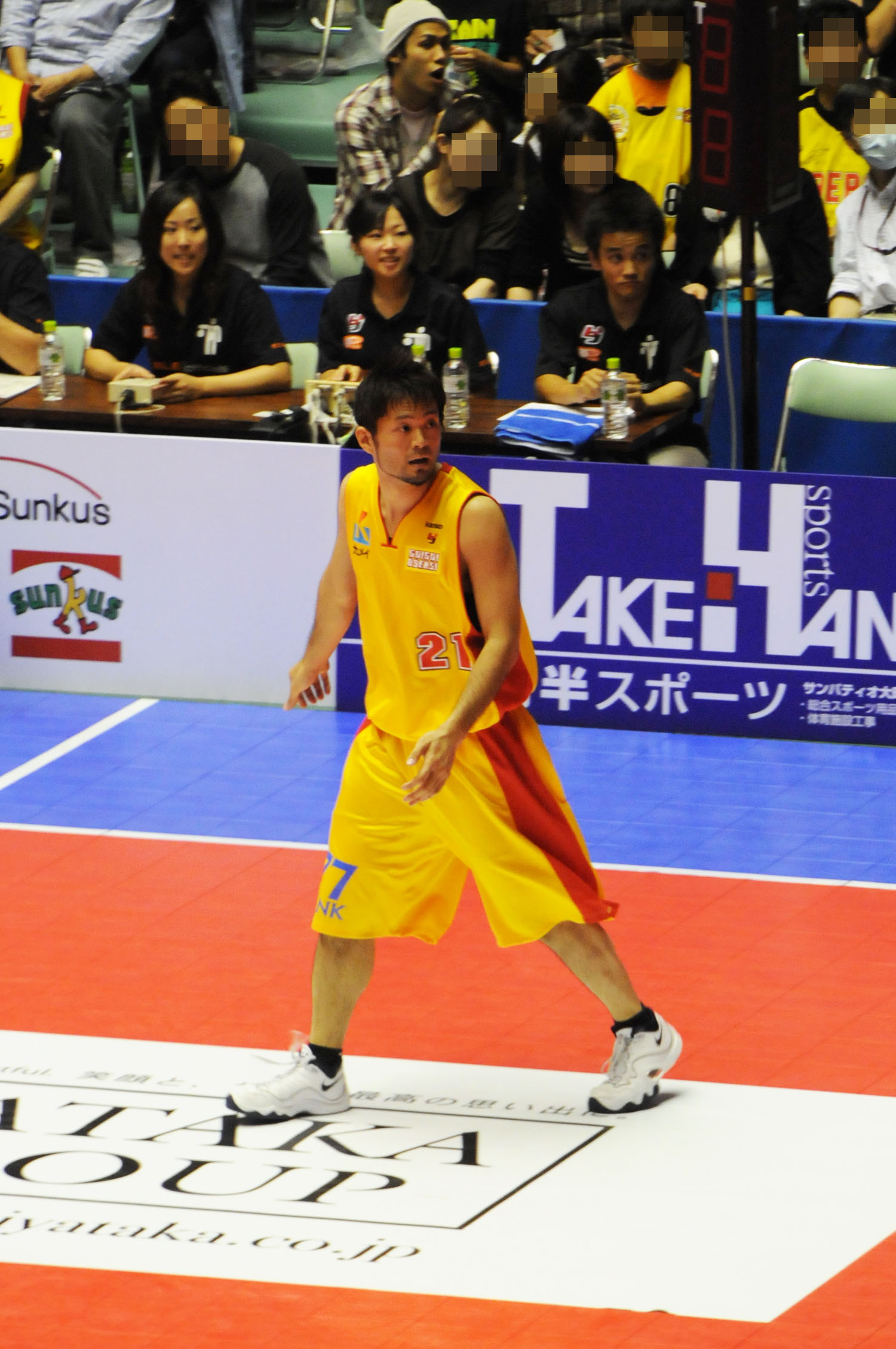
- Takaoka in 2009

Toyama Grouses
- Position: Assistant coach
- League: B.League

Personal information
- Born: October 14, 1981 (age 45) Nagasaki Prefecture, Japan
- Listed height: 6 ft 4 in (1.93 m)
- Listed weight: 209 lb (95 kg)

Career information
- High school: Keiho (Nagasaki, Nagasaki)
- College: Takushoku University
- Playing career: 2004–2016

Career history

Playing
- 2004–2007: Otsuka Corporation Alphas
- 2007–2009: Link Tochigi Brex
- 2009–2011: Sendai 89ers
- 2011: Miyazaki Shining Suns
- 2011–2013: Sendai 89ers
- 2013–2015: Aomori Wat's
- 2015–2016: Sendai 89ers

Coaching
- 2016-2018: Sendai 89ers (asst)
- 2018: Sendai 89ers
- 2019-: Toyama Grouses (asst)

Career highlights
- JBL2 Best5; JBL2 Champions

Daisuke Takaoka (高岡大輔, Takaoka Daisuke) is the assistant coach of the Toyama Grouses in the Japanese B.League.

== Head coaching record ==
Legend
Regular season	G	Games coached	W	Games won	L	Games lost	W–L %	Win–loss %
Playoffs	PG	Playoff games	PW	Playoff wins	PL	Playoff losses	PW–L %	Playoff win–loss %

Team	Year	G	W	L	W–L%	Finish	PG	PW	PL	PW–L%	Result
Sendai 89ers	2018	32	8	24	.250	4th in B2 Eastern	-	-	-	–	
