= Ryukyu Golden Kings =

Professional basketball team in Okinawa, Japan

- Leagues: B.League
- Founded: 2007; 19 years ago
- Arena: Okinawa Arena
- Capacity: 10,000
- Location: Okinawa, Okinawa Prefecture
- Team colors: Champagne Gold, Steel Blue and Pearl Red
- Main sponsor: Zenhoren
- President: Tatsuro Kimura
- Head coach: Dai Oketani
- Championships: 1 B.League; 4 bj League
- Conference titles: 6 bj League Western Conference
- Retired numbers: 1 (50)
- Website: goldenkings.jp
Home	Away	Third

The Ryukyu Golden Kings (琉球ゴールデンキングス, Ryūkyū Gōruden Kingusu) are a Japanese professional basketball team based in Okinawa, Okinawa Prefecture. The team competes in the B.League Premier, the highest division of the B.League, as a member of the Western Conference. The team plays its home games at Okinawa Arena.

The Golden Kings have won the Japanese national title five times, as they won the bj league four times (2009, 2012, 2014, 2016) and the B.League once (2023). They were also losing B.League finalists once (2022).

== Honours ==
=== Domestic ===
- B.League champions: 1
  - 2022–23
- bj league champions: 4
  - 2009, 2012, 2014, 2016

=== Continental ===
- ABA Club Championship
  - 3rd: 2011
- East Asia Super League champions:
  - 2018

== Players ==
Ryukyu Golden Kings roster
Players
Coaches

Pos.	No.	Nat.	Name	Ht.	Age
PG	3	(Japan)	Tatsuya Ito	1.73 m (5 ft 8 in)	31 – 26 November 1994
SF	4	(United States)	Vic Law	2.01 m (6 ft 7 in)	30 – 19 December 1995
F	8	(Japan)	Yoshiya Uematsu	1.90 m (6 ft 3 in)	27 – 18 December 1998
G	10	(Japan)	Hayate Arakawa	1.82 m (6 ft 0 in)	29 – 25 July 1997
F	12	(United States)	Keve Aluma	2.06 m (6 ft 9 in)	27 – 31 December 1998
G	14	(Japan)	Ryuichi Kishimoto	1.76 m (5 ft 9 in)	36 – 17 May 1990
G	15	(Japan)	Yoshiyuki Matsuwaki	1.85 m (6 ft 1 in)	29 – 15 May 1997
G	18	(Japan)	Masahiro Waki	1.93 m (6 ft 4 in)	24 – 11 March 2002
G	34	(Japan)	Shota Onodera	1.82 m (6 ft 0 in)	31 – 6 November 1994
C	45	(United States)	Jack Cooley	2.06 m (6 ft 9 in)	35 – 12 April 1991
C	53	(United States)	Alex Kirk	2.11 m (6 ft 11 in)	34 – 14 November 1991

Head coach

Dai Oketani

Assistant coach(es)

Takahiro Morishige
Kensuke Hosaka
Anthony McHenry
Keith Richardson

Legend

- (C) Team captain
- Injured

- Roster
Updated: October 5, 2024

== Coaches ==
- Hernando Planells (2007–2008)
- Dai Oketani
- Koto Toyama
- Tsutomu Isa
- Norio Sassa
- Hiroki Fujita

== Seasons ==
=== B.League ===
Season	Result	Regular season Record (W-L)	Playoff Record
2016-2017	QuarterFinals	29-31	0-2
2017-2018	SemiFinals	42-18	2-3
2018-2019	SemiFinals	40-20	3-3
2019-2020	N/A	27-14	Playoffs cancelled (COVID-19)
2020-2021	SemiFinals	40-16	3-3
2021-2022	Finals	49-7	4-2
2022-2023	Champions	48-12	6-0
2023-2024	Finals	41-19	5-4
2024-2025	Finals	46-14	5-3
2025-2026	Finals	42-18	5-2

Key
Champions
Losing Finalists
Made the Playoffs

== Notable players ==
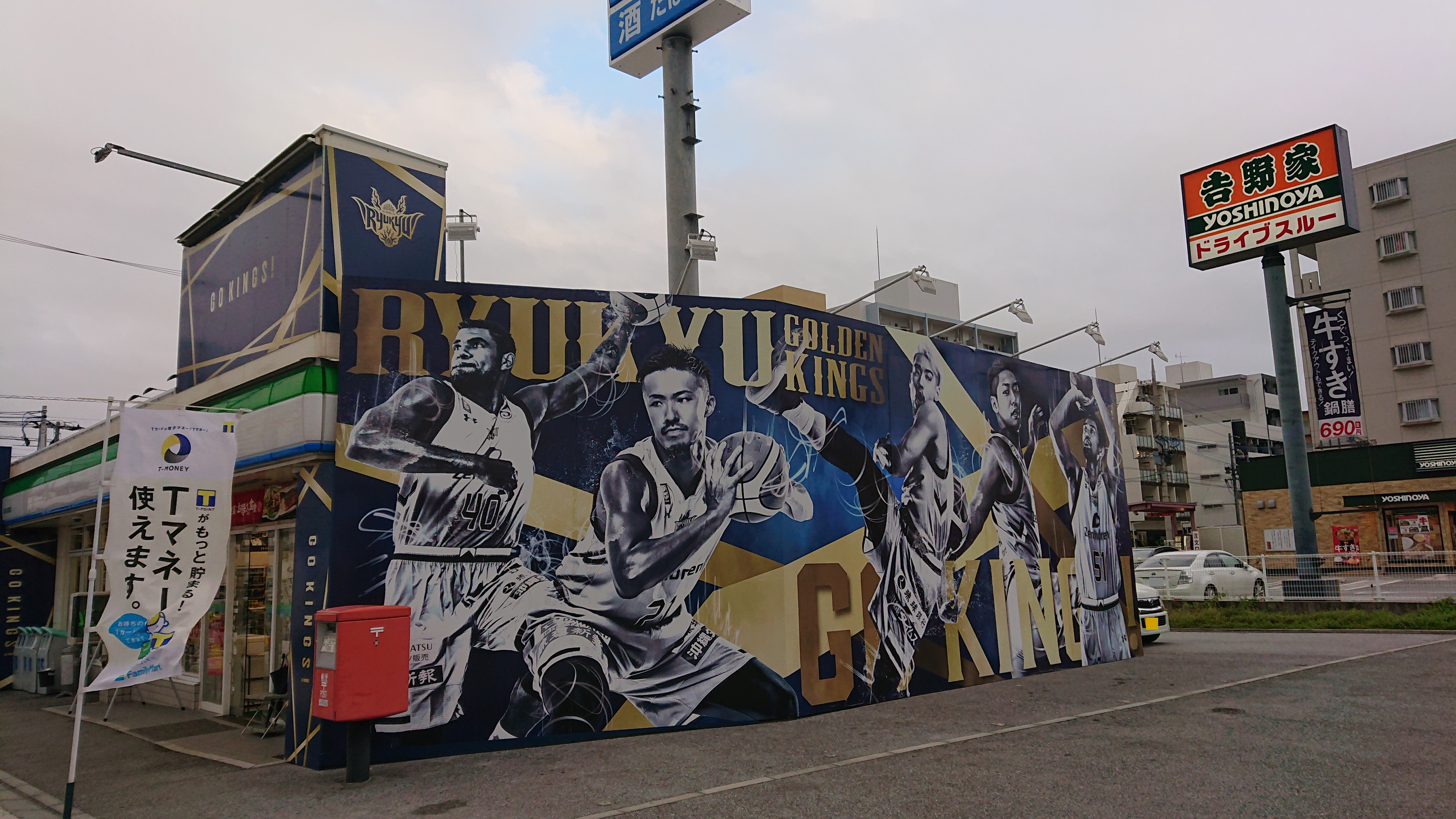
Ryukyu Golden Kings promotional art at FamilyMart's Chatan Town Hall location, 2019

- Hilton Armstrong
- Chris Ayer
- Ira Brown
- Draelon Burns
- Mo Charlo
- Takatoshi Furukawa
- Lamont Hamilton
- Takumi Ishizaki
- Anthony Kent (it)
- George Leach
- Anthony McHenry
- Jeff Newton
- Evan Ravenel
- Bryan Simpson
- Dillion Sneed
- Reyshawn Terry
- Kibwe Trim
- Terrance Woodbury
- Jack Cooley

== Arenas ==
- Okinawa Arena
- Okinawa City Gymnasium
- Ginowan City Gymnasium
