= Shota Onodera =

Japanese basketball player

Shota Onodera 小野寺祥太
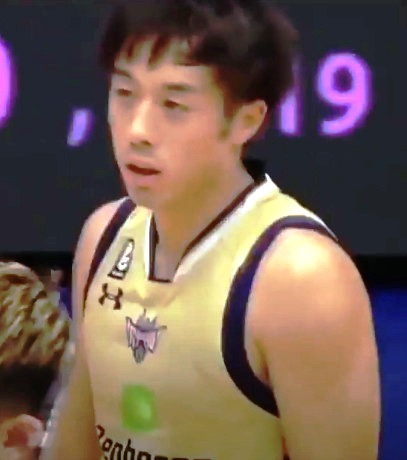

No. 34 – Ryukyu Golden Kings
- Position: Point guard / shooting guard
- League: B.League

Personal information
- Born: November 6, 1994 (age 32) Ichinoseki, Iwate, Japan
- Listed height: 6 ft 0 in (1.83 m)
- Listed weight: 161 lb (73 kg)

Career information
- High school: Morioka Minami (Morioka, Iwate)
- Playing career: 2013–present

Career history
- 2013–2017: Iwate Big Bulls
- 2017–2019: Akita Northern Happinets
- 2019–present: Ryukyu Golden Kings

Shota Onodera (born November 6, 1994) is a Japanese professional basketball player who plays for Ryukyu Golden Kings of the B.League in Japan. On January 25, 2015, he recorded a career-high 27 points in a win to the Gunma Crane Thunders.

== Career statistics ==
Legend
| GP | Games played | GS | Games started | MPG | Minutes per game |
| FG% | Field goal percentage | 3P% | 3-point field goal percentage | FT% | Free throw percentage |
| RPG | Rebounds per game | APG | Assists per game | SPG | Steals per game |
| BPG | Blocks per game | PPG | Points per game | **Bold** | Career high |

=== Regular season ===
| Year | Team | GP | GS | MPG | FG% | 3P% | FT% | RPG | APG | SPG | BPG | PPG |
|---|---|---|---|---|---|---|---|---|---|---|---|---|
| 2013–14 | Iwate | 34 | 4 | 9.8 | 36.5 | 16.7 | 66.7 | 0.9 | 0.4 | 0.6 | 0.1 | 2.1 |
| 2014–15 | Iwate | 52 | 29 | 17.5 | **43.3** | **40.3** | **76.0** | 1.8 | 0.8 | 0.6 | 0.0 | 5.9 |
| 2015–16 | Iwate | 48 | 24 | 19.6 | 38.9 | 33.8 | 62.9 | 1.9 | 0.9 | **0.8** | 0.1 | 5.4 |
| 2016-17 | Iwate | **56** | 24 | **24.5** | 34.3 | 28.7 | 72.0 | 2.0 | 1.4 | 0.5 | **0.2** | 7.3 |
| 2017-18 | Akita | **56** | 36 | 19.2 | 41.3 | 32.8 | 65.2 | **2.1** | **2.7** | **0.8** | 0.1 | **7.8** |
| 2018-19 | Akita | 47 | **37** | 24.4 | 36.9 | 30.6 | 69.9 | 1.8 | 3.0 | **0.8** | 0.1 | 5.8 |
| 2019-20 | Ryukyu | 39 | 23 | 18.5 | 37.8 | 22.2 | 63.2 | 1.8 | 1.2 | 0.7 | 0.1 | 4.5 |
| 2020-21 | Ryukyu | 25 | 1 | 8.0 | .412 | .350 | .583 | 0.8 | 0.4 | 0.3 | 0.0 | 1.7 |

=== Playoffs ===
| Year | Team | GP | GS | MPG | FG% | 3P% | FT% | RPG | APG | SPG | BPG | PPG |
|---|---|---|---|---|---|---|---|---|---|---|---|---|
| 2017-18 | Akita | 5 | 5 | 17.16 | .382 | .333 | .500 | 2.4 | 3.6 | 1.2 | 0 | 6.2 |

=== Terrific 12 ===
| Year | Team | GP | GS | MPG | FG% | 3P% | FT% | RPG | APG | SPG | BPG | PPG |
|---|---|---|---|---|---|---|---|---|---|---|---|---|
| 2019 | Ryukyu | 2 | | 21.2 | | | | 3.0 | 4.0 | 0.5 | 0.0 | 4.0 |

=== Early cup games ===
| Year | Team | GP | GS | MPG | FG% | 3P% | FT% | RPG | APG | SPG | BPG | PPG |
|---|---|---|---|---|---|---|---|---|---|---|---|---|
| 2017 | Akita | 2 | 1 | 24:19 | .429 | .400 | .500 | 0.5 | 1.5 | 0.5 | 0 | 4.5 |
| 2018 | Akita | 2 | 1 | 24:06 | .429 | .000 | .500 | 3.5 | 2.5 | 1.5 | 0 | 7.5 |
| 2019 | Ryukyu | 2 | 1 | 20:00 | .286 | .000 | .500 | 1.5 | 2.5 | 0.5 | 0 | 2.5 |

=== Preseason games ===
| Year | Team | GP | GS | MPG | FG% | 3P% | FT% | RPG | APG | SPG | BPG | PPG |
|---|---|---|---|---|---|---|---|---|---|---|---|---|
| 2018 | Akita | 2 | 1 | 18.0 | .273 | .167 | .500 | 1.0 | 2.5 | 0.0 | 0.0 | 4.5 |

Source: Changwon1Changwon2

== Number 34 ==
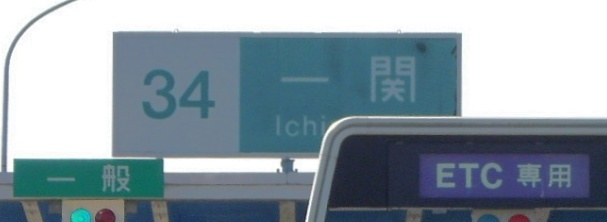

Onodera has revealed that he wears the number 34 shirt because it is the interchange number of Ichinoseki where he was born, the Akita Sakigake reported.

== Athletic taping ==
He uses the Nichiban sports tapes.
