= Hiroki Fujita =

Japanese basketball player and coach

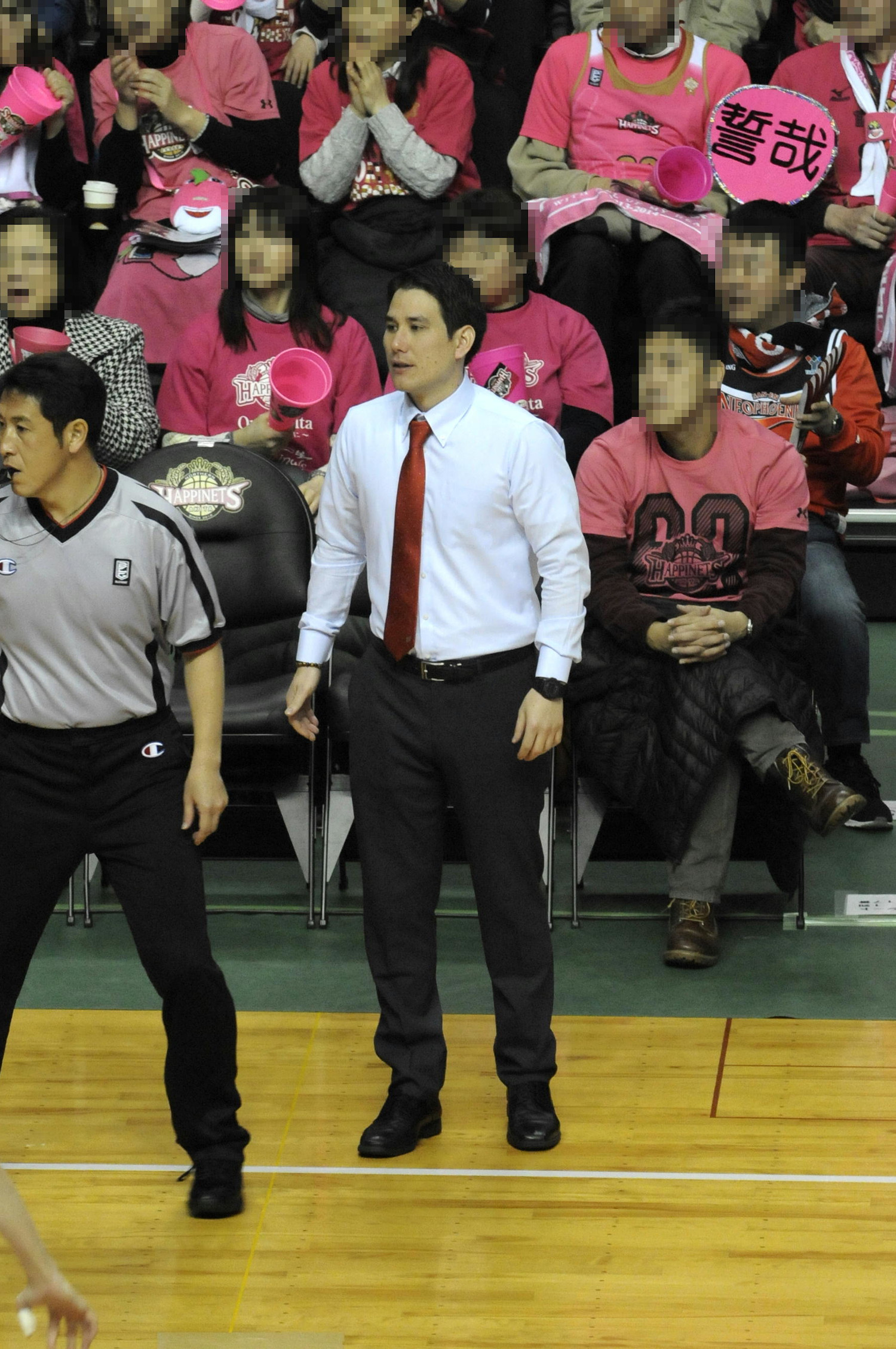
- Fujita with San-en

Sendai 89ers
- Position: Head coach
- League: B.League

Personal information
- Born: April 16, 1986 (age 40) San Francisco, California, U.S.
- Listed height: 5 ft 11 in (1.80 m)
- Listed weight: 165 lb (75 kg)

Career information
- College: University of Hawaii at Hilo
- Coaching career: 2013–present

Career history

Playing
- 2008-2010: Hamamatsu Higashimikawa Phoenix
- 2010-2011: Miyazaki Shining Suns

Coaching
- 2013: Gunma Crane Thunders (asst.)
- 2013–2014: Gunma Crane Thunders
- 2014-2016: Fukushima Firebonds
- 2016-2019: San-en NeoPhoenix
- 2019: Ryukyu Golden Kings (asst.)
- 2019-2021: Ryukyu Golden Kings
- 2021-present: Sendai 89ers

Theo Hiroki Fujita (藤田弘輝, Fujita Hiroki) is the head coach of the Sendai 89ers in the Japanese B.League.

== Head coaching record ==
Legend
Regular season	G	Games coached	W	Games won	L	Games lost	W–L %	Win–loss %
Playoffs	PG	Playoff games	PW	Playoff wins	PL	Playoff losses	PW–L %	Playoff win–loss %

Team	Year	G	W	L	W–L%	Finish	PG	PW	PL	PW–L%	Result
Gunma Crane Thunders	2013-14	32	10	22	.313	10th in Eastern	-	-	-	–	-
Fukushima Firebonds	2014-15	52	21	31	.404	7th in Eastern	2	0	2	.000	Lost in 1st round
Fukushima Firebonds	2015-16	52	30	22	.577	6th in Eastern	2	0	2	.000	Lost in 1st round
San-en NeoPhoenix	2016-17	60	33	27	.550	2nd in Central	2	0	2	.000	Lost in 1st round
San-en NeoPhoenix	2017-18	60	25	35	.417	4th in Central	-	-	-	–	-
San-en NeoPhoenix	2018-19	60	22	38	.367	5th in Central	-	-	-	–	-
Ryukyu Golden Kings	2019-20	21	14	7	.667	1st in Western	-	-	-	–	-
