= Belize men's national basketball team =

Belize
- FIBA ranking: 123 (2 December 2025)
- Joined FIBA: 1973
- FIBA zone: FIBA Americas
- Coach: Marques Johnson

Olympic Games
- Appearances: None
- Medals: None

FIBA World Cup
- Appearances: None
- Medals: None

FIBA AmeriCup
- Appearances: None
- Medals: None
Home	Away

The Belize national basketball team is the official national representative of Belize in international men's basketball, playing in the FIBA Americas division, and more specifically, within the Central American region.

== Men ==
The men's team has little to no international experience. Its first major victory in international play came on home soil in the 1998 Caricom Men's Basketball Championship, held at the Civic Center in Belize City, Belize. Belize placed seventh of eight teams in the 1999 Centrobasquet Tournament in Havana after winning only one game despite playing close all the way. In a return engagement at the 2000 CARICOM Championship in Barbados, Belize placed fourth. Shortly after that, Belize moved to the Central American region and won the Central American Games championship in 2001. The team has failed to duplicate this success, most recently finishing with a 2 and 4 record in the 2006 COCABA Championship.

The team finished second in the 2009 COCABA tournament in Cancun, Mexico where it went 3–0 in group play despite allegations of fielding ineligible players. FIBA decided to treat the Belize National Team's games as unofficial and initially decided to disqualify them from the competition for having more than one naturalized citizen on their team. Belize won an appeal to the Court of Arbitration for Sport in April 2010, the players in question are Belizean by descent, not naturalization.

Belize won its opening match in the Centrobasquet Tournament, defeating Trinidad and Tobago, but lost badly to Mexico in a rematch of the COCABA final. A tough win over Cuba set Belize in a position to advance, but they fell to Puerto Rico in their final match and failed to qualify.

== Current roster ==
At the 2010 Centrobasket: (last publicized squad)

Belize men's national basketball team roster
Players
Coaches

Pos.	No.	Name	Age – Date of birth	Height	Club	Ctr.
	4	Darwin Raymond Leslie	28 – 27 July 1981
	5	Milton Palacio	32 – 7 February 1978			(Russia)
	6	Leon Dwayne Jacob	26 – 17 March 1984
	7	Leon Robert Watson	33 – 19 August 1976
	8	Alex Leo Carcamo	32 – 28 August 1977
	9	Charles Heny Burgess	26 – 3 April 1984			(Hungary)
	10	Richard Douglas Troyer	26 – 3 March 1984
	11	Kenton Levio Paulino	27 – 23 June 1983
	12	Oscar Darwin Carter	33 – 28 September 1976
	13	Elsworth Orlando Itza	26 – 12 November 1983
	14	Kenan Raymond Jourdon	35 – 12 July 1974
	15	Keith Raymond Acosta	33 – 19 December 1976			(Bolivia)

Head coach

- (United States) Marques Johnson

Assistant coaches

Legend

- Club – describes last
  club before the tournament
- Age – describes age
  on 5 July 2010

== Team members ==
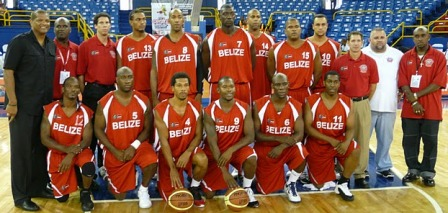
Belize National Basketball Team 2010

Front L-R Darwin Carter, Milt Palacio, Darwin Leslie, Charlie Burgess, Leon Jacobs, Kenton Paulino Back L-R Coach Marques Johnson, Darren Bovel, Asst. Coach Alex Lloyd, Elsworth Itza, Alex Carcamo, Sonny Watson, Keenan Jourdon, Keith Acosta, Richard Troyer, Asst Coach Kevin Siroki, Thomas Shaw, Quinton Hamilton

== Most recent games ==
- 1st group match, Centrobasket: Belize 80–71 Trinidad and Tobago
- Final, 2009 COCABA Championship, Cancun, Mexico: Mexico 106–103 Belize
- Semifinal, 2009 COCABA Championship: Belize 99–75 Costa Rica
- 3rd group match: Belize 92–88 Panama
- 2nd group match: Belize 100–63 Guatemala
- 1st group match: Belize 98–67 Nicaragua

== International competitions ==
=== Olympics ===
No appearances

=== FIBA World Cup ===
No appearances

=== FIBA AmeriCup ===
No appearances

== Regional championships ==
- Centrobasket 2010: finished fourth in group
- Centrobasket 1999: 7th

=== CARICOM Men's Championships ===
- 2000: 4th (in Barbados)
- 1998: Champions (in Belize)

=== COCABA championships ===
- 2009: 2nd
- 2007: did not participate
- 2006: 3rd
- 2004: 7th
- 2001: did not participate
