= Bryan Simpson (basketball) =

American basketball player

Personal information
- Born: October 15, 1984 (age 42) Stone Mountain, Georgia
- Listed height: 6 ft 6 in (1.98 m)
- Listed weight: 228 lb (103 kg)

Career information
- High school: Redan (Stone Mountain, Georgia)
- Position: Small forward

Career history
- 2006-2007: Kadena Falcons
- 2007-2010: Ryukyu Golden Kings
- 2010-2017: Check Mate
- 2017-2019: Tokio Marine Nichido Big Blue

Career highlights
- bj League Champions (2008-09)

Bryan Simpson (born October 15, 1984) is an American professional basketball player who last played for Tokio Marine Nichido Big Blue in Japan. He was selected by the Ryukyu Golden Kings with the 7th overall pick in the 2007 bj League draft. He played for Okinawa for three seasons.
