= Deon Jones =

American basketball player

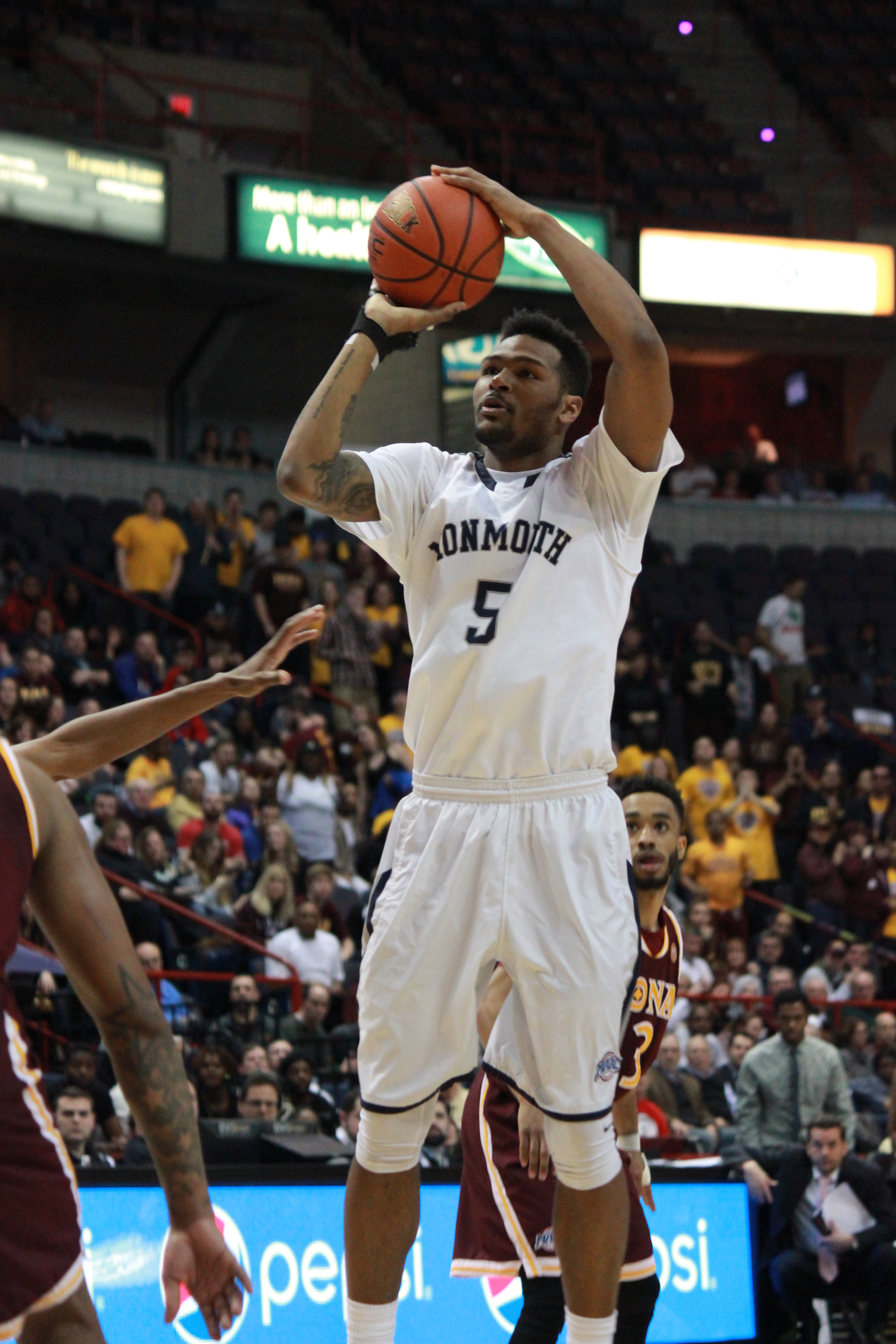

Personal information
- Born: January 4, 1993 (age 33) Chester, Pennsylvania
- Listed height: 6 ft 6 in (1.98 m)
- Listed weight: 210 lb (95 kg)

Career information
- High school: Sanford School (Hockessin, Delaware)
- College: Towson (2011–2012); Monmouth (2013–2016)
- NBA draft: 2016: undrafted
- Playing career: 2016–2018
- Position: Shooting guard
- Number: 23

Career history
- 2016–2017: Earthfriends Tokyo Z
- 2017–2018: Fukushima Firebonds

Deon Jones (born January 4, 1993) is an American professional basketball player who last played for Fukushima Firebonds in Japan.

As a senior at Monmouth, Jones averaged 10.4 points and 6.3 rebounds per game.
