= Fukushima Firebonds =

Professional basketball team in Japan

- Leagues: B.League
- Founded: 2013
- History: 2014–present
- Arena: Koriyama General Gymnasium (capacity: 7,056)
- Location: Fukushima Prefecture
- Team colors: Fuchsia
- Main sponsor: Niraku Pachinko
- President: Eiji Miyata
- Head coach: Ryan Marchand
- Ownership: Shikigaku Co., Ltd.
- Championships: 0
- Website: firebonds.jp
Home	Away

The Fukushima Firebonds (福島ファイヤーボンズ, Fukushima Faiyābonzu) are a Japanese professional basketball team based in Kōriyama, Fukushima Prefecture. The team competes in the B.League One, the second division of the B.League, as a member of the Northern Conference.

== History ==
In May 2013 Fukushima Prefecture was announced as the successful bidder for an expansion franchise to enter the 2014–15 season of the bj-league. The league management included the region's recovery from the 2011 Tōhoku earthquake and tsunami and the long-term feasibility of the bidding company, Fukushima Sports Entertainment, as reasons for the successful bid.

In June 2014, the team announced Hiroki Fujita as the inaugural head coach.

As an expansion team, the Firebonds received the first pick in the 2014–15 rookie draft, selecting forward Shota Kanno, a Fukushima Prefecture native. Takumi Masuko was selected in the second round. In July 2014 the team signed American players James Hughes and Nick Thompson as their two foreign players.

=== 2014–15 season ===
The team commenced play in the bj-league in October 2014 and had their first regular-season win in a match against the Aomori Wat's on 5 October 2015. The team finished the season with a 21–31 record, securing a playoff berth in the second-last game of the regular season. They were eliminated in the first round of the playoffs 0–2 by the Iwate Big Bulls.

=== 2015–16 season ===
During the off-season, the team renewed the contract of Fujita as head coach and signed Le'Bryan Nash, Joseph Taylor and Stephan Van Treese as import players. Masaya Karimata was named team captain and Kenya Tomori was named vice-captain.

== Current roster ==
Fukushima Firebonds roster
Players
Coaches

Pos.	No.	Nat.	Name
SG	1	(Japan)	Tsukasa Nakano
G	4	(Japan)	Wataru Igari
G	5	(Japan)	Kenya Tomori
SG	6	(Japan)	Tomonobu Hasegawa
PG	7	(South Korea)	Gibeom Cheon
PG	8	(Japan)	Shinya Murakami (C)
SG	11	(Japan)	Tsubasa Yamauchi
PG	12	(Japan)	Daiki Tsuchiya
PG	13	(Japan)	Ao Honda
PG	14	(Japan)	Yuji Takahashi
G	16	(Japan)	Naoaki Hashimoto
G/F	21	(Japan)	Shota Kanno
G/F	24	(United States)	Addison Spruill
F/C	55	(United States)	Josh Harrellson
F/C	88	(Venezuela)	Gregory Echenique

Head coach

Ryan Marchand

Assistant coach(es)

Takahiro Kurihara

Legend

- (C) Team captain
- Injured

- Roster
Updated: March 27, 2023

== Notable players ==
- Solomon Alabi
- Deon Jones
- Cedric Bozeman
- Shaheed Davis
- Verdell Jones
- Bingo Merriex
- Alex Murphy
- Le'Bryan Nash
- Tshilidzi Nephawe
- Evan Ravenel
- Nigel Spikes

== Coaches ==
- Ryan Marchand
- Enrique Zúñiga
- Hiroki Fujita
- Tomohiro Moriyama
- Kimitoshi Sano

== Results by year ==
=== Bj-League ===
Season	Regular season				Head coach	Notes
Season	Wins	Losses	Win %	Placing	Head coach	Notes
2014–15	21	31	.404	7th (East)	Hiroki Fujita	Eliminated in first round of playoffs
2015–16	30	22	.577	6th (East)	Hiroki Fujita	Eliminated in first round of playoffs

=== B2 League ===
Season	Regular season				Head coach	Notes
Season	Wins	Losses	Win %	Placing	Head coach	Notes
2016–17	30	30	.500	3rd (East)	Tomohiro Moriyama	
2017–18	38	22	.633	2nd (East)	Tomohiro Moriyama	
2018–19	27	33	.450	4th (East)	Tomohiro Moriyama	
2019–20	16	31	.340	5th (East)	Tomohiro Moriyama	
2020–21	27	31	.466	6th (East)	Tomohiro Moriyama	
2021–22	34	18	.654	3rd (East)	Tomohiro Moriyama	Eliminated in first round of playoffs
2022–23	28	32	.467	4th (East)	Sano Kintoshi	Eliminated in first round of playoffs
2023–24	24	36	.400	5th (East)	Eric Weissling; Takahiro Kurihara (from December)	
2024–25	15	45	.250	7th (East)	Takahiro Kurihara	
2025-26	42	18	.700	2nd (East)	Ryan Marchand	Finals Runner-Up

== Arenas ==
- Koriyama General Gymnasium
- Fukushima Toyota Crown Arena
- Iwaki General Gymnasium
- Tamura City General Gymnasium
- Aizu General Gymnasium
- Shirakawa City Central Gymnasium
- Inawashiro Town General Gymnasium
