= Miyazaki Shining Suns =

- Leagues: bj league
- Founded: 2010
- Folded: 2013
- Arena: Miyazaki Prefectural Gymnasium
- Capacity: 4,180
- Location: Miyazaki, Japan
- Team colors: Orange, Black
- Championships: 0
Home	Away

The Miyazaki Shining Suns were a Japanese basketball team that played three seasons in the bj league. They were based in Miyazaki, Miyazaki Prefecture.

== Notable players ==
- Marshall Brown (basketball, born 1985)
- Brandon Cole
- Hiroki Fujita
- Ivan Harris
- Abdullahi Kuso
- Dexter Lyons
- Jackie Manuel
- Yuto Otsuka
- Daisuke Takaoka
- Ricky Woods (basketball)

== Coaches ==
- Koto Toyama
- Junichiro Kitago
- Kimitoshi Sano
