= Trinidad and Tobago men's national under-17 basketball team =

Trinidad and Tobago
- FIBA zone: FIBA Americas
- National federation: National Basketball Federation of Trinidad and Tobago

U19 World Cup
- Appearances: None

U18 AmeriCup
- Appearances: None

U17 Centrobasket
- Appearances: 1 (2007)
- Medals: None

The Trinidad and Tobago men's national under-17 basketball team is a national basketball team of Trinidad and Tobago, administered by the National Basketball Federation of Trinidad and Tobago. It represents the country in men's international under-17 basketball competitions.

In 2005, the team also participated at the former CBC U18 Championship, where they finished in 4th place.

== FIBA U17 Centrobasket ==
So far, Trinidad and Tobago's only participation at the FIBA U17 Centrobasket was in 2007, where they finished in 6th place.

== See also ==
- Trinidad and Tobago national basketball team
- Trinidad and Tobago women's national under-17 basketball team
