= Yuto Otsuka =

Japanese basketball player

Yuto Otsuka 大塚裕土
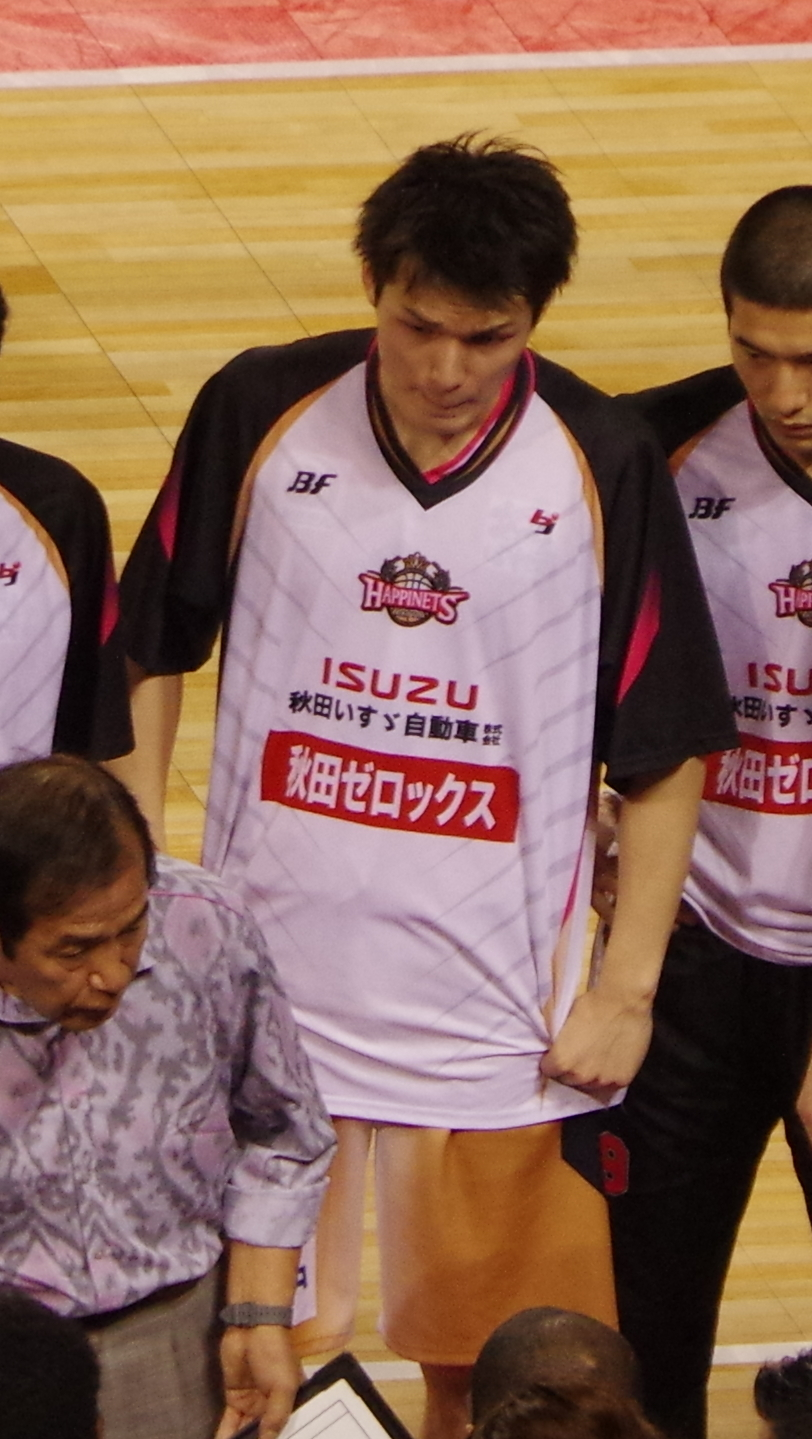
- Otsuka with Akita Happinets

Retired
- Position: Forward
- League: B.League

Personal information
- Born: August 23, 1987 (age 39) Nayoro, Hokkaido, Japan
- Listed height: 6 ft 2 in (1.88 m)
- Listed weight: 181 lb (82 kg)

Career information
- High school: Tokai University No. 4 (Sapporo, Hokkaido)
- College: Tokai University (2006–2010)
- Playing career: 2010–present

Career history
- 2010–2012: TGI D-Rise
- 2013–2013: Miyazaki Shining Suns
- 2013–2016: Akita Northern Happinets
- 2016–2017: Hitachi SunRockers Tokyo-Shibuya
- 2017–2019: Toyama Grouses
- 2019-2021: Kawasaki Brave Thunders
- 2021-2026: Altiri Chiba

Career highlights
- 2× B.League All-Star (2018, 2019); B.League All-Star game MVP (2019)

Yuto Otsuka (大塚 裕土, Ōtsuka Yūto; born August 23, 1987) is a Japanese professional basketball player for the Altiri Chiba of the B.League in Japan. He was selected by the Miyazaki Shining Suns with the third overall pick in the 2012 bj League draft. His nicknames are "Prince" in Akita and "Come on" in Toyama.

== Career statistics ==
Legend
GP	Games played	GS	Games started	MPG	Minutes per game
FG%	Field goal percentage	3P%	3-point field goal percentage	FT%	Free throw percentage
RPG	Rebounds per game	APG	Assists per game	SPG	Steals per game
BPG	Blocks per game	PPG	Points per game	**Bold**	Career high

=== Regular season ===
Year	Team	GP	GS	MPG	FG%	3P%	FT%	RPG	APG	SPG	BPG	PPG
2011-12	TGI	27	19	27	40.3%	38.5%	81.8%	2.7	0.5	0.6	0.4	9.4
2012-13	Miyazaki	50	47	33	35.6%	33.7%	71.0%	1.0	1.4	0.7	0.1	12.6
2013-14	Akita	52	51	26.1	38.9%	36.1%	75.8%	1.4	0.7	0.4	0.1	8.2
2014-15	Akita	52	51	26.4	39.4%	36.9%	68.8%	1.7	1.6	0.7	0.1	8.8
2015-16	Akita	52	52	32.0	38.8%	40.8%	75.0%	2.4	2.8	0.7	0.2	9.7
2016-17	Shibuya	52	5	10.9	37.2%	37.1%	50.0%	0.5	0.2	0.2	0.0	3.3
2017-18	Toyama	60	59	30.8	41.0%	39.7%	80.0%	1.5	1.5	0.5	0.2	9.3
2018-19	Toyama	58	58	25.4	41.7%	37.8%	85.0%	1.6	0.9	0.4	0.1	9.2
2019-20	Kawasaki	38	10	16.7	38.8%	35.6%	70.8%	0.8	0.8	0.5	0.0	5.5

=== All-star games ===
Year	Team	GP	GS	MPG	FG%	3P%	FT%	RPG	APG	SPG	BPG	PPG
2019	B.White	1	1	22.12	.416	.462	.000	2.0	4.0	2.0	0	24.0

=== Playoffs ===
Year	Team	GP	GS	MPG	FG%	3P%	FT%	RPG	APG	SPG	BPG	PPG
2013-14	Akita	6	6	24.33	.259	.375	.500	1.0	1.0	0.17	0	3.16
2016-17	Shibuya	2	0	15.43	.500	.000	.000	0.8	0	0	0	3.0
2017-18	Toyama	4	4	24.49	.382	.214	.600	0.8	0.5	0.5	0	8.0
2017-18	Toyama	1	1	33.43	.444	.429	.600	3.0	2.0	0	1.0	14.0
2018-19	Toyama	2	2	28.20	.412	.333	1.000	1.0	0	0	0	9.5

=== Early cup games ===
Year	Team	GP	GS	MPG	FG%	3P%	FT%	RPG	APG	SPG	BPG	PPG
2017	Toyama	3	3	28:02	.360	.278	.833	1.0	0.3	0.33	0	9.3
2018	Toyama	2	2	24:02	.550	.500	1.000	0.5	1.0	0	0	15.5
2019	Kawasaki	2	1	20:56	.278	.250	.000	1.0	1.0	0	0	6.5
