= Koto Toyama =

Japanese basketball coach

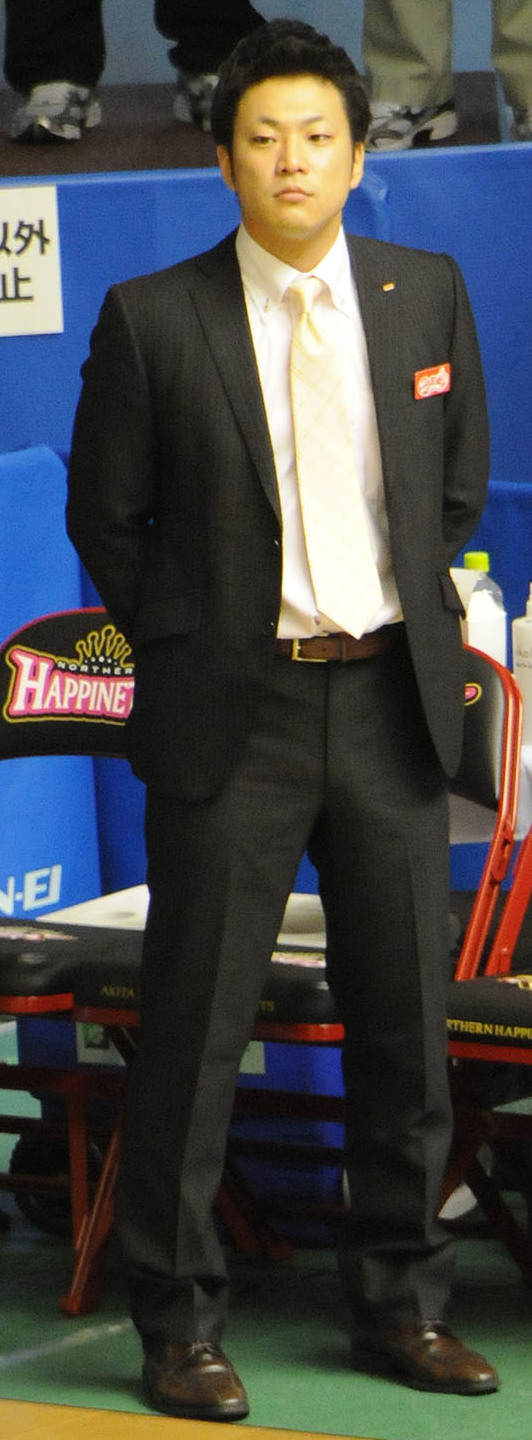
- Image of Koto Toyama

Ryukyu Golden Kings
- Position: Assistant coach
- League: B.League

Personal information
- Born: January 19, 1983 (age 43) Asahikawa, Hokkaido

Career information
- High school: Asahikawa Technical (Asahikawa, Hokkaido)
- College: Sapporo University

Career history

Coaching
- 2008-2010: Hamamatsu Higashimikawa Phoenix (asst)
- 2010-2012: Miyazaki Shining Suns
- 2012-2013: Ryukyu Golden Kings
- 2013-2014: Bambitious Nara
- 2014-2017: Shiga Lakestars
- 2017-2020: Nagoya Diamond Dolphins (associate)
- 2020-present: Ryukyu Golden Kings (asst)

Career highlights

Koto Toyama (遠山向人, Toyama Koto) is the assistant coach of the Ryukyu Golden Kings in the Japanese B.League.

== Head coaching record ==
Legend
Regular season	G	Games coached	W	Games won	L	Games lost	W–L %	Win–loss %
Playoffs	PG	Playoff games	PW	Playoff wins	PL	Playoff losses	PW–L %	Playoff win–loss %

Team	Year	G	W	L	W–L%	Finish	PG	PW	PL	PW–L%	Result
Miyazaki Shining Suns	2010-11	50	13	37	.260	8th in Western	-	-	-	–	-
Miyazaki Shining Suns	2011-12	52	22	30	.423	8th in Western	-	-	-	–	-
Ryukyu Golden Kings	2012-13	52	42	10	.808	1st in Western	3	1	2	.333	Lost in 2nd round
Bambitious Nara	2013-14	52	19	33	.365	9th in Western	-	-	-	–	-
Shiga Lakestars	2014-15	52	34	18	.654	4th in Western	7	5	2	.714	3rd place
Shiga Lakestars	2015-16	52	35	17	.673	5th in Western	4	2	2	.500	Lost in 2nd round
Shiga Lakestars	2016-17	60	21	39	.350	6th in Western	-	-	-	–	-
