= Ivan Harris =

American basketball player

No. 3 – Melton Thoroughbreds
- Position: Power forward
- League: Big V D1

Personal information
- Born: March 17, 1984 (age 42) Springfield, Ohio
- Listed height: 6 ft 7 in (2.01 m)
- Listed weight: 220 lb (100 kg)

Career information
- High school: Oak Hill Academy (Mouth of Wilson, Virginia)
- College: Ohio State (2003–2007)
- NBA draft: 2007: undrafted
- Playing career: 2007–present

Career history
- 2007–2008: Lappeenrannan NMKY
- 2008–2010: Erie BayHawks
- 2010: Gimnasia CR
- 2010: Atletico Biguá
- 2011: Ballarat Miners
- 2011: Miyazaki Shining Suns
- 2013: NBA D-League Select (Summer League)
- 2013: Halifax Rainmen
- 2015–present: Melton Thoroughbreds

Career highlights
- Big V D1 champion (2015); Big V D1 Grand Final MVP (2015); Finnish Cup champion (2008); McDonald's All-American (2003); Fourth-team Parade All-American (2003)

Ivan Troy Harris (born March 17, 1984) is an American professional basketball player who currently plays for the Melton Thoroughbreds of the Big V Division One. He played college basketball for Ohio State University before playing professionally in for the NBA Development League as well as playing in Finland, Australia, Argentina, Uruguay, Japan, Romania and Canada.

== College career ==
Harris, a 6'7" forward from Springfield, Ohio, attended Oak Hill Academy before playing four years of college basketball for Ohio State. During his senior year, the Buckeyes were the runners-up in the 2007 NCAA Tournament. In 127 career games, he averaged 5.7 points and 2.3 rebounds per game.

== Professional career ==
After going undrafted in the 2007 NBA draft, Harris moved to Finland and signed with Lappeenrannan NMKY for the 2007–08 Korisliiga season. In 30 games for Lappeenrannan, he averaged 12.7 points and 4.1 rebounds per game. He also averaged 12.3 points and 3.4 rebounds in eight Eurocup games.

In October 2008, Harris joined the Erie BayHawks of the NBA Development League. He played two seasons for Erie and averaged 14.0 points and 4.5 rebounds in 99 total games.

In late 2010, Harris had two short-lived stints with Gimnasia CR of Argentina and Atletico Biguá of Uruguay. In February 2011, he signed with the Ballarat Miners for the 2011 SEABL season.

In September 2011, Harris signed with the Miyazaki Shining Suns for the 2011–12 bj league season. He later left Miyazaki in December 2011 after appearing in 21 games.

In January 2013, Harris joined BC Perla Harghitei Miercurea Ciuc of Romania's Liga Națională.

In August 2013, Harris signed with Halifax Rainmen for the 2013–14 NBL Canada season. He left the team in November 2013 after appearing in just five games.

In March 2015, Harris signed with the Melton Thoroughbreds for the 2015 Big V Division One season. He had a great season for the Thoroughbreds, helping his team win the 2015 Big V D1 championship with a 2–0 Grand Final series win over the Latrobe City Energy. He subsequently earned Grand Final MVP honors after scoring 26 points in Game 1, and 19 points in Game 2. He appeared in all 26 games for the Thoroughbreds and averaged 19.4 points, 6.0 rebounds and 1.1 steals per game.

On October 1, 2015, Harris re-signed with the Thoroughbreds on a two-year deal. He is currently with the Thoroughbreds still.
