= Tomohiro Moriyama =

Japanese basketball player and coach

Tomohiro Moriyama 森山 知広
Nishinomiya Storks
- Position: Head coach
- League: B.League

Personal information
- Born: January 23, 1984 (age 42) Kitakyushu, Fukuoka

Career information
- High school: Kyushu Kyoritsu University Yahata Nishi (Kitakyushu, Fukuoka)
- College: Sendai University
- Coaching career: 2013–present

Career history

Playing
- ?–?: Fukuoka BB Boys

Coaching
- 2013–2014: Osaka Evessa (assistant)
- 2014: Shimane Susanoo Magic (assistant)
- 2014–2015: Shimane Susanoo Magic
- 2015–2016: Rizing Fukuoka
- 2016–present: Fukushima Firebonds

Tomohiro Moriyama (森山 知広, Moriyama Tomohiro) is the Head coach of the Fukushima Firebonds in the Japanese B.League.

== Head coaching record ==
Legend
Regular season	G	Games coached	W	Games won	L	Games lost	W–L %	Win–loss %
Playoffs	PG	Playoff games	PW	Playoff wins	PL	Playoff losses	PW–L %	Playoff win–loss %

Team	Year	G	W	L	W–L%	Finish	PG	PW	PL	PW–L%	Result
Shimane Susanoo Magic	2014-15	40	21	19	.525	6th in Bj Western	2	0	2	.000	Lost in 1st round
Rizing Fukuoka	2015-16	38	14	24	.368	Fired	-	-	-	–	-
Fukushima Firebonds	2016-17	60	30	30	.500	3rd in B2 Eastern	-	-	-	–	-
Fukushima Firebonds	2017-18	60	38	22	.633	2nd in B2 Eastern	-	-	-	–	-
Fukushima Firebonds	2018-19	60	27	33	.450	4th in B2 Eastern	-	-	-	–	-
Fukushima Firebonds	2019-20	47	16	31	.340	5th in B2 Eastern	-	-	-	–	-
