= Jeff Newton =

American basketball player (born 1981)

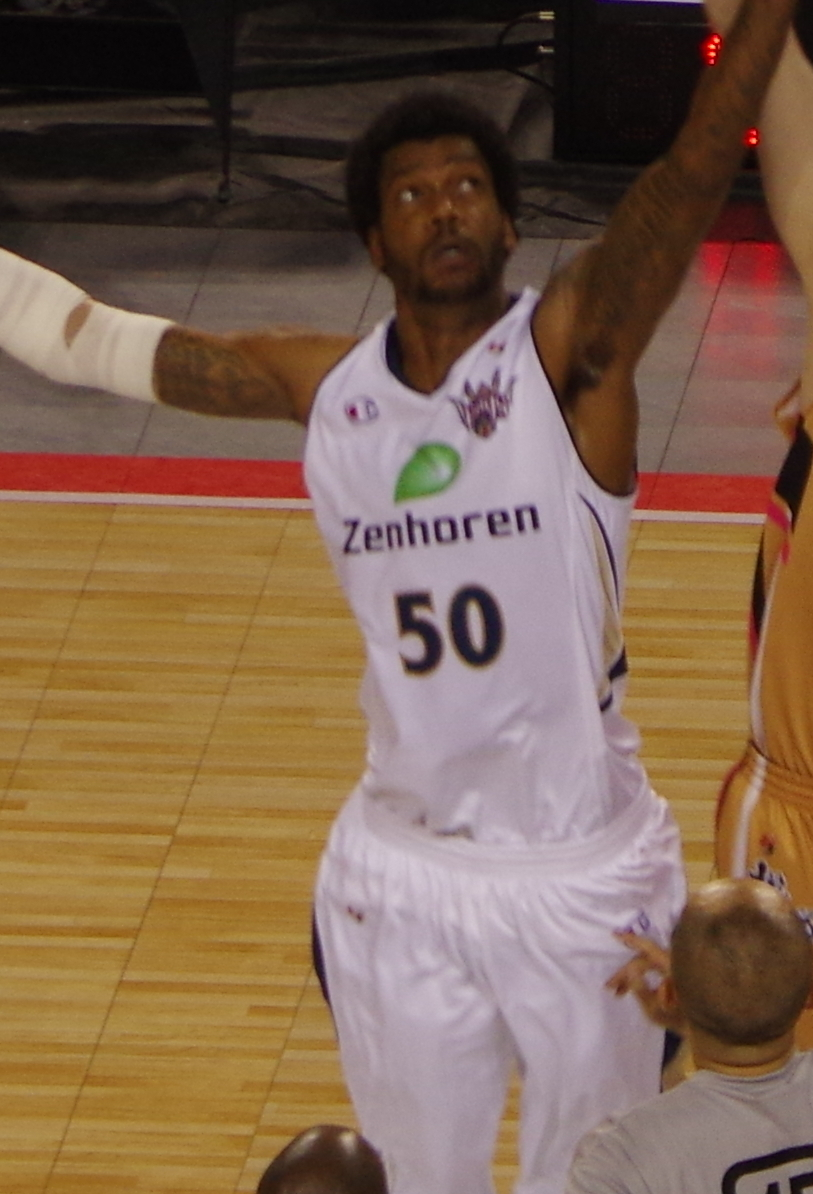
- Newton playing for Ryukyu in 2014

Personal information
- Born: January 4, 1981 (age 45) Atlanta, Georgia, United States
- Listed height: 6 ft 9 in (2.06 m)
- Listed weight: 225 lb (102 kg)

Career information
- High school: Benjamin Elijah Mays (Atlanta, Georgia)
- College: Indiana (1999–2003)
- NBA draft: 2003: undrafted
- Playing career: 2003–2014
- Position: Power forward / center
- Number: 50

Career history
- 2003–2005: CB Ciudad de Huelva
- 2005–2008: Osaka Evessa
- 2008-2014: Ryukyu Golden Kings

Career highlights
- 6x Bj league champions; 3x bj League block shots leaders (2005-08); Bj league best 5 (2009); Bj league MVP (2009); Bj league finals MVP (2009)

Jeffrey Hassan Newton (born January 4, 1981) is an American former professional basketball player. He played college basketball for Indiana University.

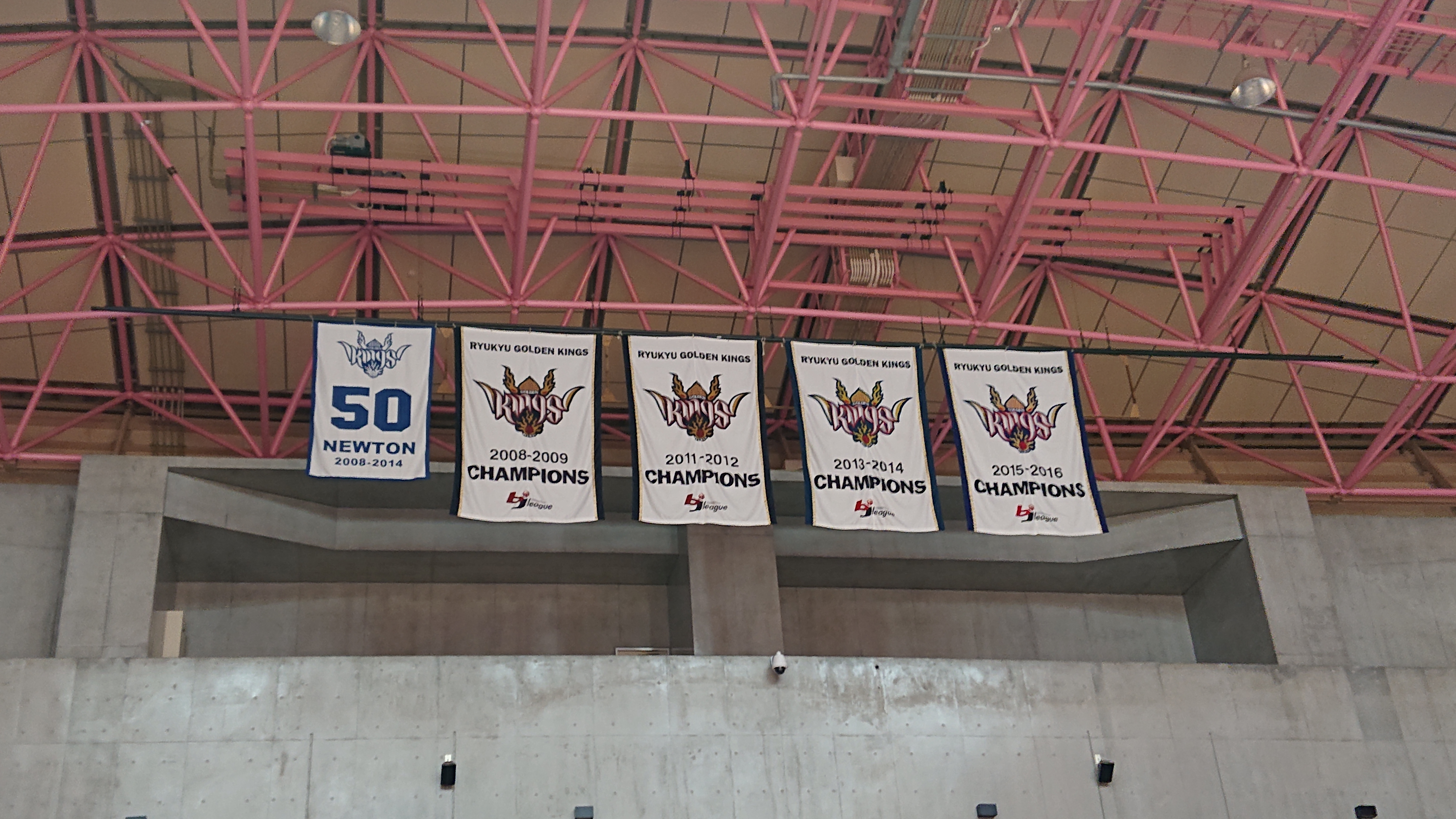
No. 50 retired by Ryukyu

== Career statistics ==
Legend
| GP | Games played | GS | Games started | MPG | Minutes per game |
| FG% | Field goal percentage | 3P% | 3-point field goal percentage | FT% | Free throw percentage |
| RPG | Rebounds per game | APG | Assists per game | SPG | Steals per game |
| BPG | Blocks per game | PPG | Points per game | **Bold** | Career high |

| Year | Team | GP | GS | MPG | FG% | 3P% | FT% | RPG | APG | SPG | BPG | PPG |
|---|---|---|---|---|---|---|---|---|---|---|---|---|
| 2005-06 | Osaka | 38 | 38 | 33.6 | .484 | .216 | .632 | 12.0 | 1.6 | 0.6 | 2.7 | 15.0 |
| 2006-07 | Osaka | 35 | 35 | 36.4 | .512 | .143 | .604 | 13.3 | 2.5 | 1.5 | 2.3 | 15.2 |
| 2007-08 | Osaka | 44 | 44 | 38.4 | .480 | .324 | .688 | 13.3 | 2.8 | 1.6 | 3.4 | 19.0 |
| 2008-09 | Ryukyu | 50 | 50 | 36.9 | .477 | .205 | .696 | 13.1 | 2.3 | 0.9 | 1.6 | 17.9 |
| 2009-10 | Ryukyu | 33 | 32 | 33.2 | .455 | .000 | .545 | 11.5 | 1.9 | 0.5 | 1.5 | 14.9 |
| 2010-11 | Ryukyu | 49 | 48 | 31.5 | .502 | .000 | .618 | 10.8 | 2.3 | 0.7 | 1.3 | 12.4 |
| 2011-12 | Ryukyu | 51 | 51 | 31.2 | .484 | .310 | .708 | 9.9 | 2.1 | 0.9 | 0.9 | 11.3 |
| 2012-13 | Ryukyu | 41 | 36 | 26.4 | .526 | .000 | .618 | 8.8 | 1.4 | 0.9 | 1.2 | 9.1 |
| 2013-14 | Ryukyu | 52 | | 22.0 | .406 | .000 | .656 | 6.4 | 0.9 | 0.5 | 0.6 | 4.2 |
