= Miyazaki Prefectural Gymnasium =

Sports venue in Miyazaki, Japan

Coordinates: 31°55′03.1″N 131°26′05.0″E

Miyazaki Prefectural Gymnasium 宮崎県体育館
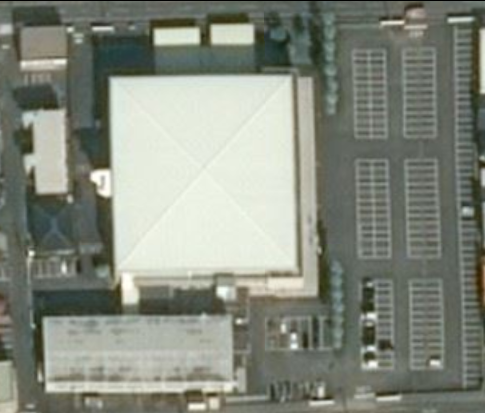
- Interactive map of Miyazaki Prefectural Gymnasium 宮崎県体育館
- Full name: Miyazaki Prefectural Gymnasium
- Location: Miyazaki, Miyazaki, Japan
- Owner: Miyazaki Prefecture
- Operator: Miyazaki Prefectural Sports Facility Association
- Capacity: 4,180

Construction
- Cost

Tenant
- Miyazaki Shining Suns (2010-2013)

Miyazaki Prefectural Gymnasium is an arena in Miyazaki, Miyazaki, Japan. It was the home arena of the Miyazaki Shining Suns of the bj league, Japan's professional basketball league.
