= Brandon Cole =

American professional basketball player

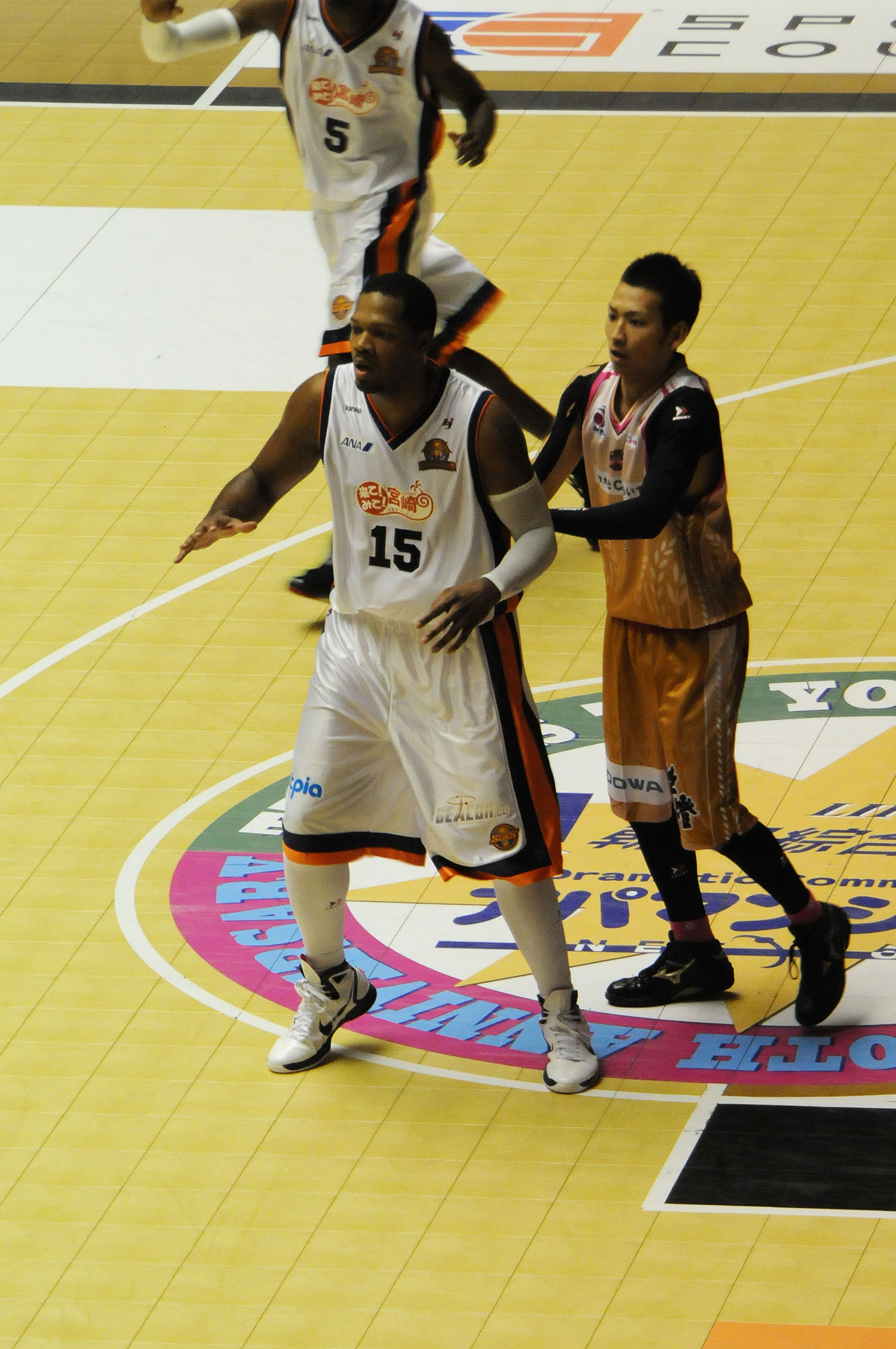

Personal information
- Born: March 13, 1984 (age 42) Chicago Heights, Illinois, U.S.
- Listed height: 6 ft 9 in (2.06 m)

Career information
- High school: Rich South (Richton Park, Illinois)
- College: Xavier (2003–2007)
- Playing career: 2007–2015
- Position: Power forward

Career history
- 2007: Xinjiang Flying Tigers
- 2007–2008: Lobos Grises
- 2008: Gary Steelheads
- 2008–2009: Club Deportes Castro
- 2009: Vermont Frost Heaves
- 2009: CS Energia
- 2009–2010: Plejmejker Cubus
- 2010–2011: Miyazaki Shining Suns
- 2011–2012: Rabotnički
- 2012: Vestelspor Manisa
- 2012–2013: Toyama Grouses
- 2013–2014: Al-Arabi
- 2014: ISSA Town
- 2014–2015: MISR Insurance Club

Brandon Cole (born March 13, 1984) is an American professional basketball player who played college basketball for Xavier.
