= Kimitoshi Sano =

Japanese basketball coach

Fukushima Firebonds
- Position: Head coach
- League: B.League

Personal information
- Born: September 30, 1982 (age 44) Shizuoka Prefecture

Career information
- High school: Shizuoka Gakuen (Shizuoka, Shizuoka)
- College: Kyushu Sangyo University

Career history

Coaching
- 2005-2007: Kyushu Sangyo University (asst.)
- 2007-2010: Kyushu Sangyo University
- 2012-2013: Miyazaki Shining Suns (asst.)
- 2013: Miyazaki Shining Suns
- 2013-2014: Rizing Fukuoka
- 2014: Rizing Fukuoka(asst.)
- 2014-2015: Aomori Wat's(asst.)
- 2015-2022: Fukushima Firebonds(asst.)
- 2022-present: Fukushima Firebonds

Kimitoshi Sano (佐野 公俊, Sano Kimitoshi) is the head coach of the Fukushima Firebonds in the Japanese B.League.

== Head coaching record ==
Legend
Regular season	G	Games coached	W	Games won	L	Games lost	W–L %	Win–loss %
Playoffs	PG	Playoff games	PW	Playoff wins	PL	Playoff losses	PW–L %	Playoff win–loss %

Team	Year	G	W	L	W–L%	Finish	PG	PW	PL	PW–L%	Result
Miyazaki Shining Suns	2013	24	5	19	.208	10th in Western	-	-	-	–	-
Rizing Fukuoka	2013–14	28	11	17	.393	-	-	-	-	–	-
