= Milt Palacio =

Belizean-American basketball player (born 1978)

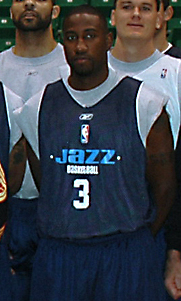
- Palacio with the Utah Jazz in 2005

Personal information
- Born: February 7, 1978 (age 48) Los Angeles, California, U.S.
- Listed height: 6 ft 3 in (1.91 m)
- Listed weight: 210 lb (95 kg)

Career information
- High school: Junípero Serra (Gardena, California)
- College: Midland (1995–1996); Colorado State (1996–1999)
- NBA draft: 1999: undrafted
- Playing career: 1999–2013
- Position: Point guard / shooting guard
- Number: 5, 9, 10, 3
- Coaching career: 2016–present

Career history

Playing
- 1999–2000: Vancouver Grizzlies
- 2000–2002: Boston Celtics
- 2002: Phoenix Suns
- 2002–2003: Cleveland Cavaliers
- 2003–2005: Toronto Raptors
- 2005–2006: Utah Jazz
- 2007–2008: Partizan
- 2008–2009: Khimki
- 2009: Partizan
- 2010: Kavala
- 2010: Caja Laboral
- 2010–2011: Kavala
- 2011: Caja Laboral
- 2011–2012: Blu:sens Monbús
- 2012: Piratas de Quebradillas
- 2012: Bnei Herzliya
- 2013: Lietuvos rytas

Coaching
- 2016–2017: Durham United
- 2018–2021: Long Island Nets (assistant)

Career highlights
- ABA League champion (2008); Serbian League champion (2008); Spanish League champion (2010); Serbian Cup winner (2008); First-team All-WAC (1999)
- Stats at NBA.com
- Stats at Basketball Reference

Milton Sigmund Palacio (born February 7, 1978) is a Belizean-American professional basketball coach and former player.

== Early life ==
Palacio was born and raised in Los Angeles, California, by Belizean parents.

== College career ==
Palacio attended Junípero Serra High School in Gardena, California. He played college basketball at Midland College and Colorado State University, going undrafted in 1999. In his three years with the Rams, Palacio averaged 12.1 points, 4.8 assists and 4.2 rebounds per game.

In 2023, Palacio was inducted into the Colorado State Athletics Hall of Fame.

== Professional career ==
In a seven-year NBA career, from 1999 to 2006, Palacio played for the Vancouver Grizzlies, Boston Celtics, Phoenix Suns, Cleveland Cavaliers, Toronto Raptors and Utah Jazz, with a career scoring average of 4.8 points per game.

His most notable achievement was scoring a buzzer beater for the Celtics in their shocking victory over the New Jersey Nets on December 28, 2000. With the Nets leading 111–109 and inbounding the ball with less than 2 seconds remaining, Palacio stole a pass from Lucious Harris and threw up an off-balance shot with one hand from 30 feet away. Improbably, the shot was made, giving the Celtics a 112–111 victory. Basketball writers dubbed Palacio with the nickname "Miracle Milt", as a recognition of this incredible incident.

Despite a solid season with the Jazz, Palacio was a free agent at the start of the 2006–07 preseason. He eventually caught on with the Seattle SuperSonics, but was waived before the regular season start, unable to unseat Mike Wilks as the third-string point guard behind Luke Ridnour and Earl Watson.

In the 2007–08 season, Palacio began an overseas adventure, signing for ex-European champions Partizan in Serbia. While struggling mightily at times to begin the year, he learned the European game quickly, playing some great basketball in the second half of the season and being named Euroleague's MVP for the month of March 2008, helping Partizan reach the last 8 of the competition for the first time in 10 years. In this season Palacio won triple crown with Partizan, winning the Basketball League of Serbia, Serbian Cup and ABA League.

During the 2008 summer transfer window, Palacio moved to the Russian team Khimki. After a year there, in September 2009, he rejoined Partizan, but was released from his contract few weeks later, after he had not joined the team on time. On January 5, 2010, Palacio signed a contract with the Greek League team Kavala. In 16 games for Kavala, Palacio averaged 10.3 points, 2.6 assists and 2.6 rebounds per game, which has helped the club avoid relegation.

On May 4, 2010, Palacio moved to Spain and signed with Caja Laboral by the end of the 2009–10 season. He helped the Basque team to win the national title for the third time in the club history, beating Barcelona 3–0 in the final series. He then returned to Kavala in August 2010, signing a one-year contract. He averaged 15.7 points, 3.8 assists and 1.3 steals during the regular season, and thus led the team to the playoffs. After the team was eliminated by PAOK, Palacio again moved to Caja Laboral until the end of the 2010–11 season.

In August 2011, Palacio signed a one-year deal with Blu:sens Monbús, where he averaged 6.4 points and 2.4 assists in the 2011–12 season. During the summer of 2012, Palacio played for Piratas de Quebradillas in Puerto Rico. He started the 2012–13 season with Bnei HaSharon in Israel, but finished with Lietuvos rytas in Lithuania.

== Coaching career ==
In 2013, Palacio joined Don Verlin's staff at the University of Idaho as director of player development.

On September 20, 2019, Palacio was rehired as an assistant coach by the Long Island Nets, the NBA Development League affiliate of the Brooklyn Nets after a successful 2018–2019 season.

On August 2, 2021, Palacio was hired as an assistant coach by the Portland Trail Blazers of the National Basketball Association (NBA). On October 7, 2021, Palacio was placed on administrative leave when he was indicted with a group of former NBA players who had allegedly committed insurance fraud.

== National team career ==
In his first international tournament, Palacio led Belize to a gold medal at the 1998 CARICOM Basketball Championship, which the country hosted.

Palacio was also a member of the team that won a silver medal at the 2009 FIBA COCABA Championship, held in Cancún, Mexico, losing in the finals of the hosts 106–103.

== Career statistics ==
Legend
GP	Games played	GS	Games started	MPG	Minutes per game
FG%	Field goal percentage	3P%	3-point field goal percentage	FT%	Free throw percentage
RPG	Rebounds per game	APG	Assists per game	SPG	Steals per game
BPG	Blocks per game	PPG	Points per game	**Bold**	Career high

=== NBA ===
==== Regular season ====
Year	Team	GP	GS	MPG	FG%	3P%	FT%	RPG	APG	SPG	BPG	PPG
1999–00	Vancouver	53	0	7.4	.439	.000	.595	1.0	.9	.4	.0	2.0
2000–01	Boston	58	6	19.7	**.472**	.333	**.848**	1.8	2.6	.8	.0	5.9
2001–02	Boston	41	0	12.6	.385	**.353**	.706	1.2	1.3	.5	.1	3.7
2001–02	Phoenix	28	1	9.7	.380	.143	.783	.8	1.0	.3	.0	2.8
2002–03	Cleveland	**80**	**46**	**24.7**	.418	.216	.747	**2.9**	3.2	**.9**	**.2**	5.0
2003–04	Toronto	59	13	20.5	.349	.154	.662	1.7	3.1	.7	**.2**	4.4
2004–05	Toronto	**80**	4	19.2	.446	.167	.742	1.7	**3.5**	.6	**.2**	5.8
2005–06	Utah	71	18	19.4	.424	.063	.653	1.9	2.7	.7	**.2**	**6.2**
Career		470	88	17.9	.419	.235	.719	1.8	2.5	.6	.1	4.8

=== EuroLeague ===
Year	Team	GP	GS	MPG	FG%	3P%	FT%	RPG	APG	SPG	BPG	PPG	PIR
2007–08	Partizan	23	23	29.5	.381	.269	.779	2.7	3.3	1.3	0.1	12.5	10.5
Career		23	23	29.5	.381	.269	.779	2.7	3.3	1.3	0.1	12.5	10.5

== See also ==
- List of foreign basketball players in Serbia
