= Toros de Aragua =

Venezuelan professional basketball club

Toros de Aragua is a Venezuelan professional basketball club based in Aragua. The club competes in the Liga Profesional de Baloncesto (LPB).

The team took a one-year absence during the 2026 season.

== Notable former players ==
- Set a club record or won an individual award as a professional player.
- Played at least one official international match for his senior national team at any time.

- (Trinidad and Tobago) Kibwe Trim
