= Kimitoshi Nōgawa =

Japanese footballer

Personal information
- Full name: Kimitoshi Nōgawa
- Date of birth: 6 February 1984 (age 42)
- Place of birth: Wakayama, Wakayama Prefecture, Japan
- Height: 1.82 m (5 ft 11 1/2 in)
- Position: Striker

Youth career
- 1996: Yura FC
- 1997: Craz Osaka
- 1998: Yura FC
- 1999–2001: Shonan Gakuen
- 2002: Shizuoka Sangyo University

Senior career*
Years	Team	Apps	(Gls)
2003	Londrina Esporte Clube		
2004–2005	Górnik Zabrze	3	(0)
2005–2006	FCM Târgoviște	2	(0)
2007	Canon Yaoundé	0	(0)

International career
- Japan U17
- * Club domestic league appearances and goals

Kimitoshi Nōgawa (直川 公俊, Nōgawa Kimitoshi; born 6 February 1984) is a Japanese former professional footballer who played as a striker. His birthday has also been reported as 27 June 1978.

== Career ==
After completing the 2002 season at Shizuoka Sangyo University, he moved to Brazil where he played for Londrina EC during the 2003 season.

At the start of 2004 he joined Górnik Zabrze in Poland's top division and was reported to be the first Japanese player to play in Poland. During the 2005–06 season he played for FC Municipal Târgovişte in Romania. He is also reported to have tried his luck in Italy.

On April 12, 2005 it was reported that Nougawa had apparently signed with Canon Yaoundé in Cameroon on a one-year contract and that he would be the first Japanese player to play in Africa. Nogawa, it was reported, moved to Cameroon because of the "country's football reputation" and because he admired Patrick Mboma, who played in Japan. Komodo Sport, a sports management company based in Indonesia and owned by Maboang Kessack, who played for Cameroon at the 1990 World Cup, was reported as being behind this deal.

However, as it turned out, no contract had been signed and after five days in Yaoundé the player left, despite earlier promising to win the national championship with the club.

== International career ==
He represented Japan at the U17 level.
