= 2010 Centrobasket =

2010 FIBA Centrobasket
22nd Central American and Caribbean Basketball Championship

Tournament details
- Host country: Dominican Republic
- Dates: July 5 – July 12
- Teams: 10
- Venue(s): 1 (in 1 host city)

Final positions
- Champions: Puerto Rico (10th title)

Tournament statistics
- MVP: (Puerto Rico) Carlos Arroyo

Official website
- Centrobasket 2010

The 2010 Men's Central American and Caribbean Basketball Championship, also known as 2010 Centrobasket, was hosted in the Dominican Republic. This edition was the first time that the Centrobasket featured ten teams in the finals; previously, eight teams had qualified. Puerto Rico won the title with an 89-80 victory over Dominican Republic. Panama captured the bronze medal with a 75-74 victory over Cuba. All four teams qualified for the FIBA Americas Championship 2011. Jamaica finished 5th for their best ever performance at the tournament while Belize finished 7th to match their best performance. The British Virgin Islands finished 8th after qualifying for Centrobasket for the first time in their history.

== First round ==
=== Group A ===
Team	Pld	W	L	PF	PA	PD	Pts	Tie-Break
Dominican Republic	4	4	0	314	253	+61	8	
Panama	4	2	2	260	257	+3	6	+4
Jamaica	4	2	2	255	244	+11	6	–4
British Virgin Islands	4	1	3	223	281	–58	5	+9
Virgin Islands	4	1	3	285	302	–17	5	–9

July 5
15:30

Game 2

British Virgin Islands	59–50	Virgin Islands
Scoring by quarter: 14–14, 15–10, 20–12, 10–14
Pts: Halstead Chiverton 23; Rebs: Steve Parillon 11; Asts: 3 tied with 3		Pts: Walter Hodge 16; Rebs: Frank Elegar 12; Asts: Hodge and Kashif Gumbs 3

Palacio de los Deportes Virgilio Travieso Soto, Santo Domingo

July 5
20:30

Game 4

Dominican Republic	63–56	Panama
Scoring by quarter: 13–16, 12–18, 13–9, 25–13
Pts: Kelvin Peña 18; Rebs: Franklin Western 7 Asts: Jack Michael Martinez 4		Pts: Danilo Pinnock 21; Rebs: Gyno Pomare 13; Asts: Jaime Lloreda 5

Palacio de los Deportes Virgilio Travieso Soto, Santo Domingo

July 6
15:30

Game 6

Panama	75–61	British Virgin Islands
Scoring by quarter: 27–18, 16–19, 12–10, 20–14
Pts: Jaime Lloreda and Danilo Pinnock 13; Rebs: Gyno Pomare 10; Asts: Joel Munoz 6		Pts: Kennedy Bass and Halstead Chiverton 17; Rebs: Steve Parillon 9 Asts: Kennedy Bass 3

Palacio de los Deportes Virgilio Travieso Soto, Santo Domingo

July 6
20:30

Game 8

Jamaica	62–68	Dominican Republic
Scoring by quarter: 17–21, 22–11, 11–15, 12–21
Pts: Roy Hibbert 19; Rebs: Garfield Blair 9 Asts: Akeem Scott 4		Pts: Charlie Villanueva 13; Rebs: Jack Michael Martinez 13; Asts: Kelvin Peña 5

Palacio de los Deportes Virgilio Travieso Soto, Santo Domingo

July 7
13:00

Game 9

Virgin Islands	82–74	Panama
Scoring by quarter: 16–15, 29–11, 18–21, 19–27
Pts: Walter Hodge 22; Rebs: Frank Elegar 10; Asts: Walter Hodge 6		Pts: Danilo Pinnock 20; Rebs: Jaime Lloreda 10; Asts: Joel Munoz 3

Palacio de los Deportes Virgilio Travieso Soto, Santo Domingo

July 8
15:30

Game 10

British Virgin Islands	56–71	Jamaica
Scoring by quarter: 9–13, 9–17, 18–17, 20–24
Pts: Halstead Chiverton 27; Rebs: Randy George and Kleon Penn 10; Asts: Kennedy Bass 3		Pts: Akeem Scott 18; Rebs: Kimani Ffriend 10; Asts: Garfield Blair 4

Palacio de los Deportes Virgilio Travieso Soto, Santo Domingo

July 9
13:00

Game 13

Jamaica	71–65	Virgin Islands
Scoring by quarter: 20–13, 18–10, 12–13, 21–29
Pts: Garfield Blair 27; Rebs: Kimani Ffriend 12; Asts: Andre Smith 3		Pts: Walter Hodge 19; Rebs: Jason Edwin 10; Asts: Jason Edwin 4

Palacio de los Deportes Virgilio Travieso Soto, Santo Domingo

July 9
20:30

Game 16

Dominican Republic	85–47	British Virgin Islands
Scoring by quarter: 23–9, 19–11, 21–14, 22–13
Pts: Charlie Villanueva 28; Rebs: Jack Michael Martinez 11; Asts: 2 tied with 4		Pts: Trevon Lewis 11; Rebs: Kleon Penn 11; Asts: Steve Parillon 2

Palacio de los Deportes Virgilio Travieso Soto, Santo Domingo

July 10
13:00

Game 17

Panama	55–51	Jamaica
Scoring by quarter: 10–12, 10–12, 19–14, 16–13
Pts: Danilo Pinnock 19; Rebs: Jaime Lloreda 12; Asts: Joel Munoz 4		Pts: Kimani Ffriend 14; Rebs: Kimani Ffriend 7 Asts: 4 tied with 1

Palacio de los Deportes Virgilio Travieso Soto, Santo Domingo

July 10
20:30

Game 20

Virgin Islands	88–98	Dominican Republic
Scoring by quarter: 20–21, 23–21, 18–18, 27–38
Pts: Walter Hodge 26; Rebs: Frank Elegar 11; Asts: Walter Hodge 6		Pts: Elpidio Fortuna and Jack Michael Martinez 21; Rebs: Charlie Villanueva 13; Asts: Ronald Ramon 5

Palacio de los Deportes Virgilio Travieso Soto, Santo Domingo

=== Group B ===
Team	Pld	W	L	PF	PA	PD	Pts	Tie-Break
Puerto Rico	4	3	1	355	318	+37	7	
Cuba	4	2	2	301	289	+12	6	+4
Mexico	4	2	2	304	292	+12	6	+2
Belize	4	2	2	223	281	–58	6	–6
Trinidad and Tobago	4	1	3	280	336	–56	5	

July 5
13:00

Game 1

Trinidad and Tobago	71–80	Belize
Scoring by quarter: 17–14, 21–26, 16–23, 17–17
Pts: Ian Young 15; Rebs: Julius Ashby 11; Asts: Sheldon Christian 5		Pts: Milt Palacio and Alex Carcamo 16; Rebs: Richard Troyer 9 Asts: Milt Palacio 5

Palacio de los Deportes Virgilio Travieso Soto, Santo Domingo

July 5
18:00

Game 3

Mexico	62–82	Cuba
Scoring by quarter: 15–29, 16–25, 18–14, 13–14
Pts: Gustavo Ayon 16; Rebs: Michael Strobbe 9 Asts: 4 tied with 2		Pts: Allens Jemmott 22; Rebs: Yordanis Jaca 10; Asts: 2 tied with 4

Palacio de los Deportes Virgilio Travieso Soto, Santo Domingo

July 6
13:00

Game 5

Belize	63–85	Mexico
Scoring by quarter: 15–12, 17–21, 12–27, 19–25
Pts: Milt Palacio 15; Rebs: Charles Burgess 7 Asts: 3 tied with 2		Pts: Omar Quintero and Jovan Harris 19; Rebs: Gustavo Ayon 12; Asts: Jovan Harris 7

Palacio de los Deportes Virgilio Travieso Soto, Santo Domingo

July 6
18:00

Game 7

Puerto Rico	91–97 (OT)	Trinidad and Tobago
Scoring by quarter: 25–21, 25–15, 23–27, 11–21, Overtime: 7–13
Pts: Carlos Arroyo 24; Rebs: Renaldo Balkman and Peter John Ramos 9 Asts: Carlos Arroyo 9		Pts: Steven Lewis 24; Rebs: Wilfred Benjamin 11; Asts: Ian Young 5

Palacio de los Deportes Virgilio Travieso Soto, Santo Domingo

July 8
18:00

Game 11

Cuba	78–94	Belize
Scoring by quarter: 21–18, 15–27, 18–21, 24–28
Pts: Orestes Torres 18; Rebs: Orestes Torres 7 Asts: Juan Pinerio 7		Pts: Alex Carcamo 23; Rebs: Alex Carcamo and Richard Troyer 10; Asts: Milt Palacio 12

Palacio de los Deportes Virgilio Travieso Soto, Santo Domingo

July 8
20:30

Game 12

Mexico	82–95	Puerto Rico
Scoring by quarter: 18–27, 17–23, 22–27, 25–18
Pts: Jovan Harris 22; Rebs: Michael Strobbe 9 Asts: Jovan Harris 3		Pts: Peter John Ramos 16; Rebs: Renaldo Balkman 10; Asts: Jose Juan Barea 12

Palacio de los Deportes Virgilio Travieso Soto, Santo Domingo

July 9
15:30

Game 14

Trinidad and Tobago	52–75	Mexico
Scoring by quarter: 12–15, 14–17, 13–16, 13–17
Pts: Maurice Joseph and Wilfred Benjamin 10; Rebs: Kibwe Trim 9 Asts: Ian Young 3		Pts: Victor Mariscal 21; Rebs: Gustavo Ayon 11; Asts: Jovan Harris 4

Palacio de los Deportes Virgilio Travieso Soto, Santo Domingo

July 9
18:00

Game 15

Puerto Rico	73–51	Cuba
Scoring by quarter: 20–16, 12–9, 20–14, 21–12
Pts: Carlos Arroyo 16; Rebs: Renaldo Balkman 14; Asts: Jose Juan Barea 9		Pts: Yordanis Jaca and Yoan Luis 9 Rebs: Yoan Luis and Orestes Torres 9 Asts: Juan Pinerio 3

Palacio de los Deportes Virgilio Travieso Soto, Santo Domingo

July 10
15:30

Game 18

Cuba	90–60	Trinidad and Tobago
Scoring by quarter: 27–11, 25–20, 20–18, 18–11
Pts: Allens Jemmott 24; Rebs: Yoan Luis 9 Asts: Juan Pineiro 6		Pts: Ian Young 18; Rebs: Kibwe Trim 9 Asts: Kibwe Trim 4

Palacio de los Deportes Virgilio Travieso Soto, Santo Domingo

July 10
18:00

Game 19

Belize	88–96	Puerto Rico
Scoring by quarter: 15–25, 23–20, 22–24, 28–27
Pts: Milt Palacio 24; Rebs: Richard Troyer 11; Asts: Milt Palacio 6		Pts: Peter John Ramos 27; Rebs: Renaldo Balkman 12; Asts: Jose Juan Barea 8

Palacio de los Deportes Virgilio Travieso Soto, Santo Domingo

== Bracket ==
Semi-finals
July 11–17:00
Puerto Rico	77
Panama	70
July 11–19:30
Dominican Republic	85
Cuba	71

Final
July 12–20:30
Puerto Rico	89
Dominican Republic	80
Third place
July 12–18:00
Panama	75
Cuba	74

== Semifinals ==
The top 2 teams from each group advance to the semifinals, in which the top team of Group A plays against the second place team of Group B and the top team of Group B plays against the second place team of Group A.

Three-team ties are determined by the point differential in games played between the three teams, not counting the margin of victory or loss against a non tied team.

July 11
17:00

Game 21

Puerto Rico	77–70	Panama
Scoring by quarter: 23–13, 16–21, 20–23, 18–13
Pts: Carlos Arroyo 23; Rebs: Peter John Ramos 10; Asts: Carlos Arroyo 5		Pts: Jaime Lloreda 20; Rebs: Jaime Lloreda 11; Asts: Joel Munoz 6

Palacio de los Deportes Virgilio Travieso Soto, Santo Domingo

July 11
19:30

Game 22

Dominican Republic	85–71	Cuba
Scoring by quarter: 17–15, 22–22, 29–10, 17–24
Pts: Franklin Western 16; Rebs: Elys Guzman 11; Asts: Kelvin Peña 6		Pts: Yoan Luis 14; Rebs: Orestes Torres 7 Asts: Juan Pinerio 3

Palacio de los Deportes Virgilio Travieso Soto, Santo Domingo

== Third-place game ==
July 12
18:00

Game 23

Cuba	74–75	Panama
Scoring by quarter: 17–23, 19–12, 19–25, 19–15
Pts: Orestes Torres 16; Rebs: Orestes Torres 7 Asts: Orestes Torres 6		Pts: Jaime Lloreda 24; Rebs: Jaime Lloreda 12; Asts: Danilo Pinnock 5

Palacio de los Deportes Virgilio Travieso Soto, Santo Domingo

== Final ==
July 12
20:30

Game 24

Dominican Republic	80–89	Puerto Rico
Scoring by quarter: 23–19, 24–20, 17–24, 16–26
Pts: Charlie Villanueva 36; Rebs: Charlie Villanueva 11; Asts: Christian Aries 6		Pts: Carlos Arroyo 23; Rebs: Renaldo Balkman 8 Asts: Filiberto Rivera 6

Palacio de los Deportes Virgilio Travieso Soto, Santo Domingo

== Final standings ==
Qualified for 2011 FIBA Americas Championship

Rank	Team	Record
1st place, gold medalist(s)	Puerto Rico	5–1
2nd place, silver medalist(s)	Dominican Republic	5–1
3rd place, bronze medalist(s)	Panama	3–3
4	Cuba	2–4
5	Jamaica	2–2
6	Mexico	2–2
7	Belize	2–2
8	British Virgin Islands	1–3
9	Virgin Islands	1–3
10	Trinidad and Tobago	1–3
