= Reginald Warren =

American basketball player (born 1981)

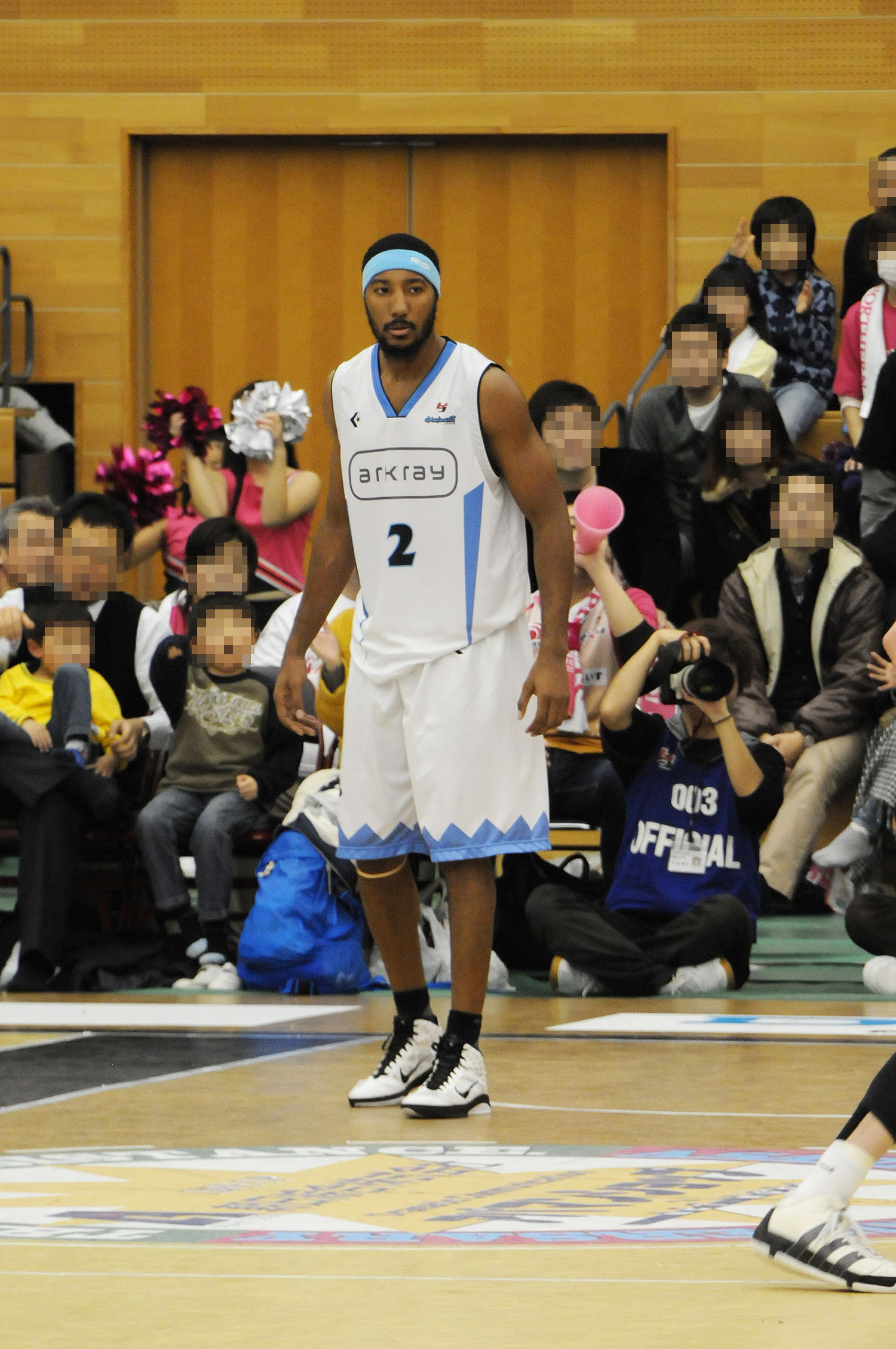
- Warren at Noshiro City General Gymnasium

Free agent
- Position: Power forward

Personal information
- Born: February 8, 1981 (age 45) Pensacola, Florida, U.S.
- Listed height: 6 ft 9 in (2.06 m)
- Listed weight: 229 lb (104 kg)

Career information
- High school: J. M. Tate (Cantonment, Florida)
- College: Spring Hill (2000–2002); West Florida (2002–2004)
- NBA draft: 2004: undrafted
- Playing career: 2004–present

Career history
- 2004–xxxx: Marinos B.B.C.
- 2005–2005: Niagara Daredevils
- xxxx–xxxx: Yarcha
- xxxx–xxxx: Maccabi Petah Tikva B.C.
- xxxx–xxxx: İstanbul Teknik Üniversitesi B.K.
- 2006–2008: Takamatsu Five Arrows
- 2008–2009: Saitama Broncos
- 2009–2010: Changwon LG Sakers
- 2010–2011: Kyoto Hannaryz
- 2011–2012: Guaiqueríes de Margarita
- 2012–2014: Rizing Fukuoka
- 2014–2015: Kyoto Hannaryz
- 2015–2016: Hamamatsu Higashimikawa Phoenix
- 2016–2017: Kumamoto Volters
- 2017–2019: Kagawa Five Arrows
- 2019–2020: Veltex Shizuoka

Career highlights
- 3× bj League Best Five; 3× bj League All-star; B2 Rebound leader (2018)

Reginald Warren (born February 8, 1981) is an American professional basketball player for Veltex Shizuoka in Japan.

== Career statistics ==
Legend
GP	Games played	GS	Games started	MPG	Minutes per game
FG%	Field goal percentage	3P%	3-point field goal percentage	FT%	Free throw percentage
RPG	Rebounds per game	APG	Assists per game	SPG	Steals per game
BPG	Blocks per game	PPG	Points per game	**Bold**	Career high

*	Led the league

Year	Team	GP	GS	MPG	FG%	3P%	FT%	RPG	APG	SPG	BPG	PPG
2006–07	Takamatsu	37	20	29.4	.510	.282	.564	9.0	2.5	1.2	.5	14.0
2007–08	Takamatsu	42	42	37.6	.491	.252	.594	12.4	3.1	1.4	.9	21.6
2008–09	Saitama	47	47	38.4	.467	.324	.552	12.3	3.5	1.3	1.0	21.9
2010–11	Kyoto	38	26	26.0	.462	.257	.578	10.2	2.5	1.1	.8	13.4
2012–13	Fukuoka	52	51	33.0	.464	.359	.594	12.6	2.4	1.2	.8	16.9
2013–14	Fukuoka	52	52	35.2	.448	.314	.554	11.5	2.9	1.2	.7	16.5
2014–15	Kyoto	48	36	25.2	.422	.245	.569	8.5	2.0	1.3	0.4	13.4
2015–16	Hamamatsu	50	48	32.6	.422	.281	.495	13.6	3.4	1.0	0.6	14.1
2016–17	Kumamoto	53	10	23.9	.442	.295	.627	8.5	1.8	0.8	0.7	13.7
2017–18	Kagawa	60	58	30.9	.456	.304	.618	12.7*	2.9	0.9	0.3	20.9
