= Le'Bryan Nash =

American basketball player (born 1992)

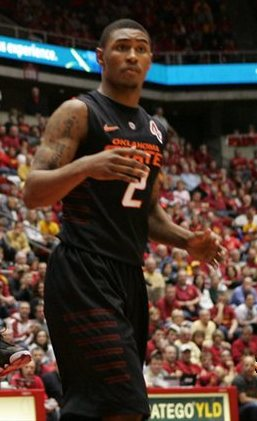
- Nash with Oklahoma State in 2012

Free agent
- Position: Small forward

Personal information
- Born: June 30, 1992 (age 34) Dallas, Texas, U.S.
- Listed height: 6 ft 7 in (2.01 m)
- Listed weight: 225 lb (102 kg)

Career information
- High school: Lincoln (Dallas, Texas)
- College: Oklahoma State (2011–2015)
- NBA draft: 2015: undrafted
- Playing career: 2015–present

Career history
- 2015–2016: Fukushima Firebonds
- 2016–2017: Rio Grande Valley Vipers
- 2017–2018: Busan KT Sonicboom
- 2018–2019: Tokyo Hachioji Bee Trains
- 2019–2020: Peñarol
- 2020: Maccabi Haifa
- 2020–2021: Sendai 89ers
- 2022: Cañeros del Este
- 2022: Plateros de Fresnillo
- 2023: Urupan
- 2023: Peñarol
- 2023: Piratas de Los Lagos
- 2023: Búcaros de Bucaramanga
- 2023–2024: RANS Simba Bogor
- 2024–2025: Satria Muda Pertamina

Career highlights
- All-IBL Second Team (2024); bj league All-Star MVP (2016); bj league Best Five (2015–16); Second-team All-Big 12 (2015); Big 12 Freshman of the Year (2012); Second-team Parade All-American (2011); McDonald's All-American (2011); Texas Mr. Basketball (2011)
- Stats at Basketball Reference
Medals
Men's basketball
Representing the United States
FIBA Americas U18 Championship
Gold medal – first place	2010 San Antonio	Team

Le'Bryan Keithdrick Nash (born June 30, 1992) is an American professional basketball player who last played for the Satria Muda Pertamina of the Indonesian Basketball League (IBL). He played college basketball for the Oklahoma State Cowboys.

== High school career ==
Nash attended Lincoln High School. He was rated as the #6 player by Rivals.com, and the #8 player by Scout.com. In the ESPNU 100 basketball rankings, Nash was the 3rd ranked small forward in his class.

College recruiting
Name	Hometown	School	Height	Weight	Commit date
Le'Bryan Nash; SF	Dallas	Lincoln High School	6 ft 7 in (2.01 m)	230 lb (100 kg)	Oct 21, 2010
Le'Bryan Nash; SF	Recruit ratings: Scout: Rivals: 247Sports: ESPN:				

== College career ==
On October 21, 2010, Nash committed and signed to play basketball with Oklahoma State University after visiting the campus on August 20 of the same year. Oklahoma State Cowboys head coach Travis Ford stated that Le'Bryan Nash's arrival to the Cowboys basketball team "makes us better immediately."

=== College statistics ===
Legend
GP	Games played	GS	Games started	MPG	Minutes per game
FG%	Field goal percentage	3P%	3-point field goal percentage	FT%	Free throw percentage
RPG	Rebounds per game	APG	Assists per game	SPG	Steals per game
BPG	Blocks per game	PPG	Points per game	**Bold**	Career high

Year	Team	GP	GS	MPG	FG%	3P%	FT%	RPG	APG	SPG	BPG	PPG
2011–12	Oklahoma State	28	23	25.1	.394	.235	.730	5.0	1.5	0.6	0.4	13.3
2012–13	Oklahoma State	33	32	31.9	.462	.240	.741	4.1	1.8	0.6	0.2	14.0
2013–14	Oklahoma State	34	34	29.9	.520	.000	.739	5.5	1.6	0.5	0.8	13.9
2014–15	Oklahoma State	31	31	31.7	.462	.100	.791	5.7	2.0	0.8	0.9	17.2
Career	Oklahoma State	126	120	30.9	.460	.208	.754	5.1	1.7	0.6	0.6	14.6

== Professional career ==
=== Fukushima Firebonds (2015–2016) ===
After going undrafted in the 2015 NBA draft, Nash signed a one-season contract with the Fukushima Firebonds of the Japanese bj league in September 2015 and made his professional debut in the season-opening match against the Yokohama B-Corsairs on October 3, 2015. On February 28, 2016, he scored 54 points in a game against the Shinshu Brave Warriors, the highest score in the league's 10-year history and passing the previous total of 53 points set by Rizing Fukuoka's Michael Parker in November 2010.

=== Rio Grande Valley Vipers (2016–2017) ===
On October 22, 2016, Nash signed with the Houston Rockets, but was waived two days later. On October 31, 2016, he was acquired by the Rio Grande Valley Vipers of the NBA Development League as an affiliate player of the Rockets. On February 16, 2017, Nash was waived by the Vipers.

=== Busan KT Sonicboom / Houston Rockets (2017–2018) ===
On December 24, 2017, Nash signed with Busan KT Sonicboom of the Korean Basketball League.

On March 23, 2018, Nash signed a 10-day contract with the Houston Rockets. However he was waived on March 31 without playing a game for the Rockets.

=== Tokyo Hachioji Bee Trains (2018–2019) ===
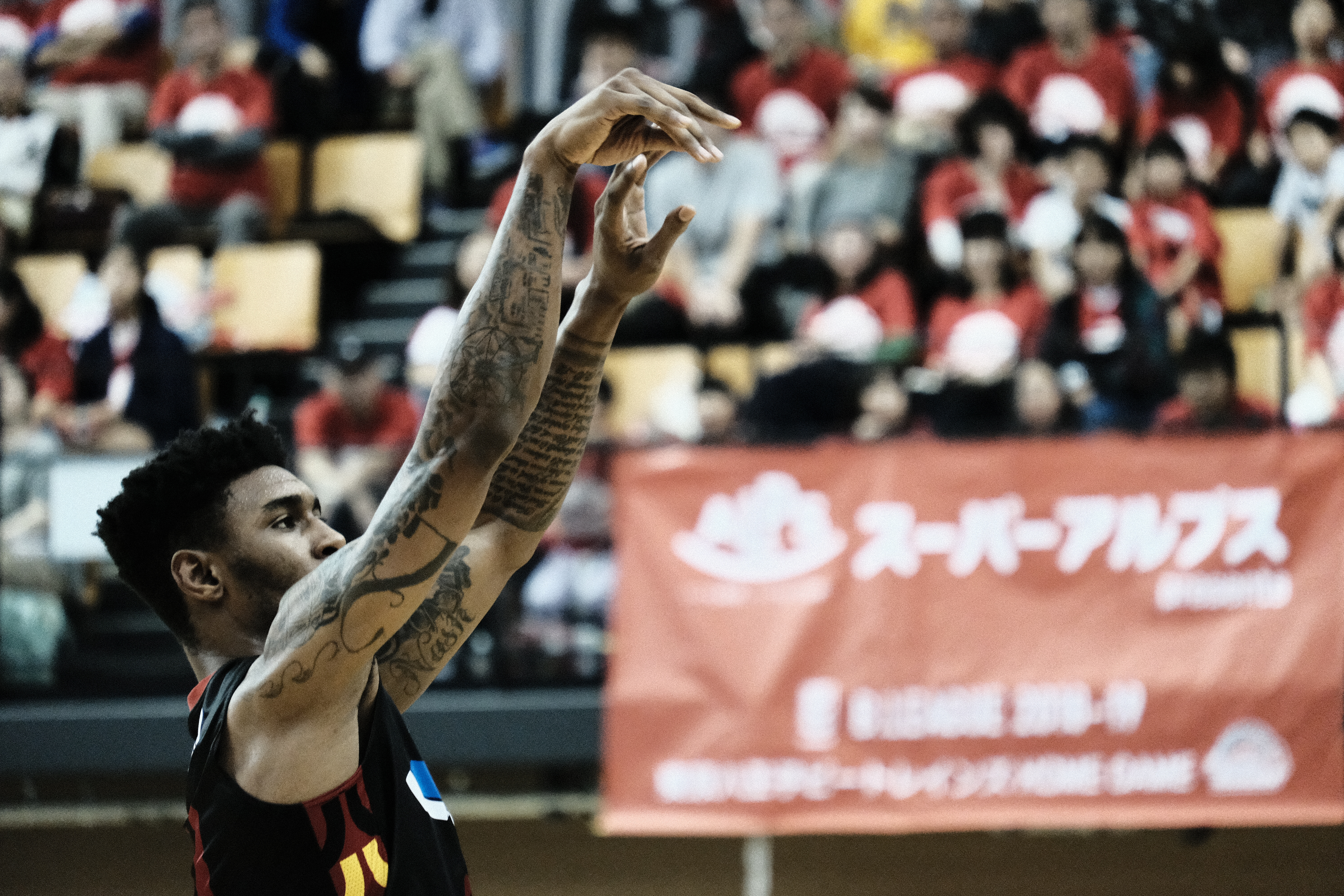
Nash with Hachioji

On August 24, 2018, Tokyo Hachioji Bee Trains of the B.League had been reported to have tabbed Nash.

=== Maccabi Haifa (2020) ===
After spending the 2019–20 season with Peñarol in Uruguay where he averaged 19.8 points per game, Nash signed with Maccabi Haifa of the Israeli Premier League on August 14, 2020. In the first two games, he averaged 14.5 points and 6.5 rebounds per game. He was released by the team due to disciplinary reasons on October 24, 2020.

=== RANS Simba Bogor (2023–2024) ===
In December 2023, Nash signed with the RANS Simba Bogor of the Indonesian Basketball League (IBL).

On August 26, 2024, Nash signed with the Phoenix Fuel Masters of the Philippine Basketball Association (PBA) to replace Jayveous McKinnis as the team's import for the 2024 PBA Governors' Cup. However he is ruled ineligible to play after he was measured to be 6 ft 6 3/8 in (199 cm) tall, surpassing the 6 ft 6 in (198 cm) foot height cap for the Governors' Cup. Phoenix attempted to bring Nash in despite being often listed as 6 ft 7 in (201 cm) due to Nash being listed as 6 ft 4 in (193 cm) in the IBL.

=== Satria Muda Pertamina (2024–2025) ===
In December 2024, Nash signed with the Satria Muda Pertamina of the Indonesian Basketball League (IBL).

== Personal life ==
Nash became a father in September 2014 to a daughter, LeKenleigh Nash.

== Awards and honors ==
- 2008 Newcomer the Year
- 2009 and 2010 All-Area First Team
- 2009 and 2010 All-State
- 2010 FIBA America U18 Champion
- 2011 McDonald's All-American team selection
- 3 time (2008, 2009, 2010) All-Conference selection
