= Masashi Joho =

Japanese basketball player

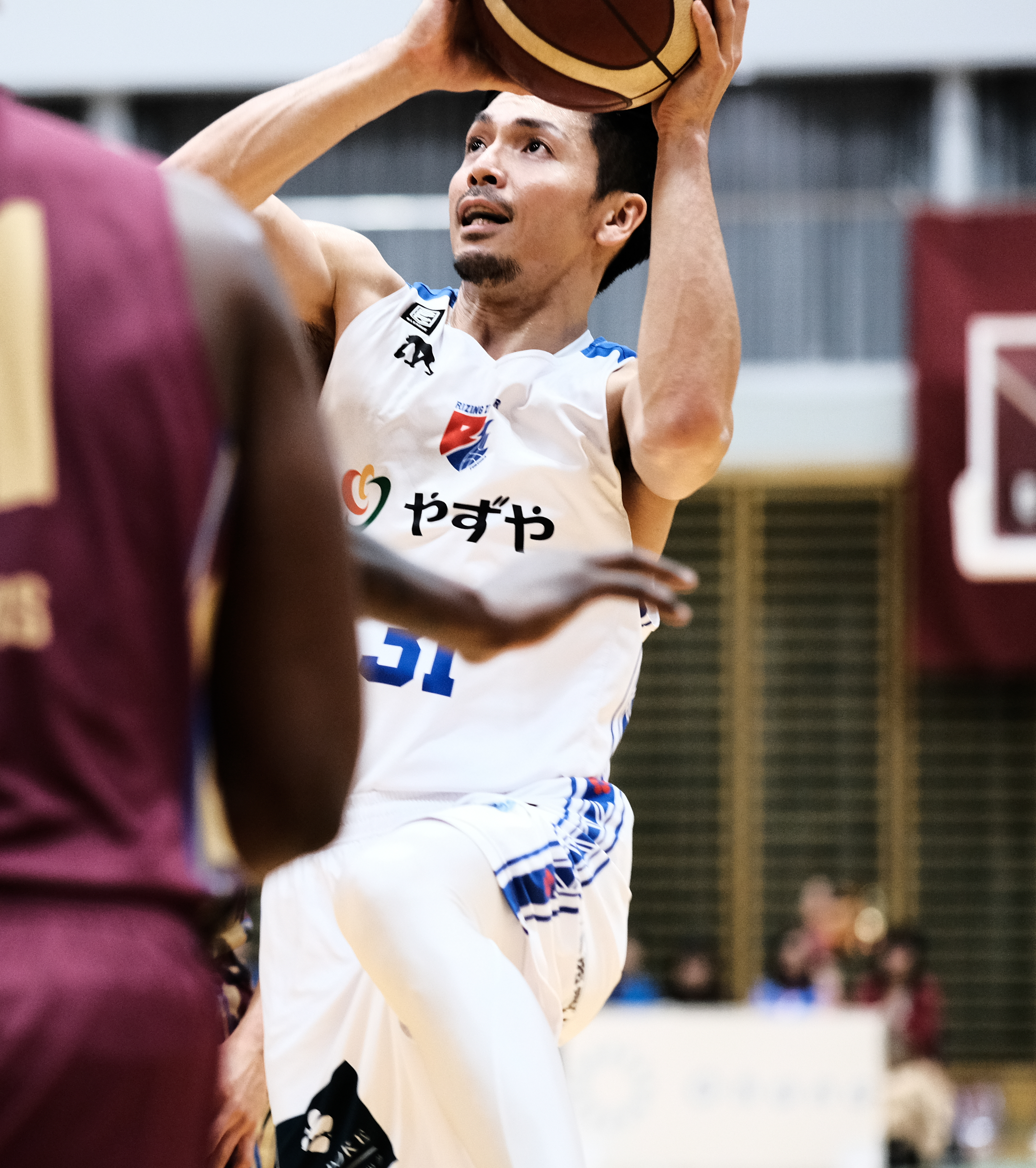
- Joho with Fukuoka in 2019

Yokohama Excellence
- Title: Assistant coach
- League: B.League

Personal information
- Born: April 24, 1982 (age 44) Sapporo, Hokkaido
- Listed height: 6 ft 0 in (1.83 m)
- Listed weight: 183 lb (83 kg)

Career information
- High school: Oasa (Ebetsu, Hokkaido)
- College: Osaka University of Commerce
- Playing career: 2005–2023
- Position: Shooting guard
- Number: 31
- Coaching career: 2023–present

Career history

Playing
- 2005–2007: Osaka Evessa
- 2007–2009: Tokyo Apache
- 2009–2011: Shiga Lakestars
- 2011–2017: Toyama Grouses
- 2017–2018: Niigata Albirex BB
- 2018–2020: Rizing Zephyr Fukuoka
- 2020-2021: Toyama Grouses
- 2021-2022: Ehime Orange Vikings
- 2022-2023: Earthfriends Tokyo Z

Coaching
- 2023-present: Yokohama Excellence

Career highlights
- bj league MVP (2014); 3× bj league Best Five

Masashi Joho (城宝匡史, Jōhō Masashi; born April 24, 1982) is a retired Japanese professional basketball player who played for the Ehime Orange Vikings of the B.League in Japan. He is the first and only Japanese bj leaguer that acquired the regular season MVP award.

== Career statistics ==
Legend
GP	Games played	GS	Games started	MPG	Minutes per game
FG%	Field goal percentage	3P%	3-point field goal percentage	FT%	Free throw percentage
RPG	Rebounds per game	APG	Assists per game	SPG	Steals per game
BPG	Blocks per game	PPG	Points per game	**Bold**	Career high

=== Regular season ===
Year	Team	GP	GS	MPG	FG%	3P%	FT%	RPG	APG	SPG	BPG	PPG
2005-06	Osaka	33		28.4	.363	.350	.730	3.3	1.2	1.0	0.0	8.7
2006-07	Osaka	36		18.3	.389	.376	.714	1.4	1.0	0.5	0.1	6.7
2007-08	Tokyo Apache	41		17.1	.379	.346	.786	1.6	1.7	0.8	0.1	7.6
2008-09	Tokyo Apache	51	43	25.5	.338	.298	.707	2.7	2.2	1.4	0.1	10.0
2009-10	Shiga	52	48	31.9	.370	.298	.731	2.8	1.9	1.3	0.1	15.0
2010-11	Shiga	50	50	27.0	.410	.342	.744	2.2	1.7	1.0	0.1	13.1
2011-12	Toyama	48	48	36.7	.381	.327	.759	4.1	3.1	1.8	0.0	15.3
2012-13	Toyama	49	49	31.8	.385	.292	.723	3.6	3.6	1.6	0.1	13.7
2013-14	Toyama	52	52	33.4	.399	.349	.802	3.6	3.7	1.3	0.0	17.4
2014-15	Toyama	45	45	32.0	.380	.368	.770	3.2	3.4	1.5	0.2	16.7
2015-16	Toyama	52	52	32.0	.423	.347	.789	3.2	3.9	1.4	0.0	17.1

== Personal ==
He tied the knot to tarento Mayu Nagao in 2015.
