= Jeff Parmer =

American basketball player (born 1985)

No. 4 – Koshigaya Alphas
- Position: Power forward
- League: B.League

Personal information
- Born: April 27, 1985 (age 41) Niagara Falls, New York, U.S.
- Listed height: 6 ft 8 in (2.03 m)
- Listed weight: 234 lb (106 kg)

Career information
- High school: Niagara Falls (Niagara Falls, New York)
- College: Providence (2004–2005); Palm Beach CC (2005–2006); Florida Atlantic (2006–2008)
- NBA draft: 2008: undrafted
- Playing career: 2008–present

Career history
- 2008–2009: CB L'Hospitalet
- 2009: Club Biguá de Villa Biarritz
- 2009–2010: HNV-Consmetal Navarra
- 2010–2013: Hamamatsu Higashimikawa Phoenix
- 2013–2014: Shinshu Brave Warriors
- 2014–2016: Shiga Lakestars
- 2016–2018: Yokohama B-Corsairs
- 2018–2019: Bambitious Nara
- 2019–2020: Tryhoop Okayama
- 2020–2021: Rizing Zephyr Fukuoka
- 2021–2024: Tryhoop Okayama
- 2024–2025: Shonan United
- 2025: Alvark Tokyo
- 2025–present: Koshigaya Alphas

Career highlights
- bj League champion (2011); bj League MVP (2011); bj League All-Star (2011); bj League Best Five (2011)

Jefferey Jamal Parmer (born April 27, 1985) is an American professional basketball player for the Koshigaya Alphas of the B.League.

== Professional career ==
In August 21, 2019, Parmer signed with the Tryhoop Okayama of the B.League.

In December 12, 2024, Parmer signed a short-term contract with the Shonan United of the B.League.

== Career statistics ==
Legend
GP	Games played	GS	Games started	MPG	Minutes per game
FG%	Field goal percentage	3P%	3-point field goal percentage	FT%	Free throw percentage
RPG	Rebounds per game	APG	Assists per game	SPG	Steals per game
BPG	Blocks per game	PPG	Points per game	**Bold**	Career high

Year	Team	GP	GS	MPG	FG%	3P%	FT%	RPG	APG	SPG	BPG	PPG
2010-11	Hamamatsu	46	45	26.7	.510	.320	.774	9.0	2.5	1.6	.4	16.9
2011-12	Hamamatsu	52	47	24.6	.434	.331	.770	6.5	1.7	1.0	.4	12.6
2012-13	Hamamatsu	50	42	29.1	.391	.291	.782	6.3	2.9	1.2	.3	13.6
2013-14	Shinshu	48		28.9	.445	.254	.777	7.6	2.5	1.7	.5	11.8
2014-15	Shiga											
2015-16	Shiga	51		27.6	.552	.315	.702	7.5	2.3	1.4	0.6	12.9
2016-17	Yokohama	60	53	30:25	.440	.322	.723	7.8	1.6	1.1	0.78	15.0
