= Bj league =

Japanese professional basketball league

Coordinates: 35°28′20″N 133°03′55″E

bj league
- Sport: basketball
- Founded: 2005
- First season: 2005–06
- Folded: 2016
- Replaced by: B.League
- Owners: Basketball Japan League Co., Ltd.
- Commissioner: Toshimitsu Kawachi
- No. of teams: 24
- Country: Japan
- Continent: FIBA Asia
- Last champion: Ryukyu Golden Kings (4th title)
- Most titles: Ryukyu Golden Kings (4 titles)
- Broadcasters: BS Fuji, Gaora
- Sponsor: Turkish Airlines (2014–2016)
- Level on pyramid: 1

The bj league (日本プロバスケットボールリーグ, Nihon Puro Basukettobōru Rīgu; spelled in all lowercase, also referred to as the Basketball Japan League) was a professional basketball league in Japan that began in November 2005 as a six-team league. The league was operated as a competitor to the established Japan Super League which was run by the Japan Basketball Association, the official governing body of basketball in Japan. Over the next ten years the league saw continual expansion, with at least one new team joining every season, reaching 24 teams divided into two conferences in its final season in 2015–16. Turkish Airlines was the major sponsor of the 2014–15 and 2015–16 seasons.

The bj league operated on the American sports franchise system. This was in contrast to the Japan Super League and its successor, the National Basketball League, which was a corporate league composed primarily of company teams and other clubs affiliated with the JBA. There was no system of promotion and relegation between the two leagues. This division in the administration of the sport resulted in FIBA suspending the JBA from November 2014 until August 2015. As a condition of lifting the suspension, the bj league merged with the NBL and the National Basketball Development League to form the B.League.

== History ==
The formation of the league commenced in August 2004 with an announcement by Niigata Albirex BB and Saitama Broncos that they were withdrawing their membership of the Japan Basketball Association, and the establishment of an intermediary corporation later the same month that was tasked with forming a new league. In November 2004 the formation of the bj league was officially announced, with four newly-formed clubs (Oita Heat Devils, Osaka Deinonychus, Sendai 89ers and Tokyo Apache) to join the Niigata and Saitama teams. In May 2005 the owners of the Osaka franchise faced financial difficulty and transferred their licence to the club's intended main sponsor, who instead formed Osaka Evessa. In October 2005, three weeks prior to the start of the league's first season, the league announced its first expansion, with the Takamatsu Five Arrows and Toyama Grouses to join the 2006–07 season.

The 2005–06 season was a 40-match season, with each club playing 8 matches against each other. The inaugural game occurred on November 5, 2005 at Ariake Coliseum between the Tokyo Apache and Niigata Albirex. The Apache, led by Joe Bryant won in overtime by a score of 93-90 with Darin Maki scoring the first every basket in the opening seconds. Osaka and Niigata dominated the first season of the league with 31 and 29 wins respectively; Osaka became inaugural league champions by defeating Niigata 74–64 in the championship match.

The inclusion of the Takamatsu and Toyama teams saw the league separate into 4-team Eastern and Western conferences in the 2006–07 season. Each team again played 40 matches; eight against each of the teams in their conference and four against each of the teams in the opposing conference. However, teams were ranked in a single standings table, meaning three Western Conference teams (Osaka, Takamatsu and Tokyo) and Niigata competed in the semi-finals. Osaka claimed a second championship by defeating 94–78 in the final. The season also saw the league hold its first all-star match and announce that a further two expansion teams, Rizing Fukuoka and Ryukyu Golden Kings, would join the following season.

== Teams ==
Eastern Conference

- Akita Northern Happinets (Akita Prefecture)
- Aomori Wat's (Aomori Prefecture)
- Fukushima Firebonds (Fukushima Prefecture)
- Gunma Crane Thunders (Gunma Prefecture)
- Iwate Big Bulls (Iwate Prefecture)
- Niigata Albirex BB (Niigata, Niigata Prefecture)
- Saitama Broncos (Saitama Prefecture)
- Sendai 89ers (Sendai, Miyagi Prefecture)
- Shinshu Brave Warriors (Nagano Prefecture)
- Tokyo Cinq Rêves (Tokyo)
- Toyama Grouses (Toyama Prefecture)
- Yokohama B-Corsairs (Yokohama, Kanagawa Prefecture)

Western Conference

- Bambitious Nara (Nara Prefecture)
- Hamamatsu Higashimikawa Phoenix (Hamamatsu, Shizuoka Prefecture, and Higashimikawa Area, Aichi Prefecture)
- Hiroshima Lightning (Hiroshima Prefecture)
- Kanazawa Samuraiz (Ishikawa Prefecture)
- Kyoto Hannaryz (Kyoto Prefecture)
- Oita Ehime HeatDevils (Ōita city, Ōita Prefecture and Matsuyama, Ehime Prefecture)
- Osaka Evessa (Osaka Prefecture)
- Rizing Fukuoka (Fukuoka Prefecture)
- Ryukyu Golden Kings (Okinawa Prefecture)
- Shiga Lakestars (Shiga Prefecture)
- Shimane Susanoo Magic (Shimane Prefecture)
- Takamatsu Five Arrows (Takamatsu, Kagawa Prefecture)

Former teams

- Chiba Jets (Chiba Prefecture) (Joined the NBL for the 2013–14 season)

Defunct teams

- Tokyo Apache (Tokyo)
- Miyazaki Shining Suns (Miyazaki Prefecture)

== Expansion ==
The bj league had rapidly expanded since its inauguration as a six-team league in 2005. The league expanded to 22 teams for the 2014–15 season with the addition of the Fukushima Firebonds. For its final season the number increased to 24 with the addition of Kanazawa Samuraiz and Hiroshima Lightning.

== Playoff champions ==
Season	Champions	Runners-up
2005–06	Osaka Evessa	Niigata Albirex BB
2006–07	Osaka Evessa	Takamatsu Five Arrows
2007–08	Osaka Evessa	Tokyo Apache
2008–09	Ryukyu Golden Kings	Tokyo Apache
2009–10	Hamamatsu Higashimikawa Phoenix	Osaka Evessa
2010–11	Hamamatsu Higashimikawa Phoenix	Ryukyu Golden Kings
2011–12	Ryukyu Golden Kings	Hamamatsu Higashimikawa Phoenix
2012–13	Yokohama B-Corsairs	Rizing Fukuoka
2013–14	Ryukyu Golden Kings	Akita Northern Happinets
2014–15	Hamamatsu Higashimikawa Phoenix	Akita Northern Happinets
2015–16	Ryukyu Golden Kings	Toyama Grouses

== All-star game ==
Season	Date	Arena	Host city	Result	MVP (Team)
2006–07	January 27, 2007	Ginowan Municipal Gymnasium	Ginowan City, Okinawa Prefecture	EAST 126–97 WEST	Jerod Ward (Toyama Grouses)
2007–08	December 29, 2007	Toki Messe	Niigata City, Niigata Prefecture	EAST 121–94 WEST	Naoto Kosuge (Niigata Albirex BB)
2008–09	January 25, 2009	Beppu Beacon Plaza	Beppu, Ōita Prefecture	EAST 117–96 WEST	Bobby St. Preux (Sendai 89ERS)
2009–10	January 31, 2010	Sekisui Heim Super Arena	Rifu, Miyagi Prefecture	WEST 105–102 EAST	Michael Parker (Rizing Fukuoka)
2010–11	January 23, 2011	Osaka Prefectural Gymnasium	Osaka, Osaka Prefecture	WEST 110–109 EAST	Lynn Washington (Osaka Evessa)
2011–12	January 15, 2012	Saitama Super Arena	Saitama, Saitama Prefecture	WEST 120–93 EAST	Lynn Washington (Osaka Evessa)
2012–13	January 20, 2013	Ariake Coliseum	Koto Ward, Tokyo	WEST 128–119 EAST	Michael Parker (Shimane Susanoo Magic)
2013–14	January 26, 2014	Akita Municipal Gymnasium	Akita, Akita Prefecture	EAST 98–91 WEST	Yuki Togashi (Akita Northern Happinets)
2014–15	February 1, 2015	ALSOK Gunma Arena	Gunma, Gunma Prefecture	WEST 105–94 EAST	Terrance Woodbury (Shiga Lakestars)
2015–16	January 26, 2016	Xebio Arena Sendai	Sendai, Miyagi Prefecture	EAST 115–108 WEST	Le'Bryan Nash (Fukushima Firebonds)

== Awards ==
=== Season MVP ===
Season	Recipient	Team
2005–06	Lynn Washington	Osaka Evessa
2006–07	David Palmer	Osaka Evessa
2007–08	Lynn Washington	Osaka Evessa
2008–09	Jeff Newton	Ryukyu Golden Kings
2009–10	Wendell White	Hamamatsu Higashimikawa Phoenix
2010–11	Jeffrey Parmer	Hamamatsu Higashimikawa Phoenix
2011–12	Justin Burrell	Yokohama B-Corsairs
2012–13	Anthony McHenry	Ryukyu Golden Kings
2013–14	Masashi Joho	Toyama Grouses
2014–15	Kejuan Johnson	Sendai 89ers
2015–16	Wendell White	Sendai 89ers

=== Best 5 ===
Season	Guard		Forward		Center
2005–06	Matt Lottich (Osaka Evessa)	Yukinori Suzuki (Oita Heat Devils)	Michael Jackson (Sendai 89ERS)	William Pippen (Tokyo Apache)	Nick Davis (Niigata Albirex BB)
2006–07	Kohei Aoki (Tokyo Apache)	Rasheed Sparks (Takamatsu Five Arrows)	Lynn Washington (Osaka Evessa)	Andy Ellis (Oita Heat Devils)	Nick Davis (Niigata Albirex BB)
2007–08	Mikey Marshall (Osaka Evessa)	Naoto Takushi (Ryukyu Golden Kings)	Reggie Warren (Takamatsu Five Arrows)	Andy Ellis (Oita Heat Devils)	Patrick Whearty (Sendai 89ERS)
2008–09	Michael Gardener (Hamamatsu Higashimikawa Phoenix)	Naoto Takushi (Ryukyu Golden Kings)	Bobby St. Preux (Sendai 89ERS)	Lynn Washington (Osaka Evessa)	Jeff Newton (Ryukyu Golden Kings)
2009–10	Kohei Aoki (Tokyo Apache)	Mahmoud Abdul-Rauf (Kyoto Hannaryz)	Michael Parker (Rizing Fukuoka)	Wendell White (Hamamatsu Higashimikawa Phoenix)	Julius Ashby (Tokyo Apache)
2010–11	Wayne Arnold (Hamamatsu Higashimikawa Phoenix)	Takumi Ishizaki (Shimane Susanoo Magic)	Jeffrey Parmer (Hamamatsu Higashimikawa Phoenix)	Michael Parker (Rizing Fukuoka)	Anthony McHenry (Ryukyu Golden Kings)
2011–12	Jermaine Dixon (Hamamatsu Higashimikawa Phoenix)	Masashi Joho (Toyama Grouses)	Kevin Palmer (Rizing Fukuoka)	Justin Burrell (Yokohama B-Corsairs)	Atsuya Ohta (Hamamatsu Higashimikawa Phoenix)
2012–13	Narito Namizato (Ryukyu Golden Kings)	Draelon Burns (Yokohama B-Corsairs)	Anthony McHenry (Ryukyu Golden Kings)	Chris Holm (Niigata Albirex BB)	Jeral Davis (Shimane Susanoo Magic)

Season	Guard		Forward/Center		
2013–14	Yuki Togashi (Akita Northern Happinets)	Masashi Joho (Toyama Grouses)	Ira Brown (Toyama Grouses)	Reggie Warren (Rizing Fukuoka)	Anthony McHenry (Ryukyu Golden Kings)
2014–15	Shigehiro Taguchi (Akita Northern Happinets)	Kejuan Johnson (Sendai 89ers)	Scootie Randall (Iwate Big Bulls)	Richard Roby (Akita Northern Happinets)	Reggie Warren (Rizing Fukuoka)
2015–16	Ryuichi Kishimoto (Ryukyu Golden Kings)	Masashi Joho (Toyama Grouses)	Le'Bryan Nash (Fukushima Firebonds)	Wendell White (Sendai 89ers)	Josh Davis (Shimane Susanoo Magic)

=== Slam Dunk Contest Winners ===
- 2007: Sparks
- 2008: Sparks
- 2009: Simpson
- 2010: Tachibana
- 2011: Tachibana
- 2012: Humphrey
- 2013: Cunningham
- 2014: Andrews
- 2015: Stephens
- 2016: Florveus

=== Three-Point Contest Winners ===
- 2007: Garrison
- 2008: Garrison
- 2009: Suzuki
- 2010: Okada
- 2011: Okada
- 2012: Aoki
- 2013: Okada
- 2014: Sanders
- 2015: Taguchi
- 2016: Taguchi
