= Mike Chappell =

American basketball player (born 1978)

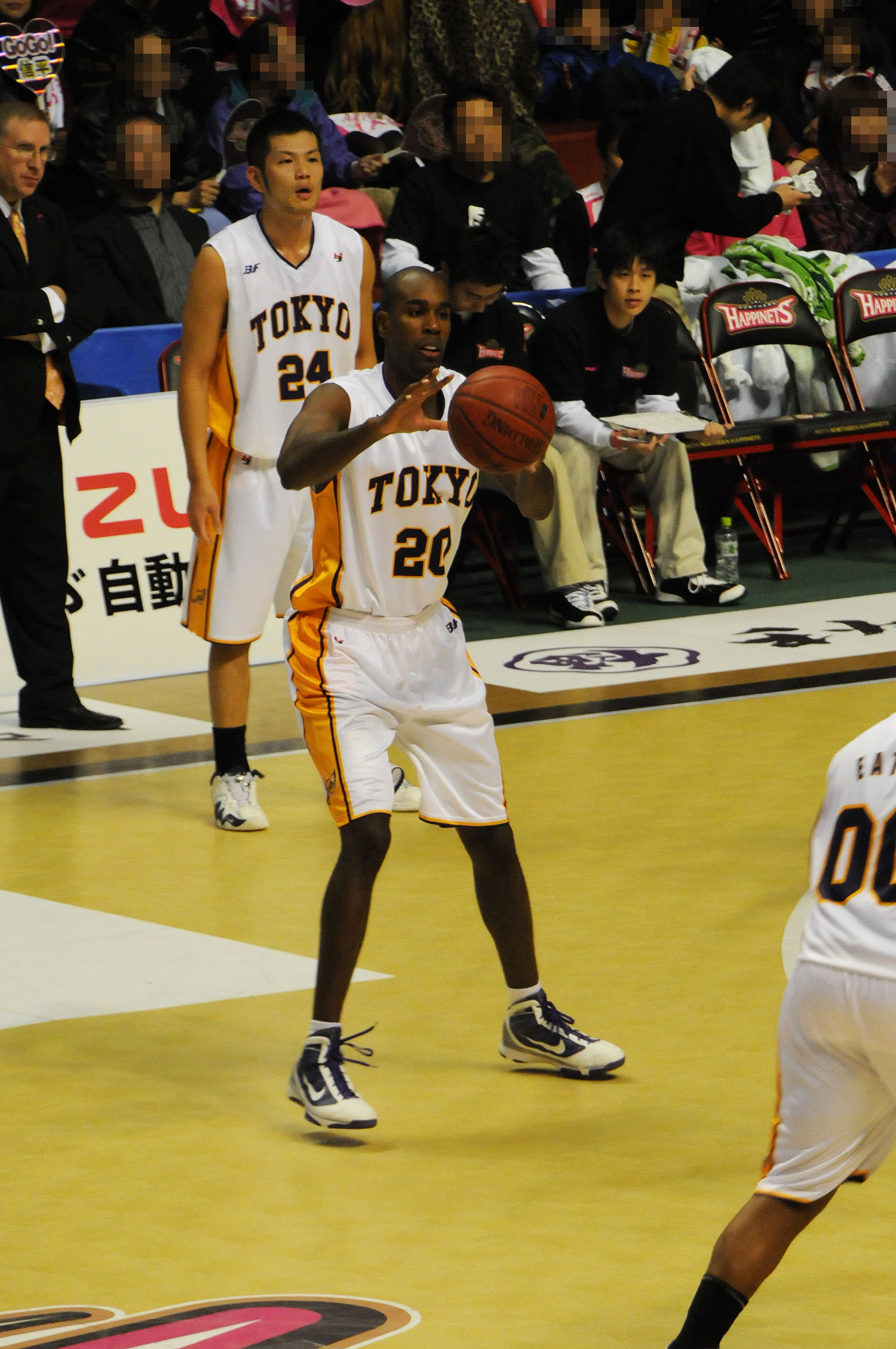
- Chappell with the Tokyo Apache in 2010

Personal information
- Born: January 21, 1978 (age 48) Southfield, Michigan, U.S.
- Listed height: 6 ft 9 in (2.06 m)
- Listed weight: 215 lb (98 kg)

Career information
- High school: Southfield-Lathrup (Lathrup Village, Michigan)
- College: Duke (1996–1998); Michigan State (1999–2001)
- NBA draft: 2001: undrafted
- Playing career: 2001–2011
- Position: Shooting guard / small forward

Career history
- 2001–2002: Wollongong Hawks
- 2002: Mount Gambier Pioneers
- 2002–2003: Canberra Cannons
- 2003–2004: New Zealand Breakers
- 2004: Waikato Titans
- 2004–2005: New Zealand Breakers
- 2005–2006: Champville SC
- 2006–2007: Sendai 89ers
- 2007–2008: Adelaide 36ers
- 2008: Vaqueros de Bayamón
- 2008–2009: Budivelnyk
- 2009: Hebraica y Macabi
- 2009–2011: Tokyo Apache

Career highlights
- All-NBL Third Team (2004); NCAA champion (2000); Third-team Parade All-American (1996)

Michael Lawrence Chappell (born January 21, 1978) is a retired American professional basketball player born in Southfield, Michigan.

== College career ==
After being recruited heavily by the top universities in America, Mike Chappell attended college at Duke University from 1996 to 1998 and was coached under Mike Krzyzewski. At Duke, Chappell started in over half of their games in 1998. Chappell transferred to Michigan State University in the fall of 1998. Under the leadership of Tom Izzo, Chappell contributed to a dynamic team that won the NCAA National Title in 2000 and made it to the Final Four in 2001.

== Professional career ==
Upon graduation from Michigan State University, Chappell joined the rosters of the Wollongong Hawks (2001–2002) and Canberra Cannons (2002–2003) in the Australian National Basketball League (NBL). His popularity within the NBL brought him back to star for the New Zealand Breakers in 2003. In 2004, Mike Chappell set a new NBL record after scoring an explosive 44-points in a game against the Perth Wildcats. Word of Chappell's success in the NBL reached the US, and he was selected to play for the Toronto Raptors in the 2004 NBA Summer League in Minnesota.

During the 2002 NBL off-season, Chappell and the Cannons embarked on a short tour of the United States playing various college teams. On one occasion they played against the Michigan State Spartans at the Breslin Center. For that game, the Cannons featured former Michigan State player, NBA legend with the Los Angeles Lakers and one of the most decorated players in basketball history, Earvin "Magic" Johnson. The game, a celebration of Johnson's induction into the Hall of Fame in 2002, saw the Cannons defeat the Spartans 104–85.

After his stint in the NBL, Mike Chappell ventured out into Europe where he played in Portugal (Queluz). He also has played basketball professionally in Lebanon (Champville). In August 2006, Chappell signed a deal to join the Sendai 89ers for the Basketball Japan League. In May 2007, Chappell signed a deal to join the Adelaide 36ers as their second import, which saw him returning to the Australian NBL once again. One of Chappell's new teammates at the 36ers was his Michigan State teammate of 1999–2001, Adam Ballinger.

Joined Ukrainian Basketball League club Budivelnik Kyiv (Kiev) from summer 2008 to December 2008. Joined Basketball Japan League club Tokyo Apache autumn 2009. Made playoffs against Hamamatsu Higashimikawa Phoenix where they lost. Left the club in May 2010.

== Personal life ==
When he is not playing basketball, Chappell's favorite pastime is spending time with his son, Isaiah Chappell, who was born in Auckland, New Zealand on March 16, 2005 and consequently holds dual citizenship. The New Zealand national basketball team, The Tall Blacks, has jokingly extended an open invitation for Chappell's son to join their roster some day.
