= Michael Gardener =

Michael Gardener may refer to:

- Michael Gardener (priest) (born 1930), Canadian priest
- Michael Gardener (basketball) (born 1981), American basketball player
