= Jeremy Tyler =

American basketball player (born 1991)

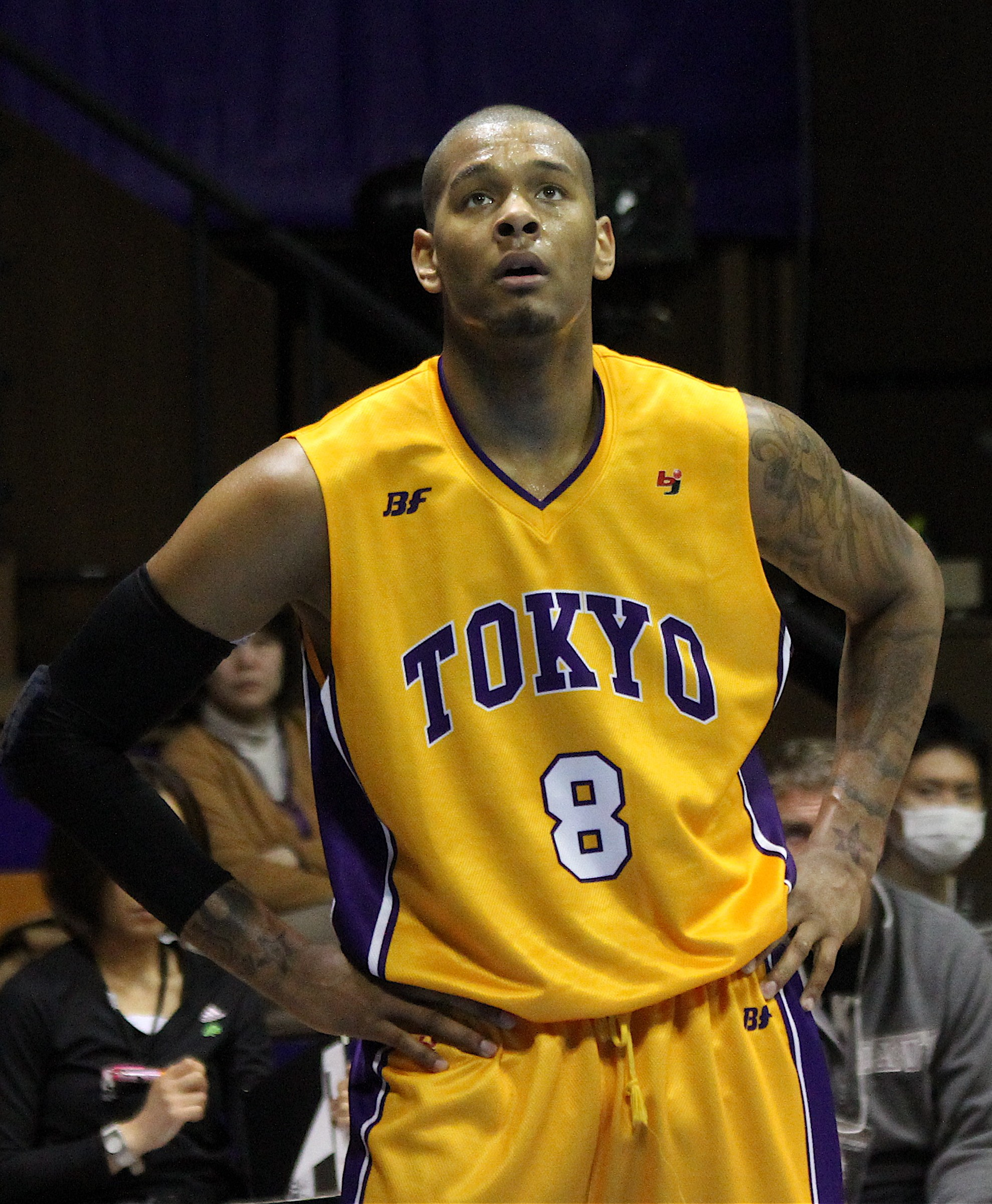
- Tyler in 2011 with Tokyo Apache

Free agent
- Position: Center / power forward

Personal information
- Born: June 21, 1991 (age 35) San Diego, California, U.S.
- Listed height: 6 ft 10 in (2.08 m)
- Listed weight: 260 lb (118 kg)

Career information
- High school: San Diego (San Diego, California)
- NBA draft: 2011: 2nd round, 39th overall pick
- Drafted by: Charlotte Bobcats
- Playing career: 2009–present

Career history
- 2009–2010: Maccabi Haifa
- 2010–2011: Tokyo Apache
- 2011–2013: Golden State Warriors
- 2012: →Dakota Wizards
- 2012–2013: →Santa Cruz Warriors
- 2013: Atlanta Hawks
- 2013: Santa Cruz Warriors
- 2013: Erie BayHawks
- 2013–2014: New York Knicks
- 2014–2015: Shanxi Zhongyu
- 2015–2016: Fujian Sturgeons
- 2016–2017: Tianjin Ronggang
- 2017–2018: Sydney Kings
- 2018: TNT KaTropa
- 2019: Guangxi Rhinos
- 2019: Atléticos de San Germán
- 2020: Indios de Mayagüez
- 2021: Liaoning Flying Leopards
- 2022: Piratas de Quebradillas
- 2023: Hsinchu JKO Lioneers
- 2023: Indios de Mayagüez
- 2024: Wisconsin Herd
- 2024: South Bay Lakers
- 2024: Piratas de Quebradillas
- 2025: Central Club
- 2025: Gigantes de Carolina
- 2025: Al Arabi

Career highlights
- Second-team Parade All-American (2009)
- Stats at NBA.com
- Stats at Basketball Reference

Jeremy Miles Tyler (born June 21, 1991) is an American professional basketball player who last played for the Al-Arabi of the Qatari Basketball League. Tyler was drafted with the 39th pick in the 2011 NBA draft by the Charlotte Bobcats but immediately traded to the Golden State Warriors.

== High school career ==
Tyler attended San Diego High School in San Diego, California from 2006 to 2009. As a junior in 2008–09, he averaged 28.7 points per game for the Cavers.

In April 2009, despite a commitment to the University of Louisville, he chose to bypass not only college, but his senior year of high school as well.

== Professional career ==
=== Maccabi Haifa (2009–2010) ===
In April 2009, Tyler announced his intentions to skip his senior year of high school to play professionally abroad. On August 23, 2009, he signed with Maccabi Haifa of the Israeli Super League for the 2009–10 season.

On March 19, 2010, he parted ways with Maccabi due to personal matters and headed home to San Diego. Tyler played just 10 games, averaging only 2.1 points and 1.9 rebounds in 7.6 minutes per game.

=== Tokyo Apache (2010–2011) ===
On July 29, 2010, Tyler signed with the Tokyo Apache of Japan for the 2010–11 season. In 33 games, he averaged 9.9 points on 51.7% shooting and 6.4 rebounds in 15.4 minutes per game. The Apache would dissolve soon after he left due to the impact of the 2011 earthquake and tsunami.

=== Golden State Warriors (2011–2013) ===
Tyler was selected with the 39th overall pick by the Charlotte Bobcats in the 2011 NBA draft. His rights were later traded to the Golden State Warriors for cash considerations on draft night. On December 13, 2011, he signed with the Warriors. On February 27, 2012, he was assigned to the Dakota Wizards and recalled on March 6. For most of his rookie year he received minimal playing time, but on March 21, in a game against the New Orleans Hornets, he was named the Warriors' starting center. He subsequently remained in the team's starting line-up for the rest of the season.

In July 2012, Tyler joined the Warriors for the 2012 NBA Summer League. During his second season, he had multiple assignments with the Santa Cruz Warriors of the NBA Development League.

On February 21, 2013, Tyler was traded to the Atlanta Hawks in exchange for a future second-round pick and waived on March 6 by the Hawks after appearing in just one game.

=== Santa Cruz Warriors (2013) ===
On March 18, 2013, Tyler was acquired by the Santa Cruz Warriors as he played out the rest of the 2012–13 season in the D-League.

In July 2013, Tyler joined the New York Knicks for the 2013 NBA Summer League. On August 6, 2013, he signed with the Knicks. However, he was later waived by the Knicks on October 25, 2013.

After being reacquired by the Santa Cruz Warriors on November 1, 2013, three days later, Tyler was traded to the Erie BayHawks.

=== New York Knicks (2013–2014) ===
On December 31, 2013, he re-signed with the Knicks. On January 28, 2014, he recorded a career-high 17 points, along with 5 rebounds and 2 blocks, in a 114–88 victory over the Boston Celtics. On January 29, he was assigned to the Erie BayHawks, only to be recalled the next day.

In July 2014, Tyler re-joined the Knicks for the 2014 NBA Summer League. On August 6, 2014, he was traded, along with Wayne Ellington and a 2016 second-round pick, to the Sacramento Kings in exchange for Quincy Acy and Travis Outlaw. On September 6, 2014, he was waived by the Kings.

On September 23, 2014, he signed with the Los Angeles Lakers but was waived on October 20.

=== Shanxi Zhongyu (2014–2015) ===
On October 25, 2014, Tyler signed with Shanxi Zhongyu for the 2014–15 CBA season. In 41 games for Shanxi, he averaged 22.1 points, 11.2 rebounds, 1.2 assists, 1.5 steals and 1.3 blocks per game.

=== Houston Rockets (2015) ===
In July 2015, Tyler joined the Dallas Mavericks for the 2015 NBA Summer League where he averaged 11.8 points, 8.3 rebounds and 1.2 steals in six games. On September 28, 2015, he signed with the Houston Rockets. However, he was later waived by the Rockets on October 23 after appearing in two preseason games.

=== Fujian Sturgeons (2015–2016) ===
On November 25, he returned to China, this time signing with the Fujian Sturgeons. He made his debut for the team later that day.

=== Tianjin Ronggang (2016–2017) ===
On September 22, 2016, Tyler signed with Tianjin Ronggang of the Chinese Basketball Association.

=== Sydney Kings (2017–2018) ===
On November 9, 2017, Tyler signed with the Sydney Kings for the rest of the 2017–18 NBL season. On January 9, 2018, he was released by the Kings. In 11 games, he averaged 13.3 points, 5.8 rebounds, 1.3 assists and 1.1 blocks per game.

=== TNT KaTropa (2018) ===
In March 2018, Tyler signed with the TNT KaTropa of the Philippine Basketball Association as their import for the 2018 PBA Commissioner's Cup.

=== Atléticos de San Germán (2019) ===
Tyler played for Atléticos de San Germán of the Baloncesto Superior Nacional league during the 2019–20 season.

=== Liaoning Flying Leopards (2021) ===
In April 2021, Liaoning Flying Leopards announced the signing of Tyler.

=== Wisconsin Herd (2024) ===
On March 1, 2024, Tyler joined the Wisconsin Herd, but was waived on March 18.

=== South Bay Lakers (2024) ===
On March 21, 2024, Tyler joined the South Bay Lakers.

=== Return to Quebradillas (2024) ===
On April 15, 2024, Tyler re-signed with the Piratas de Quebradillas of the Baloncesto Superior Nacional.

=== Central Club (2025–present) ===
On January 3, 2025, Tyler signed with the Central Club of the Lebanese Basketball League.

== NBA career statistics ==
Legend
GP	Games played	GS	Games started	MPG	Minutes per game
FG%	Field goal percentage	3P%	3-point field goal percentage	FT%	Free throw percentage
RPG	Rebounds per game	APG	Assists per game	SPG	Steals per game
BPG	Blocks per game	PPG	Points per game	**Bold**	Career high

=== Regular season ===
Year	Team	GP	GS	MPG	FG%	3P%	FT%	RPG	APG	SPG	BPG	PPG
2011–12	Golden State	**42**	**23**	**13.5**	.421	.000	.558	3.3	**.4**	**.4**	.5	**4.9**
2012–13	Golden State	20	0	3.2	.375	.000	**.667**	.9	.1	.1	.1	1.1
2012–13	Atlanta	1	0	5.0	.000	.000	.000	3.0	.0	.0	.0	.0
2013–14	New York	17	0	10.4	**.556**	.000	.588	**3.4**	.2	.2	**.5**	4.7
Career		80	23	10.2	.446	.000	.573	2.7	.3	.3	.4	3.8
