= Josh Peppers =

American basketball player

Free agent
- Position: Power forward

Personal information
- Born: April 23, 1985 (age 41) Memphis, Tennessee, U.S.
- Listed height: 6 ft 7 in (2.01 m)
- Listed weight: 203 lb (92 kg)

Career information
- High school: Whitehaven (Memphis, Tennessee)
- College: UCF (2003–2007)
- NBA draft: 2007: undrafted
- Playing career: 2007–present

Career history
- 2007–2008: Rizing Fukuoka
- 2008: Hamamatsu Higashimikawa Phoenix
- 2009–2010: Sendai 89ers
- 2011–2012: Shiga Lakestars
- 2012–2013: Rizing Fukuoka
- 2013–2014: Iwate Big Bulls
- 2014–2018: Rizing Fukuoka
- 2018–2019: Otsuka Corporation Koshigaya Alphas
- 2019-2020: Toyama Grouses
- 2020: Sendai 89ers
- 2021: Aisin AW Areions Anjo

Career highlights
- B2 League champion (2018); B2 League Finals MVP (2018); Second-team All-Conference USA (2007); Second-team All-Atlantic Sun (2005)

Josh Peppers (born May 23, 1985) is an American professional basketball player who plays for the Sendai 89ers of the B.League in Japan. He is going to get Japanese citizenship.

== Career statistics ==
Legend
GP	Games played	GS	Games started	MPG	Minutes per game
FG%	Field goal percentage	3P%	3-point field goal percentage	FT%	Free throw percentage
RPG	Rebounds per game	APG	Assists per game	SPG	Steals per game
BPG	Blocks per game	PPG	Points per game	**Bold**	Career high

Year	Team	GP	GS	MPG	FG%	3P%	FT%	RPG	APG	SPG	BPG	PPG
2013-14	Iwate	52		20.3	.452	.299	.738	4.7	1.4	1.1	0.2	12.9
2014-15	Fukuoka	52		33.5	.499	.347	.714	7.4	3.5	1.4	0.6	21.4
2015-16	Fukuoka	40		29.0	.466	.286	.765	7.2	2.1	1.5	0.3	16.6
