= Joe Bryant =

American basketball player and coach (1954–2024)

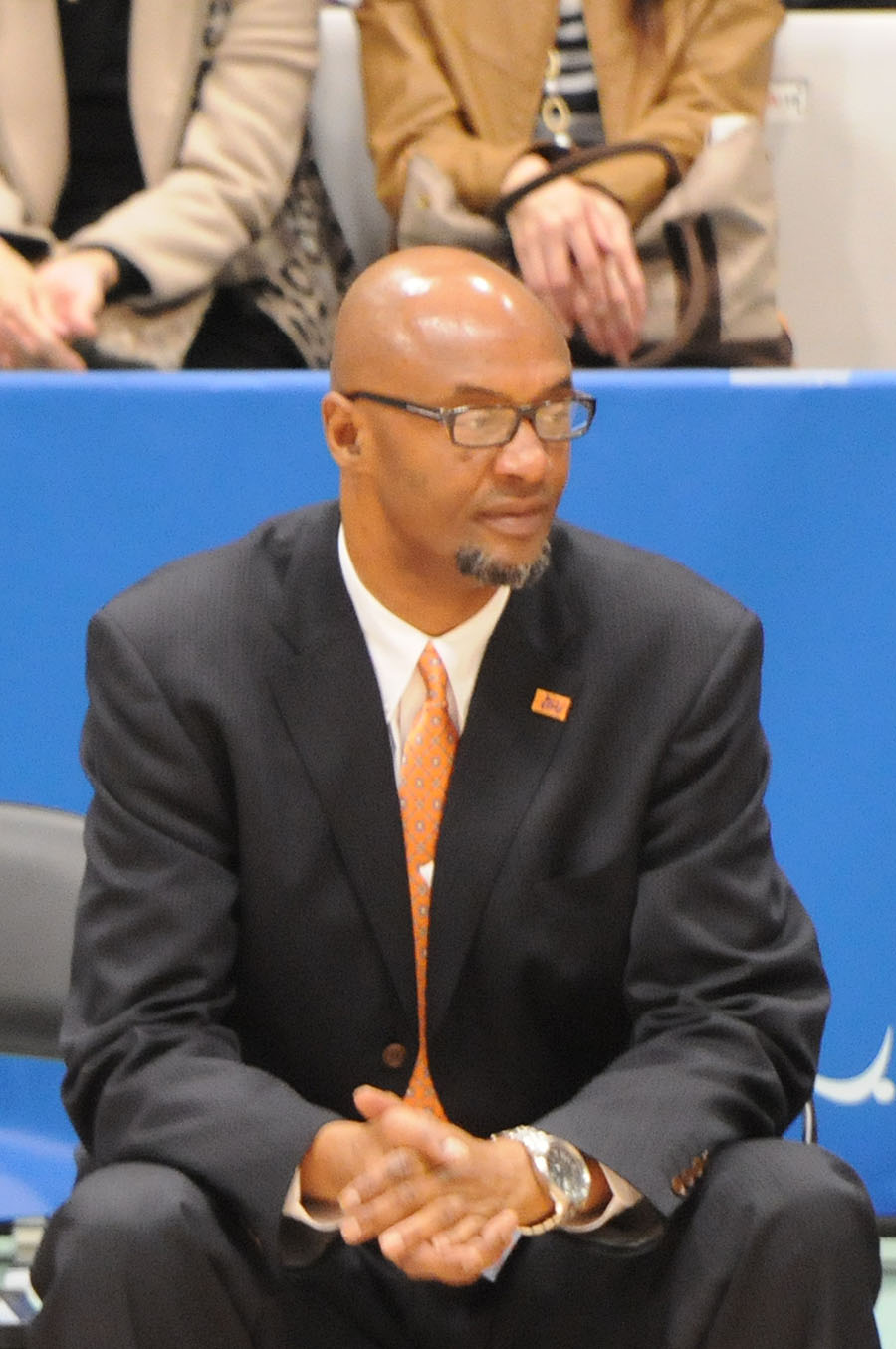
- Bryant coaching Levanga Hokkaido in 2010

Personal information
- Born: October 19, 1954 Philadelphia, Pennsylvania, U.S.
- Died: July 15, 2024 (aged 69)
- Listed height: 6 ft 8 in (2.03 m)
- Listed weight: 185 lb (84 kg)

Career information
- High school: John Bartram (Philadelphia, Pennsylvania)
- College: La Salle (1973–1975)
- NBA draft: 1975: 1st round, 14th overall pick
- Drafted by: Golden State Warriors
- Playing career: 1975–1991
- Position: Power forward / small forward
- Number: 23, 22
- Coaching career: 1992–2015

Career history

Playing
- 1975–1979: Philadelphia 76ers
- 1979–1982: San Diego Clippers
- 1982–1983: Houston Rockets
- 1983–1986: AMG Sebastiani Rieti
- 1986–1987: Standa Reggio Calabria
- 1987–1989: Olimpia Pistoia
- 1989–1991: Reggiana
- 1991–1992: Mulhouse

Career NBA statistics
- Points: 5,252 (8.7 ppg)
- Rebounds: 2,441 (4.0 rpg)
- Assists: 1,049 (1.7 apg)
- Stats at NBA.com
- Stats at Basketball Reference

Joseph Washington "Jellybean" Bryant (October 19, 1954 – July 15, 2024) was an American professional basketball player and coach. He played for the Philadelphia 76ers, San Diego Clippers, and Houston Rockets of the National Basketball Association (NBA). He also played for several teams in Italy and one in France. Bryant was the head coach of the WNBA's Los Angeles Sparks from 2005 to 2007 and returned to that position for the remainder of the 2011 WNBA season. Bryant also coached in Japan and Thailand. He was the father of the late basketball player Kobe Bryant.

== Professional career ==
=== Philadelphia 76ers (1975–1979) ===
After starring at La Salle University, he was drafted by the Golden State Warriors but traded to his hometown team, the Philadelphia 76ers, where he played for four seasons. In his second season, on the 1976–77 76ers, he played alongside NBA all-stars Julius Erving, Doug Collins, and George McGinnis. The team reached the 1977 NBA Finals, eventually losing to the Portland Trail Blazers, 4 games to 2.

=== San Diego Clippers (1979–1982) ===
Before the 1979–1980 season, the Sixers traded Bryant to the San Diego Clippers, where he spent three seasons. In the first game of the 1979–1980 season, played at home against the Los Angeles Lakers, Bryant memorably had a slam dunk over center Kareem Abdul-Jabbar.

=== Houston Rockets (1982–1983) ===
Following the 1981 season, Bryant was traded to the Houston Rockets, where he played one season, his last in the NBA.

=== Europe (1983–1992) ===
Bryant played overseas in Italy and France from 1982 to 1992, playing for Italian teams Sebastiani Rieti, Standa Reggio Calabria, Olimpia Pistoia, and Reggiana and French team Mulhouse. He ended his playing career in 1992.

== Coaching career ==
=== Akiba Hebrew Academy (1992–1993) ===
Bryant's first coaching position, after returning from Europe, was when he was deployed with the U.S. Armed Forces in Italy. In the 1992–1993 season, he served as the head coach of the women's varsity team at Akiba Hebrew Academy in Lower Merion, Pennsylvania.

=== La Salle Explorers (1993–1996) ===
In June 1993, he left Akiba and accepted an assistant coach position at his alma mater, La Salle University. On May 7, 1996, Bryant resigned from La Salle after his son Kobe announced his intentions to enter the NBA out of high school.

=== SlamBall and ABA coach (2003–2005) ===
Bryant served as coach for the Diablos during the 2003 season of SlamBall.

From 2003 to 2005, Bryant also coached two ABA teams, the Las Vegas Rattlers and the Boston Frenzy.

=== Los Angeles Sparks (2005–2007, 2011) ===
On August 17, 2005, Bryant, who was an assistant coach for the WNBA team Los Angeles Sparks, was named the head coach, succeeding previous coach (and former 76ers teammate) Henry Bibby. During the 2006 season, he led the Sparks to a 25–9 record and a Conference Finals berth. In April 2007, Bryant was replaced as Sparks head coach by Michael Cooper, who had previously helmed the team in 1999–2004.

In 2011, Bryant returned to the Sparks, first as an assistant coach, but later as the head coach for the rest of the 2011 season.

=== International coaching career (2007–2015) ===
Bryant coached the Tokyo Apache of the Japanese bj league from 2007 to 2009.

On July 3, 2009, Bryant signed a contract with Italian club Sebastiani Rieti, whom he had played for. However, the contract fell through, due to the team's move to Naples.

Bryant served as the head coach of Japanese professional basketball team Levanga Hokkaido during the 2010–2011 JBL season.

In January 2012, Bryant was hired as coach of the Bangkok Cobras in the ASEAN Basketball League (ABL). He coached for the 2012 season. Bryant also coached for the Chang Thailand Slammers in 2013.

Bryant coached Rizing Fukuoka of the bj League from 2014 to 2015.

== Career playing statistics ==
Legend
GP	Games played	GS	Games started	MPG	Minutes per game
FG%	Field goal percentage	3P%	3-point field goal percentage	FT%	Free throw percentage
RPG	Rebounds per game	APG	Assists per game	SPG	Steals per game
BPG	Blocks per game	PPG	Points per game	**Bold**	Career high

=== NBA ===
==== Regular season ====
Year	Team	GP	GS	MPG	FG%	3P%	FT%	RPG	APG	SPG	BPG	PPG
1975–76	Philadelphia	75	3	16.0	.422		.626	3.7	.8	.6	.3	7.4
1976–77	Philadelphia	61	0	10.0	.446		.757	1.9	.8	.6	.2	4.4
1977–78	Philadelphia	81	0	15.3	.436		.771	3.5	1.6	.7	.3	6.1
1978–79	Philadelphia	70	0	15.2	.429		.724	3.7	1.5	.7	.1	7.6
1979–80	San Diego	81		28.7	.431	.147	.742	**6.4**	1.8	**1.3**	**.5**	9.3
1980–81	San Diego	**82**		**28.8**	.479	.133	**.791**	5.4	2.3	.9	.4	11.6
1981–82	San Diego	75	49	26.5	**.486**	**.267**	.785	3.7	**2.5**	1.0	.4	**11.8**
1982–83	Houston	81	**56**	25.4	.448	.222	.703	3.4	2.3	1.0	.4	10.0
Career		606	108	21.2	.450	.200	.743	4.0	1.7	.9	.3	8.7

==== Playoffs ====
Year	Team	GP	MPG	FG%	FT%	RPG	APG	SPG	BPG	PPG
1976	Philadelphia	3	**14.3**	**.750**	.714	**4.3**	.3	.3	**.3**	**7.7**
1977	Philadelphia	**10**	7.4	.387	.625	1.5	.7	**.6**	.2	2.9
1978	Philadelphia	**10**	12.2	.447	**.727**	2.5	**.9**	**.6**	.1	5.0
1979	Philadelphia	7	5.0	.385	.500	.1	.6	.1	.0	3.0
Career		30	9.1	.448	.679	1.8	.7	.5	.1	4.1

== Head coaching record ==
Legend
Regular season	G	Games coached	W	Games won	L	Games lost	W–L %	Win–loss %
Playoffs	PG	Playoff games	PW	Playoff wins	PL	Playoff losses	PW–L %	Playoff win–loss %

=== WNBA ===
Team	Year	G	W	L	W–L%	Finish	PG	PW	PL	PW–L%	Result
Los Angeles	2005	6	4	2	.667	4th in Western	2	0	2	.000	Lost Conference Semifinals
Los Angeles	2006	34	25	9	.735	1st in Western	5	2	3	.400	Lost Conference Finals
Los Angeles	2011	24	11	13	.458	5th in Western	–	–	–	–	–
Career		64	40	24	.625		7	2	5	.286	

=== Japan ===
Team	Year	G	W	L	W–L%	Finish	PG	PW	PL	PW–L%	Result
Tokyo Apache	2005–2006	40	20	20	.500	3rd	–	–	–	–	Lost semifinals
Tokyo Apache	2006–2007	40	12	28	.300	8th	–	–	–	–	–
Tokyo Apache	2008–2009	52	33	19	.635	2nd in Eastern	4	3	1	.750	Runners-up
Rera Kamuy Hokkaido	2010–2011	22	6	16	.273	Fired	–	–	–	–	–
Rizing Fukuoka	2014–2015	32	9	23	.281	9th in Western	–	–	–	–	–

== Personal life and death ==
In 1975, Bryant married Pam Cox, sister of former NBA player John "Chubby" Cox III. Their son Kobe, also an NBA player, was subsequently inducted into the Basketball Hall of Fame. Kobe died in a helicopter crash on January 26, 2020, alongside his 13-year-old daughter (Joe's granddaughter) Gianna. Bryant also had two daughters, Sharia and Shaya. The family is Catholic. Through his wife Pam, he was the uncle of professional basketball player John Cox IV.

Bryant died on July 15, 2024 at the age of 69. While no official cause of death was announced, The Philadelphia Inquirer reported that Bryant had recently suffered a major stroke.
