= Wendell White (basketball) =

American basketball player (born 1984)

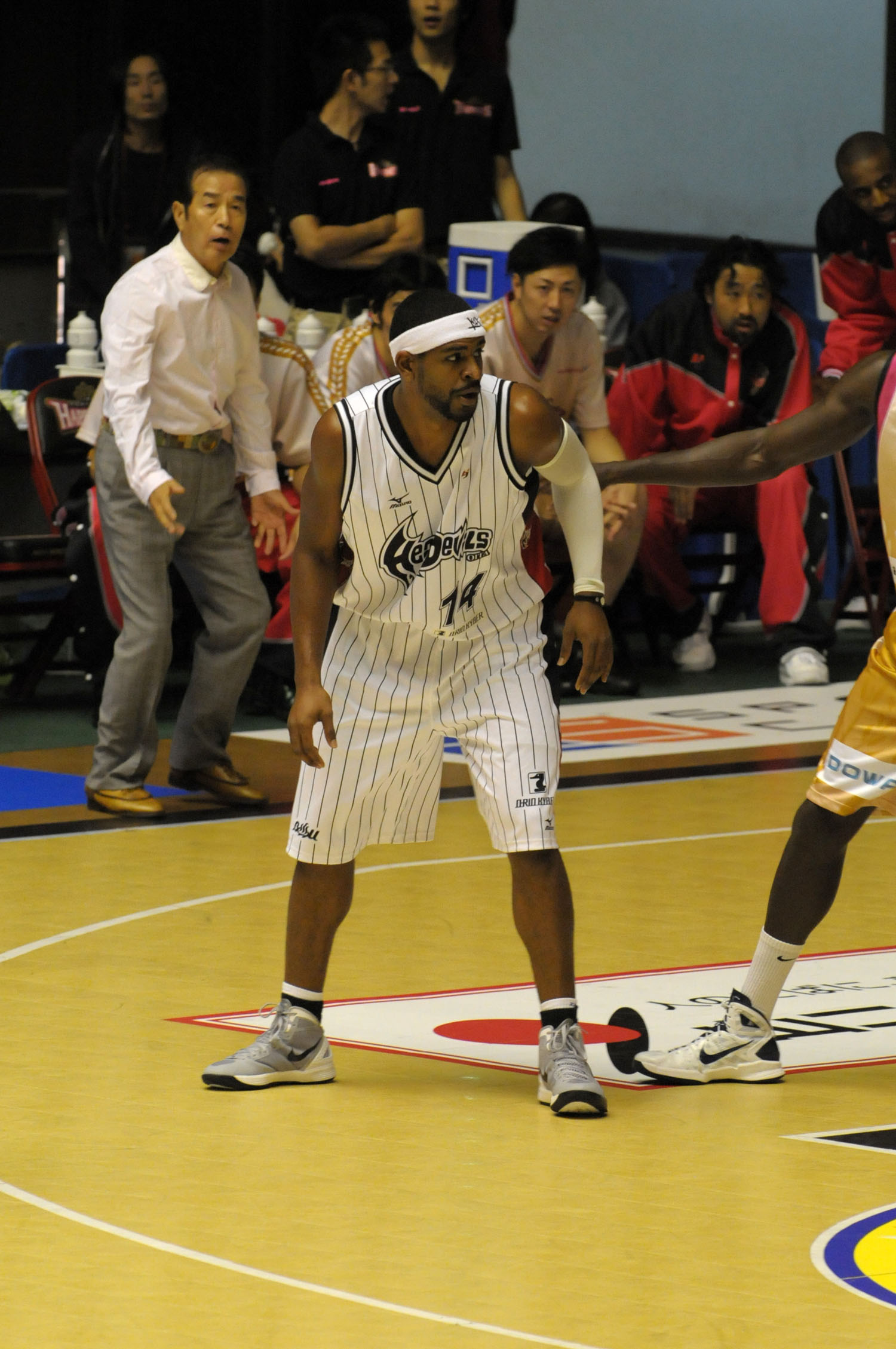

Personal information
- Born: September 3, 1984 (age 41) Carson, California, U.S.
- Listed height: 6 ft 6 in (1.98 m)
- Listed weight: 260 lb (118 kg)

Career information
- High school: Redondo Union (Redondo Beach, California)
- College: Antelope Valley (2003–2005); UNLV (2005–2007)
- NBA draft: 2007: undrafted
- Playing career: 2007–2018
- Position: Power forward

Career history
- 2007–2008: Los Angeles D-Fenders
- 2008–2009: Wonju Dongbu Promy
- 2009–2010: Hamamatsu Phoenix
- 2010–2011: Kyoto Hannaryz
- 2011–2012: Oita Heat Devils
- 2013–2017: Sendai 89ers
- 2017: Hiroshima Dragonflies
- 2017–2018: San-en NeoPhoenix

Career highlights
- bj league champion (2010); bj league MVP (2010); bj league All-Star (2010); Korean Basketball League all-imports team (2009); First-team All-MWC (2007)

Wendell Derek White (born September 3, 1984) is an American former professional basketball player. He has played professionally in the US, South Korea and Japan.

== College career ==
White played two years for Antelope Valley College before receiving a scholarship to the University of Nevada-Las Vegas to play for the Running Rebels from 2005 to 2007, where he averaged 7.73 ppg and 5.3 rpg in 2005–06, and 14.4 ppg and 6.1 rpg in 2006–07. White was an Academic All-Mountain West Conference (MWC) selection in 2006 as a junior and first-team All-MWC selection as a senior in 2007.

== Sweet Sixteen ==
In the second round of the 2006–07 (his senior year) NCAA tournament, White led the UNLV Rebels to a win over the #2 seeded Wisconsin Badgers to get to the sweet sixteen. This was considered a major upset as Wisconsin had been ranked as high as #1 in the country just a few weeks prior to the NCAA tournament. White had 22 points against the Badgers and was player of the game for UNLV. During the NCAA tournament, he averaged 16.6 pts and 5 rebounds.

== Pro career ==
White signed with the Los Angeles D-Fenders of the NBA Development League on October 1, 2007. He averaged 11.8 points, 5.3 rebounds, and 1.6 assists per game with a .519 field goal percentage.

White played for Wonju Dongbu Promy of the Korean Basketball League for the 2008–09 season.

In 2009–10, as a member of Hamamatsu Phoenix, he was the Japanese Professional Basketball League's MVP, averaging 21.7 ppg and 7.0 rpg.

In 2011–12, he led the Oita Heat Devils with 18.6 ppg and 9.8 rpg.

== Personal life ==
White is of Samoan descent through his mother Rosa Fuamatu. He is married to Kelli White (Valentine), daughter of former Major League baseball players Ellis Valentine, and they have one son.

White is also a cousin of another basketball player of Samoan descent, Peyton Siva, and a cousin of former NFL player Chris Fuamatu-Ma'afala.
