= Ryuji Kawai (basketball) =

Japanese basketball player and coach

Shimane Susanoo Magic
- Position: Associate coach
- League: B.League

Personal information
- Born: July 16, 1975 (age 51) Toyohashi, Aichi

Career information
- High school: Okazaki Josei (Okazaki, Aichi)
- Playing career: 1994–1999

Career history

Playing
- 1994-1999: OSG Phoenix

Coaching
- 1999-2009: Hamamatsu Higashimikawa Phoenix (asst.)
- 2011–2013: Hamamatsu Higashimikawa Phoenix
- 2013-2015: Shinshu Brave Warriors
- 2015-2016: Shinshu Brave Warriors (asst.)
- 2016-2017: Oita Ehime Heat Devils
- 2017-2018: Rizing Zephyr Fukuoka
- 2019: Yamagata Wyverns
- 2020-: Shimane Susanoo Magic (associate)

Ryuji Kawai (河合竜児, Kawai Ryuji) is the associate coach of the Shimane Susanoo Magic in the Japanese B.League.

== Head coaching record ==
Legend
Regular season	G	Games coached	W	Games won	L	Games lost	W–L %	Win–loss %
Playoffs	PG	Playoff games	PW	Playoff wins	PL	Playoff losses	PW–L %	Playoff win–loss %

Team	Year	G	W	L	W–L%	Finish	PG	PW	PL	PW–L%	Result
Hamamatsu Higashimikawa Phoenix	2011-12	52	37	15	.712	1st in Eastern	5	3	2	.600	Eastern Champions
Hamamatsu Higashimikawa Phoenix	2012-13	38	23	15	.605	Fired	-	-	-	–	-
Shinshu Brave Warriors	2013-14	52	33	19	.635	4th in Eastern	3	1	2	.333	Lost in 1st round
Shinshu Brave Warriors	2014-15	52	19	33	.365	9th in Eastern	-	-	-	–	-
Oita Ehime Heat Devils	2016	26	10	16	.385	10th in Western	-	-	-	–	-
Ehime Orange Vikings	2016-17	60	29	31	.483	4th in B2 Western	-	-	-	–	-
Rizing Zephyr Fukuoka	2017-18	60	47	13	.783	1st in B2 Western	5	4	1	.800	B2 Champions
Rizing Zephyr Fukuoka	2018-19	7	0	7	.000	Fired				–	
Yamagata Wyverns	2019-20	21	4	17	.190	Fired				–	
Shimane Susanoo Magic	2019-20	11	1	10	.091	6th in Western				–	
