= Matt Garrison (basketball) =

American basketball coach

Personal information
- Born: July 5, 1973 (age 53) Alexandria, Minnesota
- Listed height: 6 ft 8 in (2.03 m)

Career information
- High school: Billings (Billings, Montana)
- College: Montana State (1993–1995); Biola (1996–1998)
- NBA draft: 1998: undrafted
- Position: Forward

Career history

Playing
- ?: Billings RimRockers
- ?: San Diego Stingrays
- ?: Wollongong Hawks
- ?: Cairns Taipans
- 2001: Adelaide 36ers
- 2002–2003: Wollongong Hawks
- ?: Sporting Al Riyadi Beirut
- 2005–2008: Niigata Albirex BB
- 2008–2009: Takamatsu Five Arrows

Coaching
- 2009–2011: JSerra Catholic HS (assistant)
- 2011–2013: Niigata Albirex BB

Career highlights
- 2× bj league 3 point contest winner (2007, 2008); won back to back NBL titles with the Adelaide 36ers and Wollongong Hawks. The only player in league history to do so with different teams

Matt Garrison (born July 5, 1973) is an American basketball coach, formally head coach of the Niigata Albirex BB in the Japanese Bj League.

== Head coaching record ==
Legend
Regular season	G	Games coached	W	Games won	L	Games lost	W–L %	Win–loss %
Playoffs	PG	Playoff games	PW	Playoff wins	PL	Playoff losses	PW–L %	Playoff win–loss %

Team	Year	G	W	L	W–L%	Finish	PG	PW	PL	PW–L%	Result
Niigata Albirex BB	2011–12	52	28	24	.538	4th in Eastern	5	3	2	.600	Lost in 2nd round
Niigata Albirex BB	2012–13	52	36	16	.692	1st in Eastern	4	2	2	.500	4th
