= Shigehiro Taguchi =

Japanese basketball player

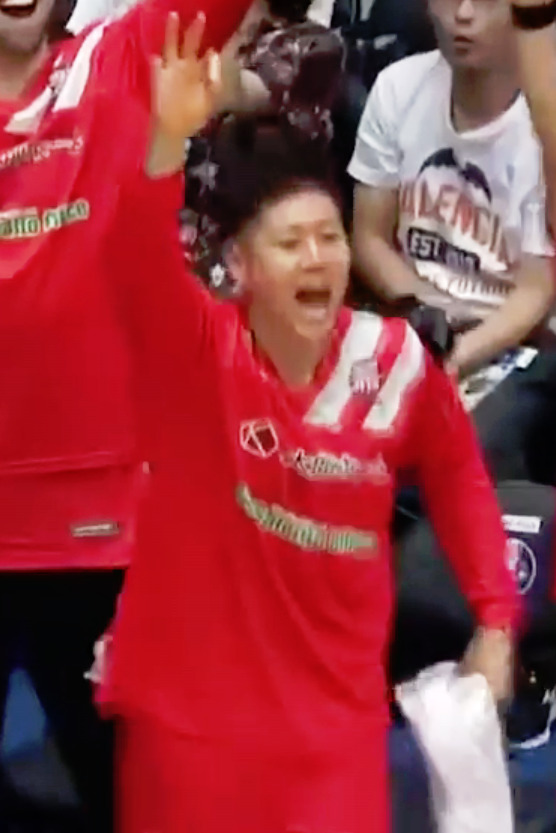
- Taguchi in 2019

No. 5 – Akita Northern Happinets
- Position: Shooting guard
- League: B.League

Personal information
- Born: March 25, 1990 (age 36) Kakunodate, Akita, Japan
- Listed height: 6 ft 1 in (1.85 m)
- Listed weight: 185 lb (84 kg)

Career information
- High school: Meio (Akita, Japan)
- College: Fuji University (2008–2012)
- Playing career: 2012–present

Career history
- 2012–2018: Akita Northern Happinets
- 2018–2021: Chiba Jets Funabashi
- 2021-present: Akita Northern Happinets

Career highlights
- B2 MVP (2018); B.League 3 Point Contest Winner (2017); 2× B.League All-Star (2016, 2018); bj league Best Five (2015); 4× bj league All-Star (2012–2016); 2× bj league 3 Point Contest Winner

Shigehiro Taguchi (田口成浩, born March 25, 1990), nicknamed Shige, is a Japanese professional basketball player for the Akita Northern Happinets of the B.League in Japan. He is a native of Akita prefecture and the most popular player in the "Republic of Pink". He might be the B.League's best current 3-point shooter, and has won the 3 point contest three times. Taguchi was a new captain of Happinets in 2016.

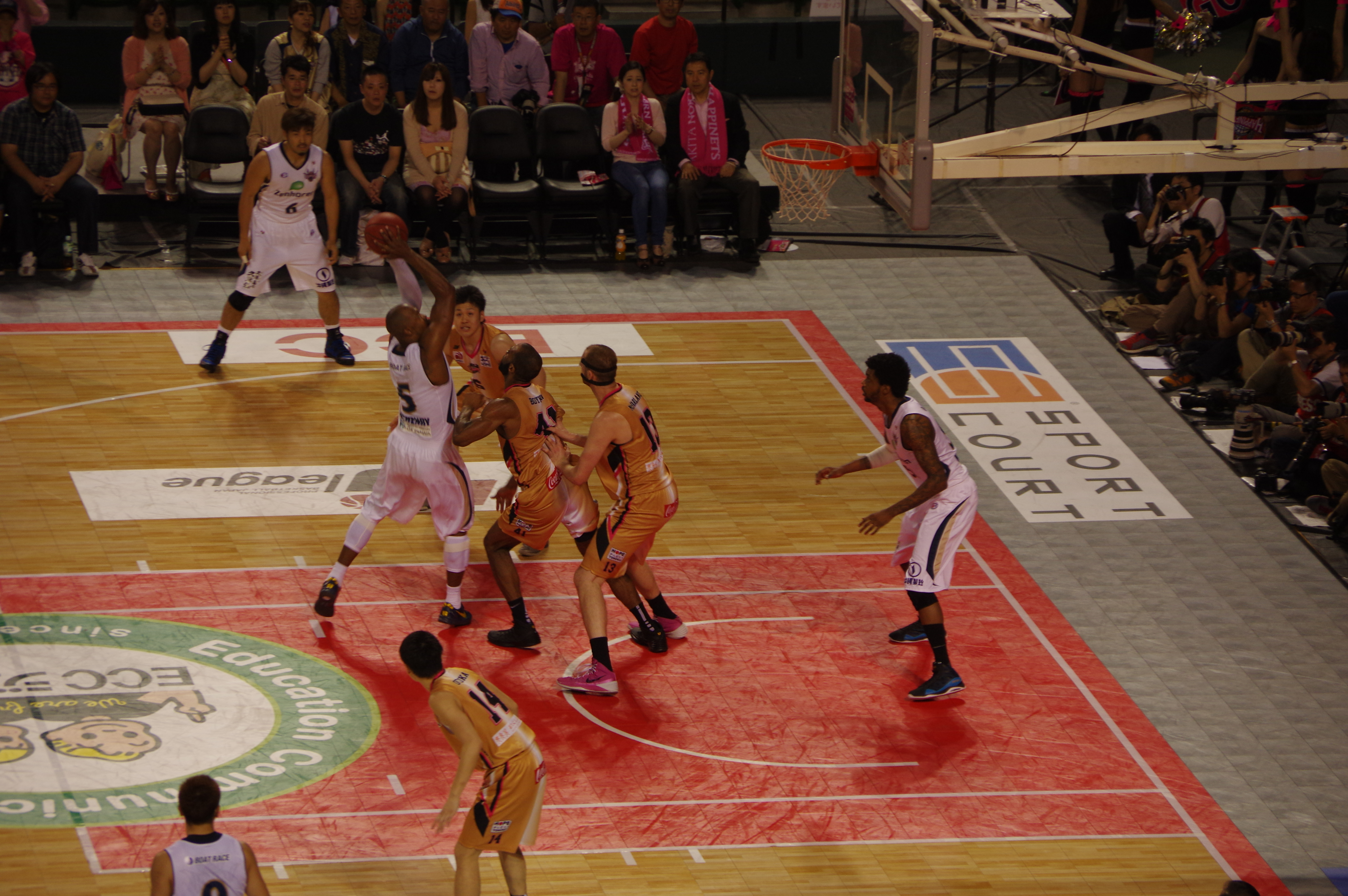
Taguchi playing "Kazu" defence

== Career statistics ==
Legend
GP	Games played	GS	Games started	MPG	Minutes per game
FG%	Field goal percentage	3P%	3-point field goal percentage	FT%	Free throw percentage
RPG	Rebounds per game	APG	Assists per game	SPG	Steals per game
BPG	Blocks per game	PPG	Points per game	**Bold**	Career high

*	Led the league

=== Regular season ===
Year	Team	GP	GS	MPG	FG%	3P%	FT%	RPG	APG	SPG	BPG	PPG
bj League 2011-12	Akita	14	1	11.6	43.6	39.2	52.9	1.4	0.4	0.3	0	5.5
bj League 2012-13	Akita	52	25	25.3	40.2	36.6	73.2	3.1	1.0	0.8	0.1	10.3
bj League 2013-14	Akita	52	47	26.3	46.8	**44.5**	76.6	2.9	1.1	0.9	0.1	11.7
bj League 2014-15	Akita	52	52	30.7	**46.9**	42.5	86.7	3.5	2.0	0.9	0.2	**16.3**
bj League 2015-16	Akita	52	52	31.1	43.7	37.3	**90.1**	**4.4**	2.9	**1.1**	**0.3**	14.6
B League 2016-17	Akita	**60**	**60**	**32.4**	40.8	39.1	82.4	4.1	1.1	0.9	0.1	11.5
B League 2017-18	Akita	**60**	40	25.5	44.8	42.7	88.7	2.5	**3.2**	**1.1**	0.1	11.7
2018-19	Chiba Jets	59	1	15.0	43.9	**44.5**	79.4	1.3	0.8	0.4	0.1	5.1
2019-20	Chiba Jets	40	40	21.9	42.8	40.0	84.4	1.6	1.6	0.8	0.1	6.4
2020-21	Chiba jets	56	2	9.4	29.4	25.9	76.2	0.64	0.64	0.32	0.05	2.30

=== Playoffs ===
Year	Team	GP	GS	MPG	FG%	3P%	FT%	RPG	APG	SPG	BPG	PPG
2013-14	Akita	6	6	32.00	.425	.450	.833	3.5	0.0	1.17	0	8.0
2017-18	Akita	5	4	22.40	.447	.440	1.000	2.0	2.8	0.6	0.2	12.0
2018-19	Chiba Jets	5	0	20.45	.552	.583	.909	1.6	1.2	0.0	0.0	11.2

=== Early cup games ===
Year	Team	GP	GS	MPG	FG%	3P%	FT%	RPG	APG	SPG	BPG	PPG
2017	Akita	2	1	21.32	.533	.500	1.000	3.5	3.0	2.0	0	11.5
2018	Chiba Jets	3	1	16.23	.600	.500	.667	0.7	1.3	1.0	0	5.7
2019	Chiba Jets	2	0	13.55	.250	.000	.000	0.5	2.5	0.5	0	1.0

== William Jones Cup ==
Year	Team	GP	GS	MPG	FG%	3P%	FT%	RPG	APG	SPG	BPG	PPG
2016	Japan	7		5	.063	.000	.000	0.7	0.3	0.0	0.0	0.3

== East Asia Super League ==
Year	Team	GP	GS	MPG	FG%	3P%	FT%	RPG	APG	SPG	BPG	PPG
2018	Chiba Jets	2		12.2			.500	2.0	0.5	0.0	0.0	5.5
2019	Chiba Jets	2		19.6			.000	1.0	0.5	1.5	0.0	10.0

== Trivia ==
- His trademark call "Oisa" comes from the festival shout of Kakunodate, Semboku.

== Personal ==
His sister Kiwako Hashimoto also plays basketball.
