= Marcus Session =

American basketball player (born 1981)

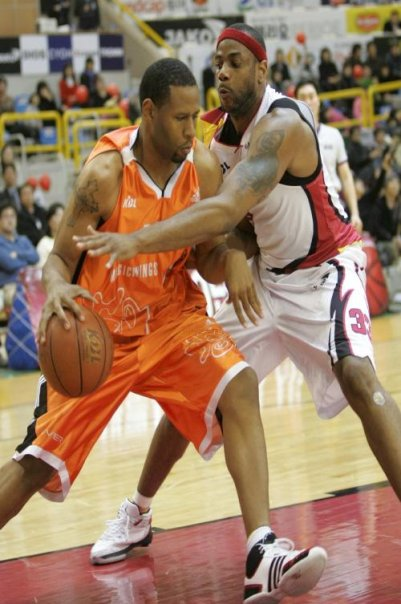
- Born: December 3, 1981 (age 44); Houston, Texas, U.S.
- Education: St. Mary's University, Texas, BS; University of Houston Downtown, BS; Texas Southern University, MS; South Texas College of Law, J.D.
- Years active: College: 2000–2004; Pro: 2004–2012
- Height: 6"6"

Marcus Session is an American former professional basketball player. He was born December 3, 1981, in Houston, Texas. He attended Milby High School, where he played for Coach Boyce Honea. Marcus began his college career at San Jacinto College, where he played for two years. He later went on to attend St. Mary's University, Texas, where he played for coach Buddy Meyer.

== Professional basketball career ==
In professional basketball he started in the pre-season and mini camp with the San Antonio Spurs in 2004. He later played for the Busan KT Sonicboom (S. Korea), Criollos de Caguas (basketball) (Puerto Rico), Espartanos de Margarita (LNB, VEN), Jilin Northeast Tigers (China), Houston Takers (ABA), Deportes Puerto Varas (Chile-DiMayor), Bucaneros De Campeche (MEX-LNBP), tested by Baloncesto Málaga, London Lions (basketball), a short stint with the New Mexico Thunderbirds (NBA D-League), Al Ahli SC (Doha), Rizing Fukuoka (Japan) contractually, TV Langen (Germany).

== Legal career ==
Marcus Session currently works as an attorney in the practice of immigration and personal injury law. He also started a YouTube channel called "Attorney Session Reacts" where he produces educational videos mainly focusing on police interactions with the general public.

== Other work ==
He previously as an international Pro Basketball Scout with Kingdom Works Sports Agency and as an educator, author, and public speaker. In March 2016, Marcus released his first book entitled Working With The At-Risk Teen. His second book, Mila's First Day, is the first installment of a children's book series created after his daughter. He has recorded a Christian Rap Album in 2008 entitled Motivation under the stage name M-Session. He has also spoken at many basketball camps, clinics, schools, and youth events around the world. In 2020, Marcus began his career in public radio as co-host for the show "OneVoice", and currently for the news and public affairs show "Impact Houston Live" which airs on KTSU 90.9 in Houston, a public radio station based at Texas Southern University.
