= Anthony McHenry =

American professional basketball player (born 1983)

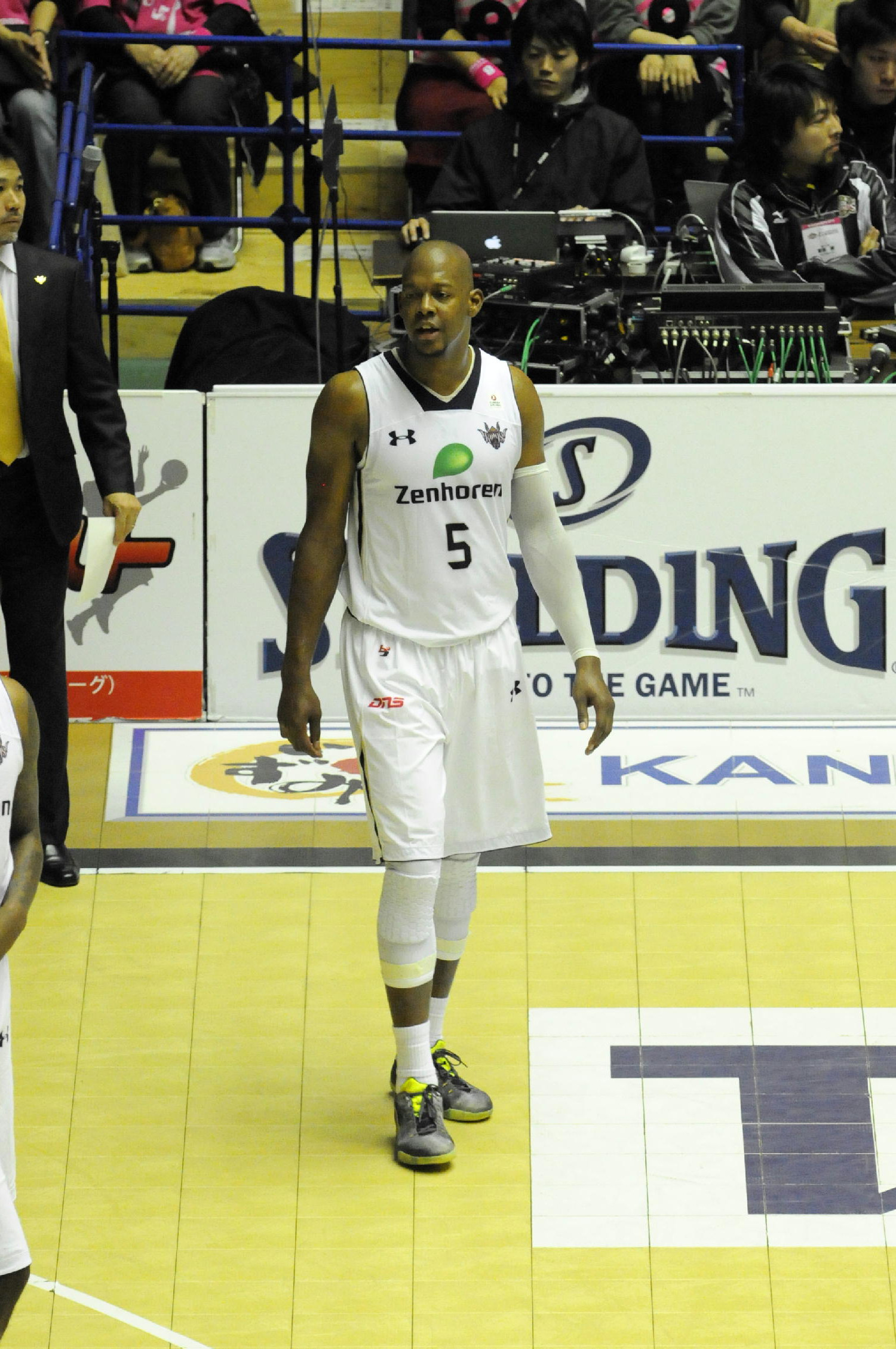
- McHenry with Ryukyu Golden Kings

Ryukyu Golden Kings
- Title: Associate Head Coach
- League: B.League

Personal information
- Born: April 16, 1983 (age 43) Birmingham, Alabama
- Listed height: 6 ft 7 in (2.01 m)
- Listed weight: 225 lb (102 kg)

Career information
- High school: Woodlawn (Birmingham, Alabama)
- College: Georgia Tech (2001–2005)
- NBA draft: 2005: undrafted
- Playing career: 2005–2023
- Position: Small forward
- Coaching career: 2023–present

Career history

Playing
- 2005–2006: Leicester Riders
- 2006–2007: Fort Worth Flyers
- 2008–2017: Ryukyu Golden Kings
- 2017–2023: Shinshu Brave Warriors

Coaching
- 2023–2026: Ryukyu Golden Kings (assistant coach)
- 2026–present: Ryukyu Golden Kings (associate head coach)

Career highlights
- 4× Japanese League champion (2009, 2012, 2014, 2016); B2 League champion (2019); Japanese League MVP (2013); 2× bj League Best Five

Anthony Duane McHenry (born April 16, 1983) is an American professional basketball coach and former player who is the associate head coach for the Ryukyu Golden Kings of the B.League.

The 6 ft 8 in (201 cm) forward who was born in Birmingham, Alabama and graduated from Georgia Tech in August 2008, previously played for Leicester Riders in the British Basketball League (2005–2006) and the Fort Worth Flyers in the NBA Development League before signing for the Ryukyu Golden Kings in 2008. He took a Graduate assistant job at his alma mater, Georgia Tech in the 2007–08 season.

== Career statistics ==
Legend
GP	Games played	GS	Games started	MPG	Minutes per game
FG%	Field goal percentage	3P%	3-point field goal percentage	FT%	Free throw percentage
RPG	Rebounds per game	APG	Assists per game	SPG	Steals per game
BPG	Blocks per game	PPG	Points per game	**Bold**	Career high

=== Regular season ===
Year	Team	GP	GS	MPG	FG%	3P%	FT%	RPG	APG	SPG	BPG	TO	PPG
2008–09	Ryukyu	49	49	36.3	.450	.336	.562	8.3	4.7	1.5	1.7	3.0	15.5
2009–10	Ryukyu	49	49	36.0	.416	.245	.560	6.7	5.0	1.5	1.4	2.6	12.4
2010–11	Ryukyu	50	45	26.1	.480	.361	.721	6.4	3.1	1.3	1.0	2.0	11.1
2011–12	Ryukyu	52	51	30.1	.465	.362	.706	7.3	2.8	0.9	1.2	2.1	11.9
2012–13	Ryukyu	50	50	32.4	.534	.374	.760	9.7	3.1	2.0	1.1	1.9	16.1
2013–14	Ryukyu	48	47	29.4	.486	.302	.641	7.4	3.2	1.7	1.3	1.9	13.3
2014–15	Ryukyu	51		29.5	.478	.344	.766	7.4	3.3	1.3	1.0	2.1	12.4
2015–16	Ryukyu	50		29.1	.548	.318	.661	8.7	3.6	1.3	1.4	2.0	10.3
2016–17	Ryukyu												
2017–18	Shinshu												
