= Kohei Aoki =

Japanese basketball player (born 1980)

Kohei Aoki 青木康平

Japan national basketball team
- Position: 3x3 skill coach

Personal information
- Born: December 13, 1980 (age 45) Minami-ku, Fukuoka
- Listed height: 5 ft 6 in (1.68 m)
- Listed weight: 165 lb (75 kg)

Career information
- High school: Fukuoka University Ohori High School (Fukuoka, Fukuoka)
- College: Senshu University
- Playing career: 2005–present

Career history
- 2005-2011: Tokyo Apache
- 2011-2012: Osaka Evessa
- 2012-2013: Tokyo Cinq Reves
- 2013-2016: Rizing Fukuoka
- 2013: Japan national 3x3 team

Career highlights
- 6x bj league Free throw % leader; 2x bj league Best 5; 8x bj league All-star

Kohei Aoki (born December 13, 1980), nicknamed Cohey, is a Japanese former professional basketball player who last played for Rizing Fukuoka of the bj League in Japan. He played college basketball for Senshu University.

== Career statistics ==
Born in Minami Ward, Fukuoka City, Fukuoka Prefecture. Entered Nishi Nagasumi Elementary School in Fukuoka City, and at the end of the 3rd grade, started playing mini-basketball at the invitation of a friend and participated in a national tournament. In junior high school, he entered Nagaoka Junior High School in Fukuoka City, a strong school, and participated in national tournaments. In high school, he entered Fukuoka University Ohori High School, one of the most prestigious high schools in Japan, where he was in the top 4 at the Inter-High School Championships as a freshman, 4th at the National Athletic Meet in the same year, and in the Winter Cup, where he was in the top 16. They lost to Hokuriku High School in the first round.

Legend
GP	Games played	GS	Games started	MPG	Minutes per game
FG%	Field goal percentage	3P%	3-point field goal percentage	FT%	Free throw percentage
RPG	Rebounds per game	APG	Assists per game	SPG	Steals per game
BPG	Blocks per game	PPG	Points per game	**Bold**	Career high

=== Regular season ===
Year	Team	GP	GS	MPG	FG%	3P%	FT%	RPG	APG	SPG	BPG	TO	PPG
2005–06	Apache	33	7	20.0	.434	.380	.879	2.1	1.9	1.1	.0	1.0	6.6
2006–07	Apache	40	27	28.1	.394	.331	.933	2.3	2.5	1.4	.0	2.1	12.3
2007–08	Apache	42	27	29.1	.425	.400	.895	1.6	3.2	1.1	.0	2.2	15.8
2008–09	Apache	51	10	27.8	.399	.344	.914	1.6	2.8	1.0	.0	1.8	13.3
2009–10	Apache	52	45	32.7	.425	.365	.876	1.9	2.9	1.2	.0	2.3	15.2
2010–11	Apache	32	31	31.5	.468	.382	.797	1.8	2.2	1.0	.0	1.3	12.3
2011–12	Osaka	52	49	29.0	.462	.486	.895	2.1	2.1	0.8	0	1.0	11.6
2012–13	Tokyo CR	49	43	32.8	.445	.433	.889	2.8	2.6	1.1	0	1.7	14.4
2013–14	Fukuoka	52	16	22.4	.480	.436	.856	1.5	1.5	1.0	.1	1.1	9.6
2014–15	Fukuoka	36	32	29.2	.461	.392	.933	1.9	2.2	0.8	.0	1.4	10.8
2015–16	Fukuoka	45	15	23.9	.411	.401	.945	1.7	1.9	0.9	.0	1.2	11.0
