= Tokyo Apache =

- Leagues: bj league
- Founded: 2004
- Dissolved: 2011
- History: 2004–2011
- Arena: Ariake Coliseum (capacity: 10,000); Yoyogi National Gymnasium II (capacity: 3,202)
- Location: Tokyo
- Team colors: Purple and Gold
- President: Chris Hetherington
- Vice-president: Conor Neu
- Head coach: Bob Hill
- Championships: None
- Website: http://www.tokyoapache.com/
Home	Away

Tokyo Apache (東京アパッチ) was a Japanese basketball club, based in the city of Tokyo, Kantō Region. They played in the bj league, the top-level Japanese professional League. Their home games were played at the Yoyogi National Gymnasium II, located at Shibuya, Tokyo.

== History ==
=== Early years (2004–2010) ===
The club was founded in June 2004, but their first season in the bj league, was the 2005–2006 season. The team made the playoffs in the inaugural season topping the Niigata Albirex in the 3rd place game.

On June 1, 2010 the organization was acquired by a subsidiary of Evolution Capital Management, a Los Angeles-based investment management advisor. Conor Neu has been named the Apache's General Manager, while office manager, Daijiro Kusakabe, will continue to face the league for the team.

=== Earthquake and tsunami disaster relief effort ===
After the Great Tohoku quake and subsequent tsunami on March 11, 2011, the Tokyo Apache suspended the remainder of its 2010–2011 season. Tokyo Apache organization and staff then joined forces with Evolution Capital Management and owner Michael Lerch in funding relief projects and organizations. The combined group, which included former NBA star and former Tokyo Apache head coach Joe Bryant and baseball manager Bobby Valentine, contributed over 1 million US dollars to relief project.

=== 2011–2012 season ===
As of June 7, 2011, the team announced that it will be suspending operations for the 2011–2012 season. The suspension is due to an inability to secure business partners and sponsors in the timeframe imposed by the bj-league. The Tokyo Apache management noted that the business climate for securing commitments from both current and new business partners and sponsors deteriorated significantly in the aftermath of the earthquake and tsunami of March 11, 2011. Tokyo Apache committed to continue its disaster relief efforts. As of November 2011, the team was definitely dissolved.

== Honors ==
- bj league
  - Runners-up (2) : 2007/2008, 2008/2009

== Notable players ==
- Kohei Aoki
- Mike Chappell
- Kendall Dartez
- Nick Davis
- John Humphrey
- Reina Itakura
- Robert Swift
- Jeremy Tyler

== Coaches ==
- Joe Bryant
- Motofumi Aoki
- Bob Hill
