= Noshiro City General Gymnasium =

Gymnasium in Noshiro, Japan

Noshiro City Gymnasium
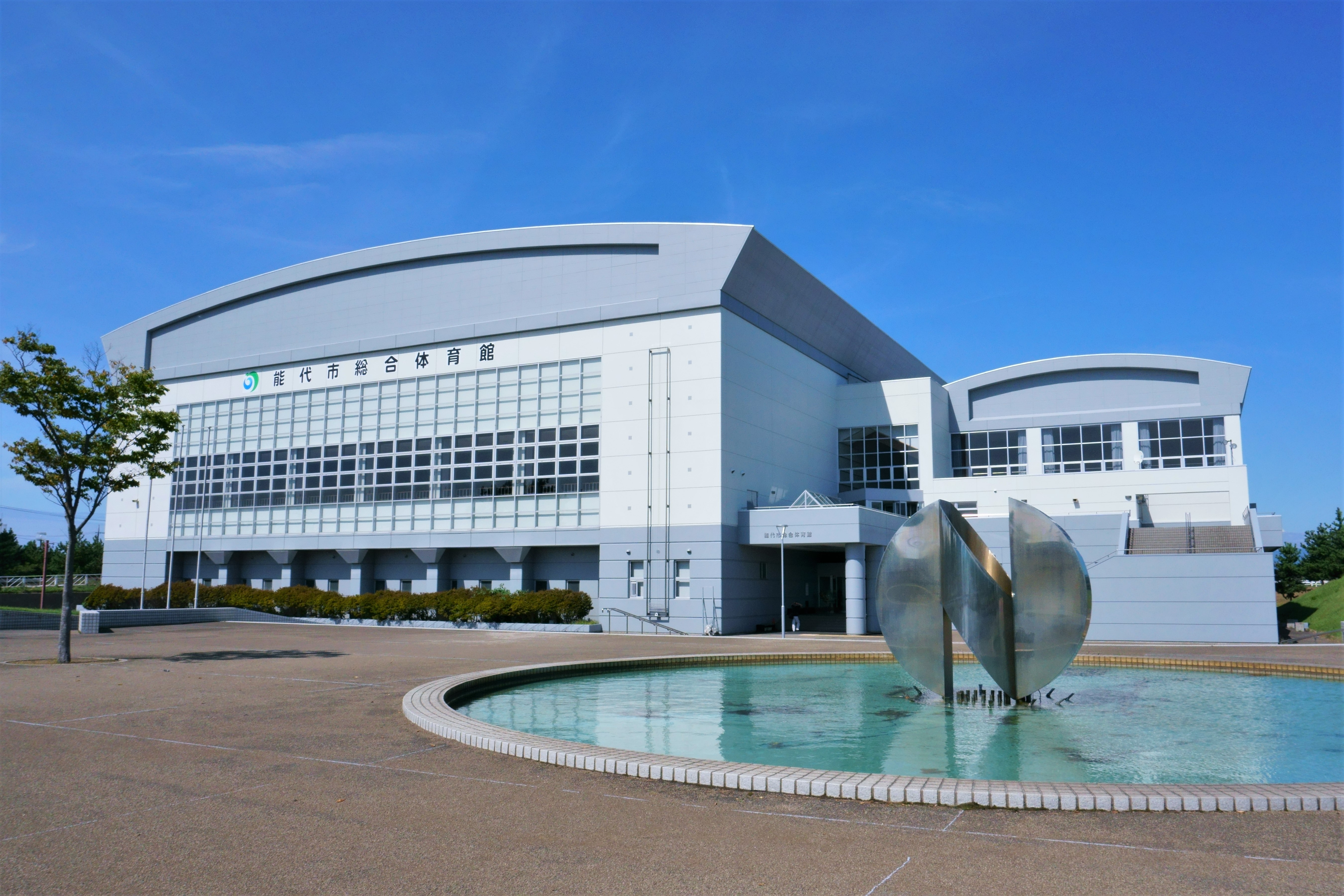

- Location within Akita Prefecture Location within Japan
- Interactive map of Noshiro City Gymnasium
- Full name: Noshiro City General Gymnasium
- Location: 9-53， Omachi, Noshiro, Japan
- Coordinates: 40°12′58.80″N 140°1′35.7″E
- Owner: Noshiro City
- Operator: Noshiro City Sports Association
- Capacity: 2,012

Construction
- Opened: October 17, 1993
- Architect: AXS Satow Inc

Website
- Noshiro City Gymnasium

Noshiro City General Gymnasium is a gymnasium in Noshiro, Japan. It opened in 1993 and holds 2,012 people. Indirect efficient light fixtures are incorporated into the gym. There is no air conditioning in the gym. Noshiro Cup High School Basketball Tournament is a basketball tournament league held during 3–5 May every year at this gymnasium.

== Facilities ==
- Gymnasium - 1,896.96m^{2} (38m×49m)
- Light exercise gymnasium - 633.94m^{2} (33.6m×19.2m)
- Dojo - 245.78m^{2} (15.7m×16m)
- Training room - 141.84m^{2}

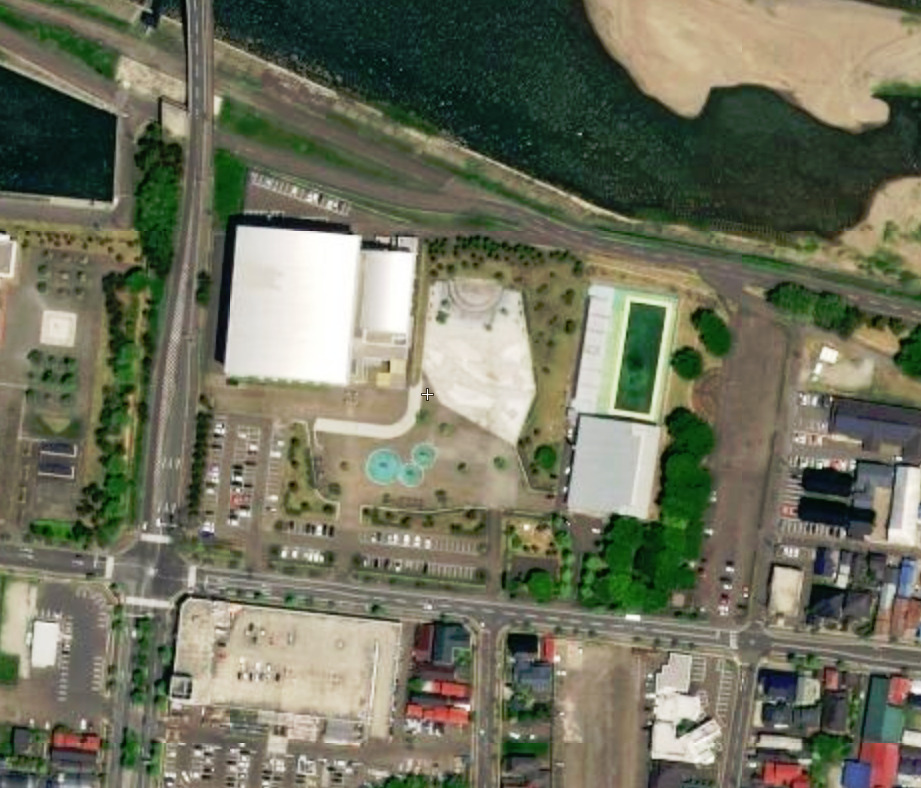
Satellite view

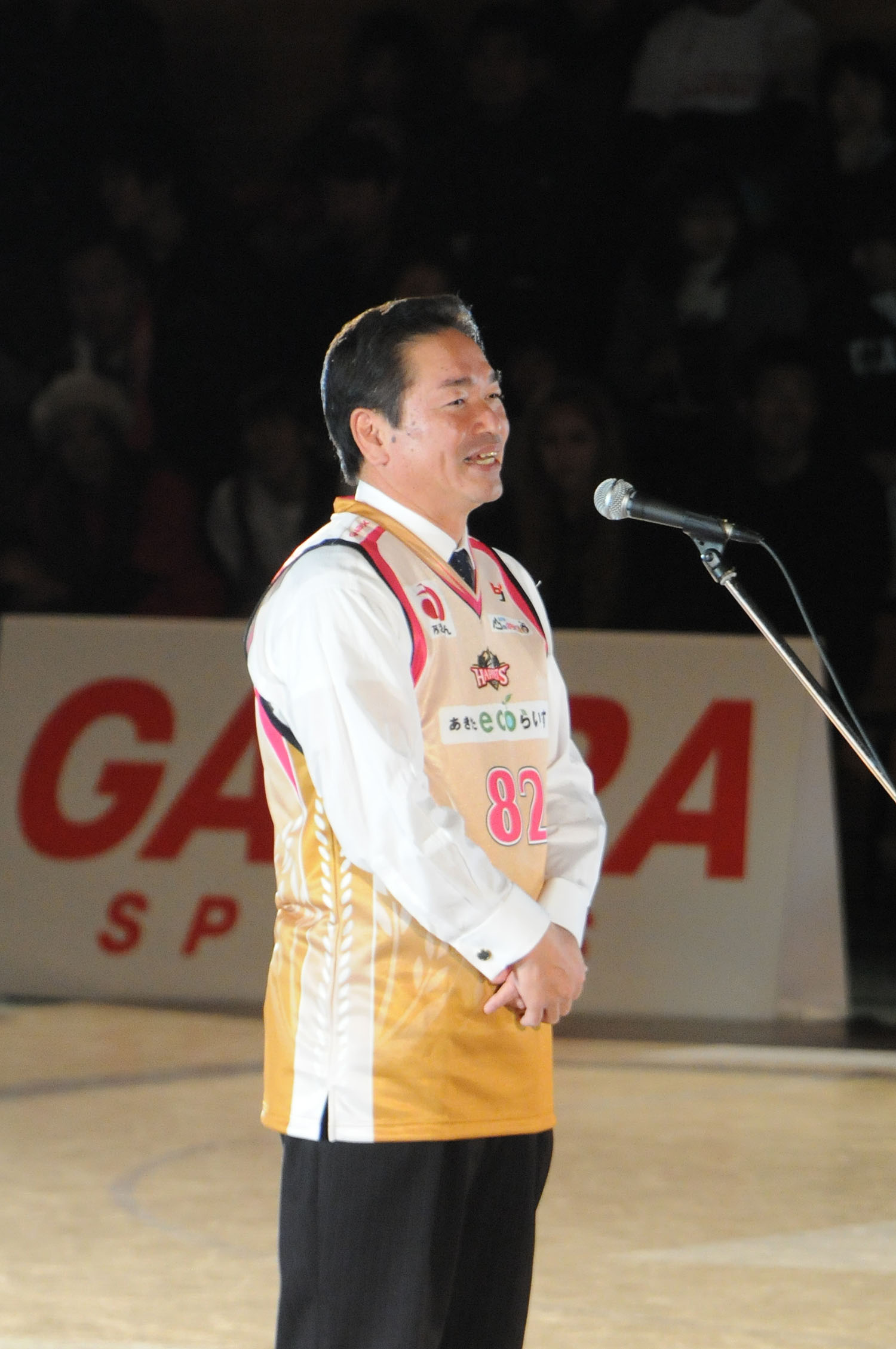
Noshiro Mayor Saitō Shigenobu at the Gymnasium
