= Iizuka Daiichi Gymnasium =

Arena in Iizuka, Fukuoka, Japan

Coordinates: 33°38′24.3″N 130°40′33.5″E

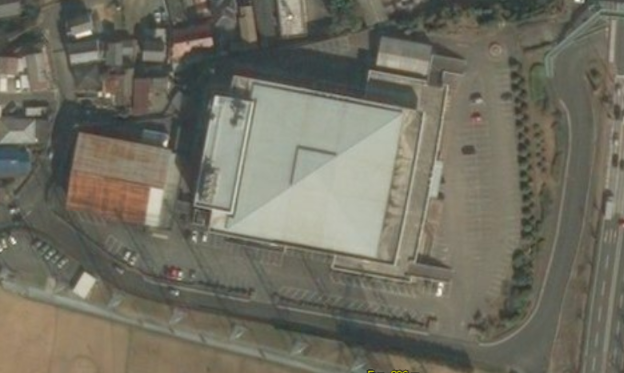
- Interactive map of Iizuka Daiichi Gymnasium
- Full name: Iizuka Daiichi Gymnasium
- Location: Iizuka, Fukuoka, Japan
- Owner: Iizuka city
- Operator: Iizuka city
- Parking: 130 spaces

Construction
- Opened: 1972
- Cost

Website
- http://www.city.iizuka.lg.jp/shisetsu/shisetsu/064.html

Iizuka Daiichi Gymnasium is an arena in Iizuka, Fukuoka, Japan.
