= Michael Gardener (basketball) =

American basketball player (born 1981)

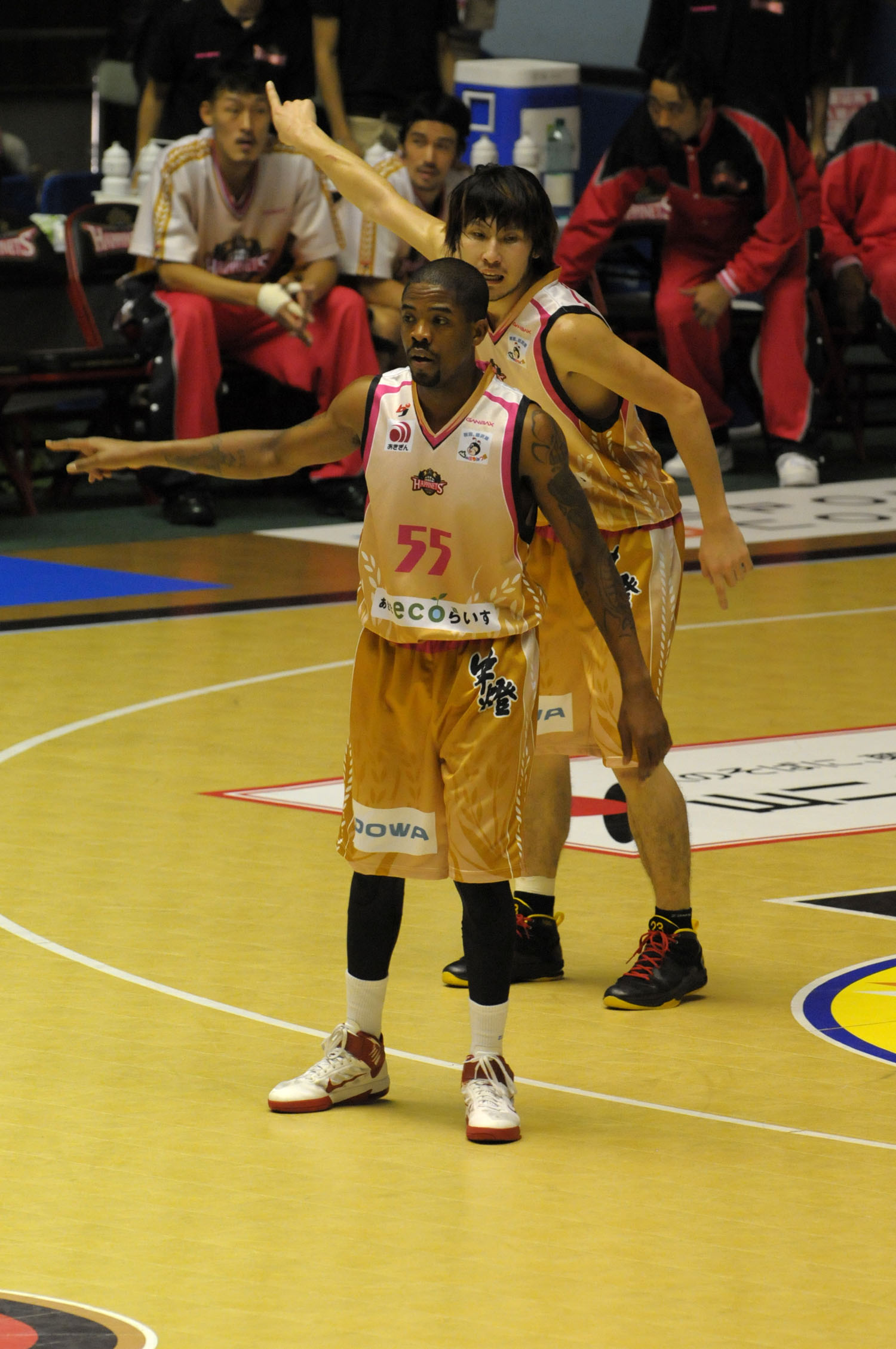
- Gardener at Akita Prefectural Gymnasium

Personal information
- Born: August 27, 1981 (age 44) Detroit, Michigan, U.S.
- Listed height: 183 cm (6 ft 0 in)
- Listed weight: 78 kg (172 lb)

Career information
- College: Texas A&M (2001–2002); Southeastern Louisiana (2002–2004)
- NBA draft: 2004: undrafted
- Playing career: 2004–2011
- Position: Guard
- Number: 55

Career history
- 2005–2006: Canterbury Rams
- 2007–2008: Rizing Fukuoka
- 2008–2009: Hamamatsu Higashimikawa Phoenix
- 2009–2010: Takamatsu Five Arrows
- 2010–2011: Cuxhaven BasCats
- 2011: Akita Northern Happinets

Career highlights
- bj league Best Five (2008–09); 2x bj league Assist Leader (2008–10)

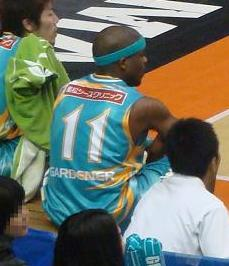
Gardener with Takamatsu

Michael Gardener (born August 27, 1981) is an American former professional basketball player for the Akita Northern Happinets of the Japanese bj league.

== College statistics ==
Year	Team	GP	GS	MPG	FG%	3P%	FT%	RPG	APG	SPG	BPG	PPG
2001–02	Texas A&M	14	11	24.1	.323	.190	.667	2.5	2.6	1.2	0.0	6.9
2002–03	SE Louisiana	22	8	22.0	.279	.231	.515	2.50	3.32	0.95	0.05	3.36
2003–04	SE Louisiana	28	28	34.0	.442	.388	.733	3.18	5.00	1.46	0.07	13.93
Career		65	48	27.9	.397	.323	.689	2.8	3.9	1.2	0.0	8.9

== Career statistics ==
Legend
GP	Games played	GS	Games started	MPG	Minutes per game
FG%	Field goal percentage	3P%	3-point field goal percentage	FT%	Free throw percentage
RPG	Rebounds per game	APG	Assists per game	SPG	Steals per game
BPG	Blocks per game	PPG	Points per game	**Bold**	Career high

Year	Team	GP	GS	MPG	FG%	3P%	FT%	RPG	APG	SPG	BPG	PPG
2007–08	Fukuoka	42		31.8	.404	.313	.607	4.9	4.9	2.1	0.0	18.4
2008–09	Hamamatsu	52	52	32.5	.411	.344	.730	5.4	6.5	2.3	0.1	25.5
2009–10	Takamatsu	44	42	36.7	.369	.290	.669	5.6	7.0	1.7	0.1	21.3
2010–11	Cuxhaven	3		30.7	.432	.467	.692	2.7	4.0	0.7	0.3	16.0
2011–12	Akita	16	16	31	.459	.308	.736	5.8	5.6	1.7	0	19.4
