= Michael Parker (basketball) =

American-born Japanese basketball player

Michael Parker マイケル・パーカー
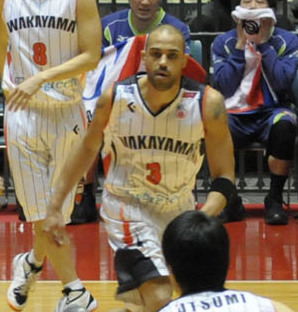

No. 3 – Gunma Crane Thunders
- Position: Power forward
- League: B.League

Personal information
- Born: December 5, 1981 (age 44) Washington, D.C.
- Listed height: 6 ft 7 in (2.01 m)
- Listed weight: 216 lb (98 kg)

Career information
- High school: Clover Park (Lakewood, Washington)
- College: Pierce College (1999–2001); Evergreen State (2001–2003)
- NBA draft: 2003: undrafted
- Playing career: 2003–present

Career history
- 2003–2004: BSC Fürstenfeld Panthers
- 2004–2005: Limerick Lions
- 2005–2007: Bellingham Slam
- 2007–2008: Portland Chinooks
- 2008–2011: Rizing Fukuoka
- 2011–2013: Shimane Susanoo Magic
- 2013–2014: Wakayama Trians
- 2014–2016: Toyota Alvark
- 2016–2020: Chiba Jets
- 2020–2025: Gunma Crane Thunders
- 2025–present: Ehime Orange Vikings

Career highlights
- 2× bj League Best Five (2010, 2011); 5× bj League All-Star; NBL Best Five (2014); NBL All-Star (2013); 4× bj League scoring leader (2008–2012); 5× bj League steals leader (2008–2013); B.League steals leader (2018)

Michael Parker (born December 5, 1981) is an American-born Japanese professional basketball player. He currently plays for the Gunma Crane Thunders of the Japanese B.League.

== Career statistics ==
Legend
GP	Games played	GS	Games started	MPG	Minutes per game
FG%	Field goal percentage	3P%	3-point field goal percentage	FT%	Free throw percentage
RPG	Rebounds per game	APG	Assists per game	SPG	Steals per game
BPG	Blocks per game	PPG	Points per game	**Bold**	Career high

Year	Team	GP	GS	MPG	FG%	3P%	FT%	RPG	APG	SPG	BPG	PPG
2007–08	Fukuoka	27	22	33.7	.601	.242	.587	8.2	1.1	2.6	1.6	17.0
2008–09	Fukuoka	49	49	39.5	.484	.330	.691	12.6	1.8	2.6	2.1	26.8
2009–10	Fukuoka	52	52	40.0	.476	.212	.690	10.9	2.9	2.9	1.7	26.5
2010–11	Fukuoka	50	50	39.3	.561	.262	.705	10.5	2.0	2.3	1.4	27.3
2011–12	Shimane	50	50	38.2	.507	.207	.694	9.9	2.3	2.4	0.9	23.1
2012–13	Shimane	51	51	38.6	.538	.316	.655	10.2	2.1	2.3	1.6	19.5
2013–14	Wakayama	54	54	36.6	.621	.329	.644	12.4	1.6	2.0	2.1	23.1
2014–15	Wakayama/Toyota	48	26	26.0	.575	.232	.614	8.5	1.2	1.8	1.1	14.0
2015–16	Toyota	47	47	25.1	.626	.293	.667	6.4	1.3	1.9	1.2	13.8
2016–17	Chiba	60	60	29.9	.590	.260	.719	8.5	1.2	1.7	1.8	12.6
2017–18	Chiba	60	59	25.3	.641	.258	.574	8.1	1.7	1.9	1.1	12.7

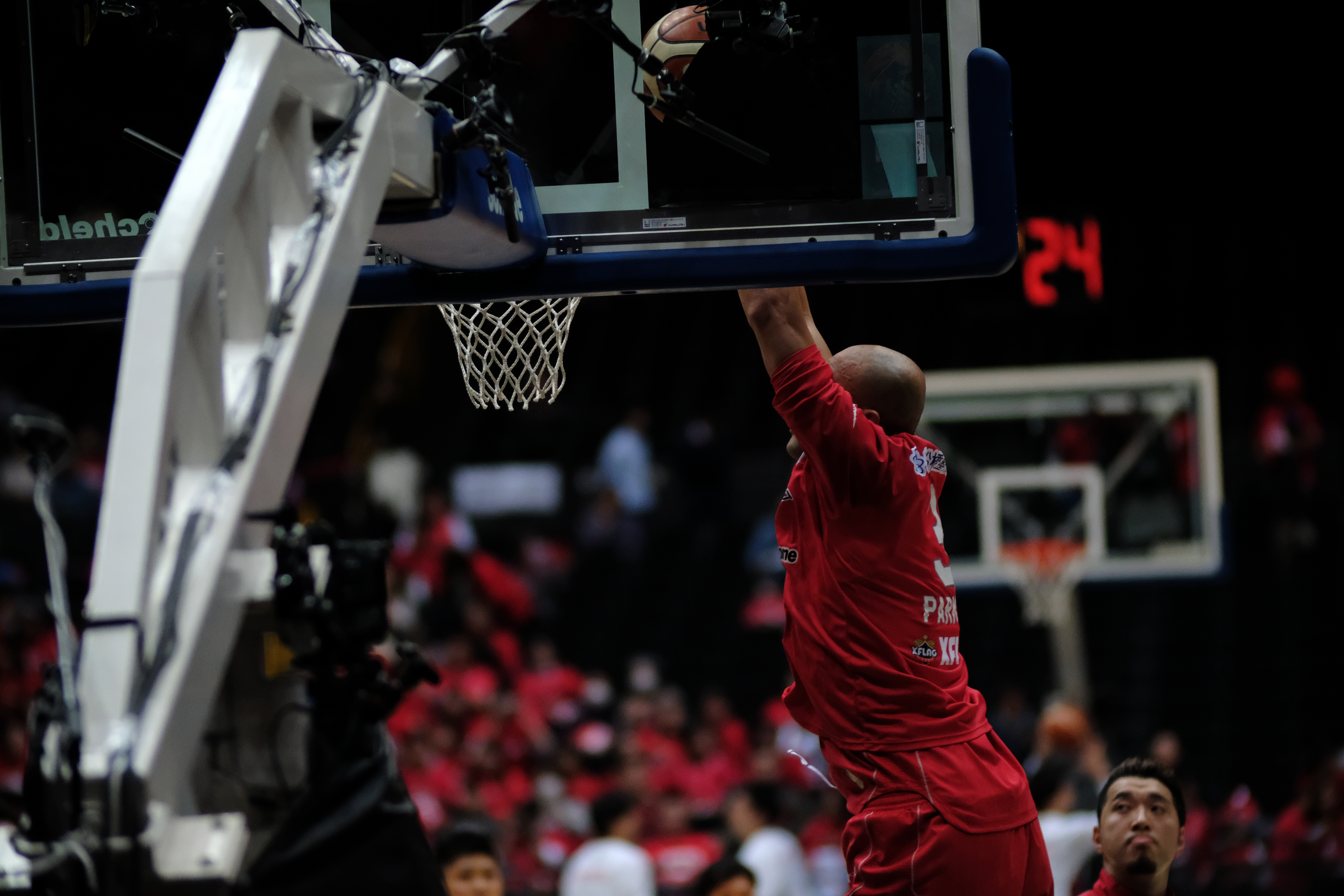
with Chiba in 2019
