= Rizing Zephyr Fukuoka =

Japanese professional basketball team

- Conference: West
- Division: Second
- Leagues: B.League
- Founded: 2005
- History: Fukuoka Red Falcons; 2005–2006; Fukuoka BB Boys; 2006–2007; Rizing Fukuoka; 2007–2016; Rizing Zephyr Fukuoka; 2016–present
- Arena: Teriha Sekisui House Arena
- Capacity: 5,042
- Location: Fukuoka, Fukuoka
- Main sponsor: Abitashion
- President: Yasunori Kanda
- Team manager: Jun Nakanishi
- Head coach: Moncho López
- Championships: B3 Champions (2016–17); B2 Champions (2017–18)
- Conference titles: Western Conference Champions (2012–13)
- Retired numbers: 1 (11)
- Website: r-zephyr.com
Home	Away

The Rizing Zephyr Fukuoka is a Japanese professional basketball team, playing in the second division of the B.League based in Fukuoka. The competes in the B.League One, the second division of the B.League, as a member of the Southern Conference.

== Roster ==
Rizing Zephyr Fukuoka roster
Players
Coaches

Pos.	No.	Nat.	Name
PG	0	(Japan)	Takayuki Kodama
F/C	5	(United States)	Bryce Washington
PG	7	(Japan)	Tomokazu Abe
SF	12	(Japan)	Hayato Kantake
PG	13	(Japan)	Shuki Nakata
F/C	14	(United States)	Gavin Ware
SG	16	(Japan)	Tomohiro Ishii
C	20	(Philippines)	Greg Slaughter
PG	23	(Japan)	Shunto Murakami
SF	24	(Japan)	Hiroki Taniguchi
SF	33	(United States)	Toshikazu Kato
PF	34	(Spain)	Pablo Aguilar
F/C	42	(United States)	Leon Watanabe
CG	88	(Japan)	Shuki Shigetomi

Head coach

(Spain) Moncho López

Assistant coach(es)

(Japan) Taiki Yoshinaga
(Portugal) Isabel Nogueira de Lemos

Legend

- (C) Team captain
- Injured

- Roster
Updated: December 14, 2022

== Notable players ==
Former logo

Note: Flags indicate national team eligibility at FIBA-sanctioned events. Players may hold other non-FIBA nationalities not displayed.

Criteria

To appear in this section a player must have either:

- Set a club record or won an individual award while at the club
- Played at least one official international match for their national team at any time
- Played at least one official NBA match at any time.

- (United Kingdom) Matthew Bryan-Amaning
- (Japan) Kohei Aoki
- (United States) Isaiah Armwood
- (Trinidad and Tobago) Julius Ashby
- (United States) Marlyn Bryant
- (United States) Brian Butch
- (Japan) Haimo Chen
- (United States) Peter Cornell
- (United States) Jermaine Dearman
- (United States) Michael Gardener
- (United States) Jordan Glynn
- (United States) Gary Hamilton
- (Czech Republic) Ivan Höger
- (United States) John Humphrey
- (United States) Eric Jacobsen
- (United States) Zane Johnson
- (Jamaica) Jerome Jordan
- (United States) Cooper Land
- (United States) Bingo Merriex
- (United States) Kevin Palmer
- (Japan) Michael Parker
- (United States) Josh Peppers
- (United States) Corey Santee
- (United States) Marcus Session
- (Japan) Kazuhiro Shoji
- (Philippines) Greg Slaughter
- (Japan) Keisuke Takabatake
- (Japan) Akitomo Takeno
- (United States) Seth Tarver
- (Japan) Rintaro Tokunaga

== Head coaches ==
- Toshihiro Goto
- Carl John Neumann (2007–09)
- Tadaharu Ogawa (2009–12)
- Atsushi Kanazawa (2012–13, 2016–17)
- Mack Tuck (2013)
- Kimitoshi Sano (2013–14)
- James Duncan (2014)
- Ken Hamanaka (2014)
- Joe Bryant (2015)
- Tomohiro Moriyama (2015–16)
- Takatoshi Ishibashi (2016)
- Josep Clarós (2016, 2020–21)
- Kentaro Hori (2017)
- Ryuji Kawai (2017–18)
- Bob Nash (2018–19)
- Iurgi Caminos (2019–20)
- Eiki Umezaki (2021–22)
- Taiki Yoshinaga (2022)
- Moncho López (2022–present)

== Arenas ==
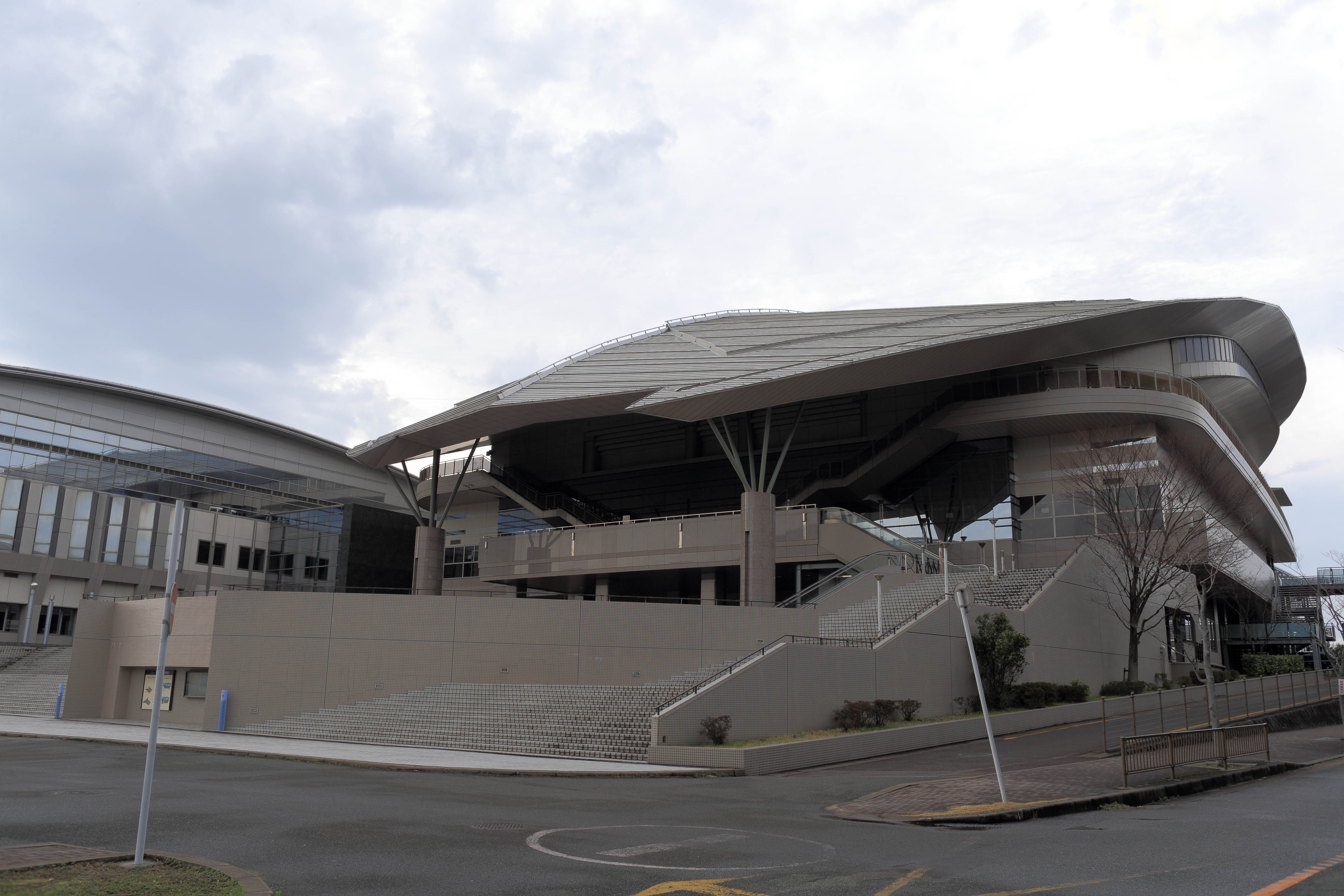
Accions Fukuoka

- Teriha Sekisui House Arena
- Fukuoka Citizens Gymnasium
- Iizuka Daiichi Gymnasium
- Kitakyushu City General Gymnasium
- Kurume Arena
- Okawa Citizens Gymnasium
- Mizuma General Gymnasium
