= San-en NeoPhoenix =

Professional basketball team in Hamamatsu, Shizuoka Prefecture, Japan

- Leagues: B.League
- Founded: 1965; 61 years ago
- History: OSG; OSG Higashimikawa; Hamamatsu Higashimikawa Phoenix; San-en NeoPhoenix
- Arena: Toyohashi City General Gymnasium
- Location: Toyohashi, Aichi
- Team colors: Red, White
- Head coach: Atsushi Ōno
- Championships: 3
- Retired numbers: 1 (3)
- Website: www.neophoenix.jp
Home	Away	Third

The San-en NeoPhoenix (三遠ネオフェニックス, San'en Neofenikkusu) are a Japanese professional basketball team based in Toyohashi, Aichi Prefecture. The team competes in the B.League Premier, the highest division of the B.League, as a member of the Western Conference. The team plays its home games at Toyohashi City General Gymnasium.

== History ==
The team was founded in 1965, as the company team of the OSG Corporation, a Toyokawa-based machine parts manufacturer. It remained a local team in Aichi prefecture until 1995, when it first participated in the All-Japan Professional Basketball Championships. It joined the Japan Basketball League (JBL) in 1999, winning the Second Division championship in 2000.

“Higashimikawa” was added to the team name in 2007, when its home stadium was moved to Toyohashi. It ended the 2007 season in third place.

From 2008, the Higashimikawa Phoenix joined the new bj league, and the following year, “Hamamatsu” was added to the team name to emphasize the compound franchise among Toyohashi, Hamamatsu, and the surrounding districts and the team was legally registered as an independent corporation under the name of “Phoenix Communications”. The team signed the noted Chinese basketball star, Sun Mingming, in 2008.

In July 2015, the team announced its participation in the inaugural season of Japan's professional basketball league which debuted in 2016, competing in the first division. Prior to joining the league, the club accordingly changed its name to "San-en NeoPhoenix", and began playing their home games in Toyohashi.

== Honours ==
- League champions: 3
  - 2009
  - 2010
  - 2015

== Current roster ==
Note: Flags indicate national team eligibility at FIBA-sanctioned events. Players may hold other non-FIBA nationalities not displayed.

San-en NeoPhoenix roster
Players
Coaches

Pos.	No.	Nat.	Name	Ht.	Age
F		(United States)	Vitto Brown	2.03 m (6 ft 8 in)	31 – 13 July 1995
F	1	(United States)	Yante Maten	2.01 m (6 ft 7 in)	30 – 14 August 1996
G	5	(Japan)	Sota Oura	1.82 m (6 ft 0 in)	28 – 23 December 1997
C	8	(Japan)	Atsuya Ota	2.06 m (6 ft 9 in)	42 – 4 June 1984
SF	10	(Japan)	Hirotaka Yoshii
G	11	(Japan)	Hisashi Moriguchi	1.77 m (5 ft 10 in)	27 – 14 September 1999
F	14	(Japan)	Kosuke Kanamaru	1.92 m (6 ft 4 in)	37 – 8 March 1989
F	15	(Japan)	Tatsumi Yu	1.97 m (6 ft 6 in)	25 – 9 July 2001
F/C	23	(United States)	David Dudzinski	2.05 m (6 ft 9 in)	34 – 26 May 1992
G	24	(Japan)	Ryusei Sasaki	1.80 m (5 ft 11 in)	30 – 2 May 1996
G	29	(Japan)	Kazuki Hosokawa	1.87 m (6 ft 2 in)	28 – 17 November 1997
G	32	(Japan)	Morihisa Yamauchi	1.75 m (5 ft 9 in)	36 – 23 March 1990

Head coach

(Japan) Atsushi Ōno

Assistant coach(es)

(Japan) Hiroyuki Maeda
(Japan) Taishiro Shimizu

Legend

- (C) Team captain
- Injured

- Roster
Updated: 24 July 2026

== Notable players ==
To appear in this section a player must have either:

- Set a club record or won an individual award as a professional player.

- Played at least one official international match for his senior national team or one NBA game at any time.

- (Japan) Hirotaka Yoshii
- (United States) Wayne Arnold
- (United States) Damone Brown
- (United States) Josh Childress
- (United States) Mo Charlo
- (United States) Robert Dozier
- (United States) Marquis Estill
- (United States) Kevin Galloway
- (United States) Michael Gardener
- (United States) Jerald Honeycutt
- (United States) Tim James
- (United States) Paul Afeaki Khoury
- (Ukraine) Viacheslav Kravtsov
- (Ivory Coast) Hervé Lamizana
- (United States) Dan Langhi
- (United States) Dior Lowhorn
- (United States) Cartier Martin
- (China) Sun Mingming
- (Canada) Scott Morrison
- (Uganda) Stanley Ocitti
- (Japan) Atsuya Ota
- (United States) Tim Parham
- (United States) Gyno Pomare
- (Philippines) Thirdy Ravena
- (United States) Richard Roby
- (United States) Addison Spruill
- (United States) Deshawn Stephens
- (United States) Jeff Webster
- (United States) Wendell White
- (United States) Terrance Woodbury
- (Germany) Elias Harris

== Coaches ==
- (Japan) Kazuo Nakamura
- (Japan) Ryuji Kawai
- (Japan) Tomoya Higashino
- (Japan) Hiroki Fujita
- (United States) Brian Rowsom
- (Japan) Shuto Kawachi
- (Serbia) Branislav Vićentić
- (Japan) Atsushi Ōno

== Arenas ==
- Toyohashi City General Gymnasium
- Hamamatsu Arena
- Green Arena

== Practice facilities ==
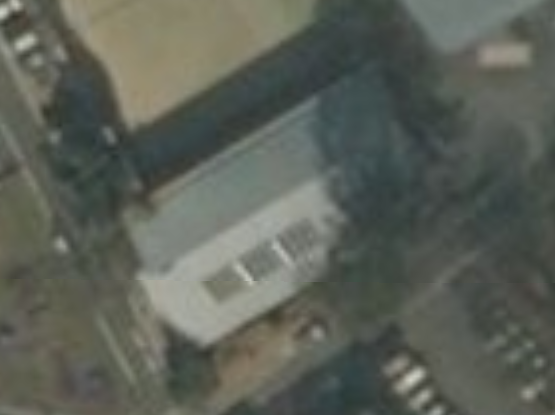
OSG Gymnasium

- OSG Gymnasium
