= 2022–23 B.League season =

- League: B.League
- Season: 2022–23
- Duration: September 29, 2022 – May 28, 2023

B1 Finals
- Champions: Ryukyu Golden Kings
- Runners-up: Chiba Jets

The 2022–23 B.League season was the seventh season of the Japanese B.League.

For the 2022–23 season, the B1 division has 24 teams, and the three-conference system of East, Central, and West was restored for the first time since the 2019–20 season. The B2 division remained a two-conference system with 14 teams, the same as the previous season.

The Ryukyu Golden Kings are this season's champions, after beating the Chiba Jets, 2–0.

== B1 ==
=== Regular season ===
==== West District ====
Pos	Team	Pld	W	L	PF	PA	PD	PCT	Qualification or relegation
1	Ryukyu Golden Kings	60	48	12	4870	4407	+463	.800	Advanced to the playoffs
2	Shimane Susanoo Magic	60	48	12	5008	4526	+482	.800	Advanced to the playoffs
3	Nagoya Diamond Dolphins	60	43	17	5041	4543	+498	.717	Qualified for the playoffs via wildcard
4	Hiroshima Dragonflies	59	41	18	4959	4627	+332	.695	Qualified for the playoffs via wildcard
5	Osaka Evessa	60	27	33	4649	4757	−108	.450	
6	Fighting Eagles Nagoya	60	22	38	4411	4685	−274	.367	
7	Kyoto Hannaryz	60	22	38	4627	4858	−231	.367	
8	Shiga Lakestars	60	14	46	4563	5089	−526	.233	

Source: Standings

==== East District ====
Pos	Team	Pld	W	L	PF	PA	PD	PCT	Qualification or relegation
1	Chiba Jets	60	53	7	5275	4487	+788	.883	Advanced to the playoffs
2	Alvark Tokyo	60	42	18	4635	4262	+373	.700	Advanced to the playoffs
3	Utsunomiya Brex	60	32	28	4420	4324	+96	.533	
4	Akita Northern Happinets	60	29	31	4715	4664	+51	.483	
5	Gunma Crane Thunders	60	29	31	4900	4992	−92	.483	
6	Ibaraki Robots	60	23	37	4822	4917	−95	.383	
7	Levanga Hokkaido	60	19	41	4845	5288	−443	.317	
8	Sendai 89ers	60	19	41	4392	4672	−280	.317	

Source: Standings

==== Central District ====
Pos	Team	Pld	W	L	PF	PA	PD	PCT	Qualification or relegation
1	Kawasaki Brave Thunders	60	40	20	4952	4677	+275	.667	Advanced to the playoffs
2	Yokohama B-Corsairs	60	33	27	4934	4744	+190	.550	Advanced to the playoffs
3	Shinshu Brave Warriors	59	29	30	4430	4330	+100	.492	
4	Sun Rockers Shibuya	60	28	32	4962	5109	−147	.467	
5	SeaHorses Mikawa	60	27	33	4652	4758	−106	.450	
6	San-en NeoPhoenix	60	23	37	4725	4914	−189	.383	
7	Toyama Grouses	60	15	45	4730	5189	−459	.250	
8	Niigata Albirex BB	60	13	47	4514	5212	−698	.217	

Source: Standings

=== Playoffs ===
All matches in the playoffs were in a best-of-three series.

Quarter-finals
Chiba Jets	2
Hiroshima Dragonflies	1
Shimane Susanoo Magic	1
Alvark Tokyo	2
Ryukyu Golden Kings	2
Nagoya Diamond Dolphins	0
Kawasaki Brave Thunders	0
Yokohama B-Corsairs	2

Semi-finals
Chiba Jets	2
Alvark Tokyo	0
Ryukyu Golden Kings	2
Yokohama B-Corsairs	0

Finals
Chiba Jets	0
Ryukyu Golden Kings	2

== B1 Individual statistic leaders ==
Category	Player	Team	Statistic
Points per game	(United Kingdom) Myles Hesson	Toyama Grouses	22.8
Rebounds per game	(United States) Nigel Spikes	Toyama Grouses	14.0
Assists per game	(Japan) Yuki Kawamura	Yokohama B-Corsairs	8.44
Steals per game	(United States) Jeremy Jones	Nagoya Fighting Eagles	2.13
Blocks per game	(United States) Kyle O'Quinn	San-en NeoPhoenix	1.83
FG%	(United States) Joshua Smith (basketball)	Toyama Grouses	73.42%
3FG%	(Japan) Hiromu Kitagawa	Shimane Susanoo Magic	48.15%
FT%	(Japan) Hikaru Futagami (United States) Draelon Burns	Chiba Jets; Shinshu Brave Warriors	100%

== B2 ==
=== Regular season ===
East District

West District
