= Yudai Baba =

Japanese basketball player (born 1995)

Yudai Baba 馬場 雄大
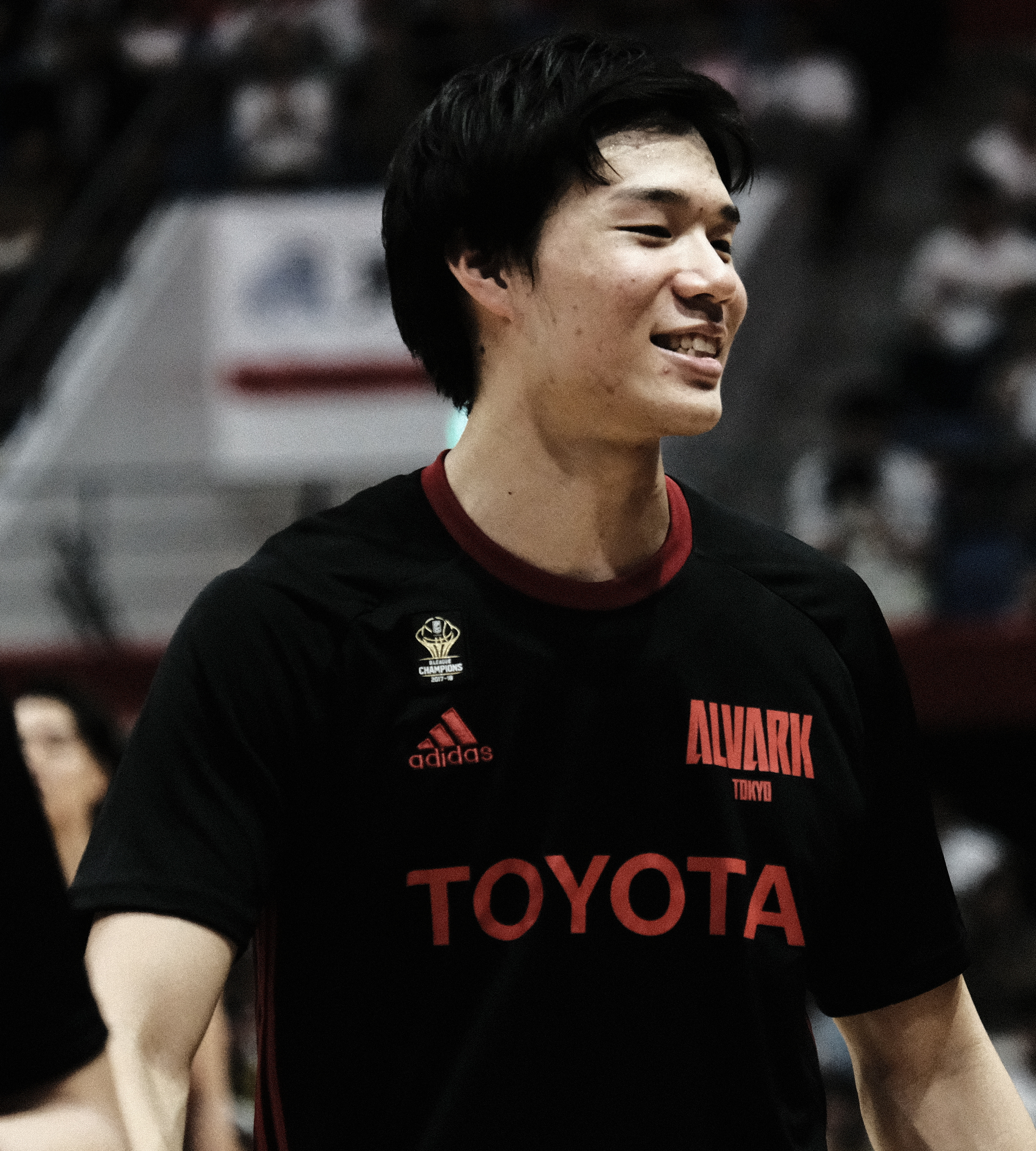
- Baba with Alvark Tokyo in 2018

No. 18 – Nagasaki Velca
- Position: Shooting guard
- League: B.League

Personal information
- Born: 7 November 1995 (age 31) Toyama, Japan
- Listed height: 6 ft 5 in (1.96 m)
- Listed weight: 198 lb (90 kg)

Career information
- High school: Toyama Daiichi (Toyama, Toyama)
- College: University of Tsukuba
- NBA draft: 2017: undrafted
- Playing career: 2017–present

Career history
- 2017–2019: Alvark Tokyo
- 2019–2020: Texas Legends
- 2020–2021: Melbourne United
- 2021–2022: Texas Legends
- 2022: Melbourne United
- 2022–2023: Texas Legends
- 2023–present: Nagasaki Velca

Career highlights
- NBL champion (2021); B.League Final MVP (2019); 2× B.League champion (2018, 2019)
- Stats at Basketball Reference

Yudai Baba (馬場 雄大, Baba Yūdai; born 7 November 1995) is a Japanese professional basketball player for Nagasaki Velca of the B.League. He played college basketball for the University of Tsukuba. Baba has been a member of the Japan men's national basketball team.

== High school career ==
Baba played at Toyama Daiichi High School where his father, Toshiharu Baba, was the head coach at that time.

== College career ==
Baba played for the men's basketball team of the University of Tsukuba. In 2015, he was a part of the team that won the 67th All Japan Intercollegiate Basketball Championship. In 2016, Baba, along with teammate Shusuke Ikuhara, received the best player award as Tsukuba won the 68th All Japan Intercollegiate Basketball Championship for the third time in a row.

== Professional career ==
=== Alvark Tokyo (2017–2019) ===
On 30 June 2017, Baba joined the Alvark Tokyo of the B.League. On 17 November, he scored a career-high 22 points on 50 percent shooting from the field, to go along with seven rebounds, two assists, a steal and a block across 27 minutes in an 81–76 loss to Levanga Hokkaido. On 24 December, Baba had 14 points and a career-high three blocks in a 62–60 loss to the Hitachi Sun Rockers. Baba helped Tokyo defeat the Chiba Jets Funabashi to claim their first B.League championship title, tallying 14 points and three steals in the final game. Following his impressive debut season, Baba was named Newcomer of the Year.

On 17 October 2018, Baba scored nine points, grabbed four rebounds, dished out a career-high 10 assists and tacked on three steals in a 79–74 loss to Link Tochigi Brex. On 23 December, Baba had 21 points, three rebounds and five assists in a 69–68 victory against the Yokohama B-Corsairs. He recorded a career-high in playing efficiency rating with 28. On 1 February 2019, he grabbed a career-high nine rebounds versus the Fukuoka Rizing. On 30 March, Baba had a career-high six steals in a win against the Akita Northern Happinets. Baba led Tokyo to back-to-back championship titles. He was eventually named B.League Final MVP, after logging 12 points, 12 rebounds, six assists and two steals in the final game against the Chiba Jets Funabashi. Baba was also named the season's Best Sixth Man.

=== Texas Legends (2019–2020) ===
On 19 September 2019, Baba signed with the Dallas Mavericks of the National Basketball Association (NBA). On 12 October, he was waived by the Mavericks. On 26 October, Baba was included in the training camp roster of the Texas Legends, the G League affiliate of the Mavericks. He was later included in the opening night roster of the Legends. In the G League, Baba played in 41 games, averaging 6.3 points, 2.5 rebounds, 1.3 assists and 1.0 steals in 19.6 minutes per game.

For his efforts of becoming the first Japanese player to make it from the B.League to the NBA, Baba was given the B.League's Break the Border award.

=== Melbourne United (2020–2021) ===
On 19 July 2020, Baba signed with Melbourne United of the Australian National Basketball League (NBL). On 22 February 2021, Baba posted an NBL career-high 17 points, four rebounds and three assists in an 88–81 win over the Cairns Taipans. Baba helped the United return to the NBL Grand Final, where they faced the defending champions, the Perth Wildcats. In Game 2, Baba scored 15 points, grabbed four rebounds and dished out one assist in an 83–74 win, helping the team take a 2–0 series lead. In Game 3, he tallied 11 points, two rebounds and an assist, helping the United win the NBL championship title. Baba was named Melbourne United Defensive Player of the Year for tallying 31 steals and nine blocks across the season. He was also the recipient of the club's SHARE Award, an honor that is voted on by the playing group after each game that goes to the player who best upholds the squad's values.

=== Return to Texas (2021–2022) ===
On 22 October 2021, Baba signed with the Texas Legends of the NBA G League, reuniting him with his former team. On 23 December, Baba announced that he tested positive for COVID-19 and would be sidelined for 4 to 6 weeks.

=== Return to Melbourne (2022) ===
On 23 March 2022, Baba signed with Melbourne United for the 2021–22 NBL season.

=== Third stint with Texas Legends (2022–2023) ===
On 3 November 2022, Baba was named to the opening night roster for the Texas Legends.

== National team career ==
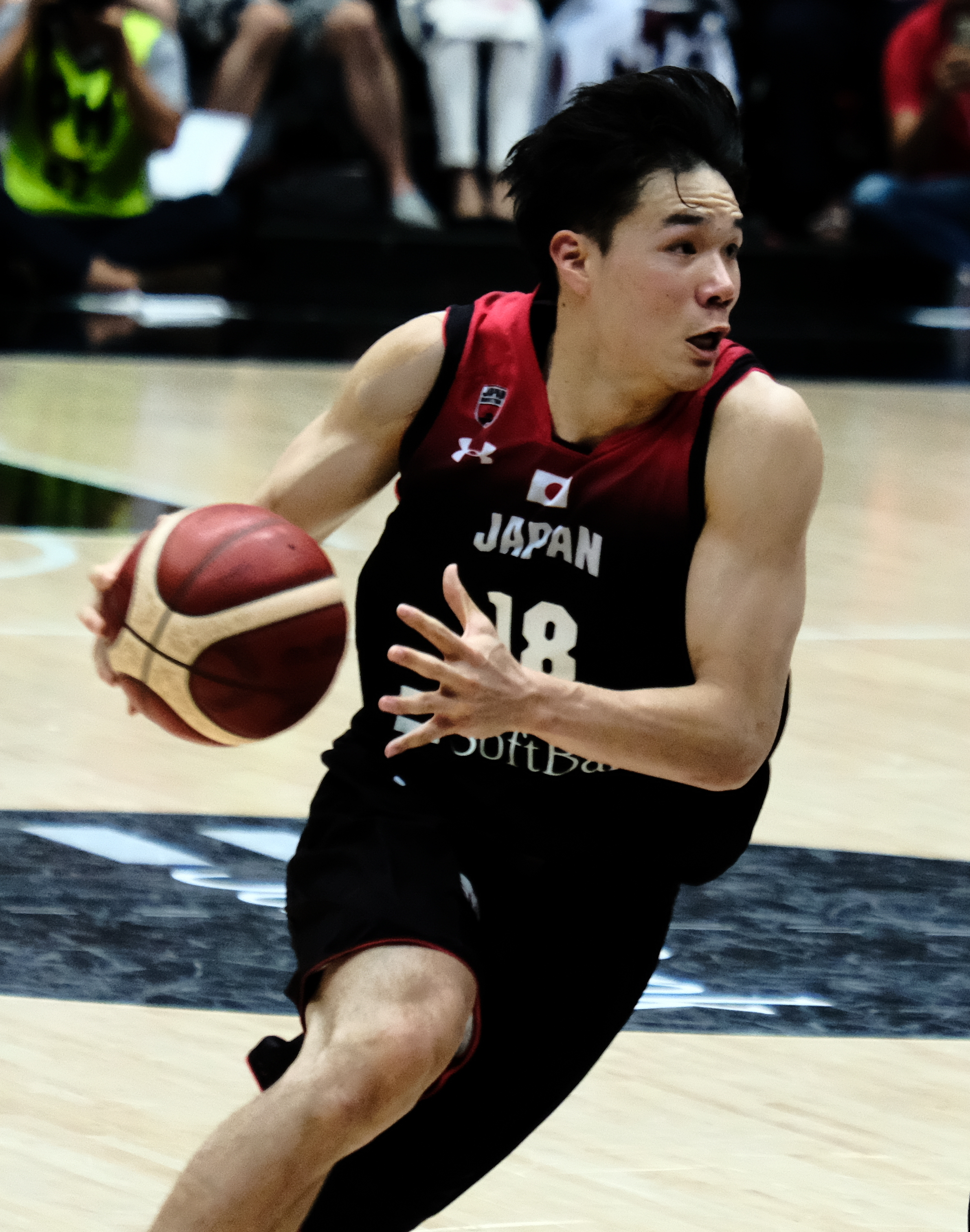
Baba with the national team in 2019

Baba has played for the Japanese national team. At the 2017 FIBA Asia Cup, Baba averaged 5.5 points, 1.5 rebounds, 2.3 assists and 1.5 steals per game. He was also Japan's best free throw shooter with 100 percent free throw percentage. At the 2019 FIBA World Cup Asian Qualifiers, he logged an average of 8.4 points, 3.6 rebounds, 2.0 assists and 1.4 steals per game. Baba was also a member of the national team that competed at the 2019 FIBA Basketball World Cup. His tournament highlights included a team-high 18-point and 3-steal outing in a 98–45 loss to USA, outperforming Japanese NBA players Rui Hachimura and Yuta Watanabe who had four and nine points, respectively. Baba played in all five games, averaging 9.2 points, 2.6 rebounds, 3.0 assists and 1.4 steals.

== Player profile ==
Baba is known for his signature move, a slam dunk dubbed "Baba Boom" by the media and fans. NBL commentator and former player Corey "Homicide" Williams gave Baba the moniker "Tokyo Drift" for his speed.

== Personal life ==
On 1 July 2021, Baba announced on Twitter and Instagram his marriage to Japanese actress Kanna Mori.

Baba's father, Toshiharu Baba, played for Japan's national team from the 1970s until the 80s.

Baba attended the School of Health and Physical Education during his time at the University of Tsukuba.
