= Chikuma City Togura Gymnasium =

Arena in Chikuma, Nagano, Japan

Coordinates: 36°28′41″N 138°9′12.1″E

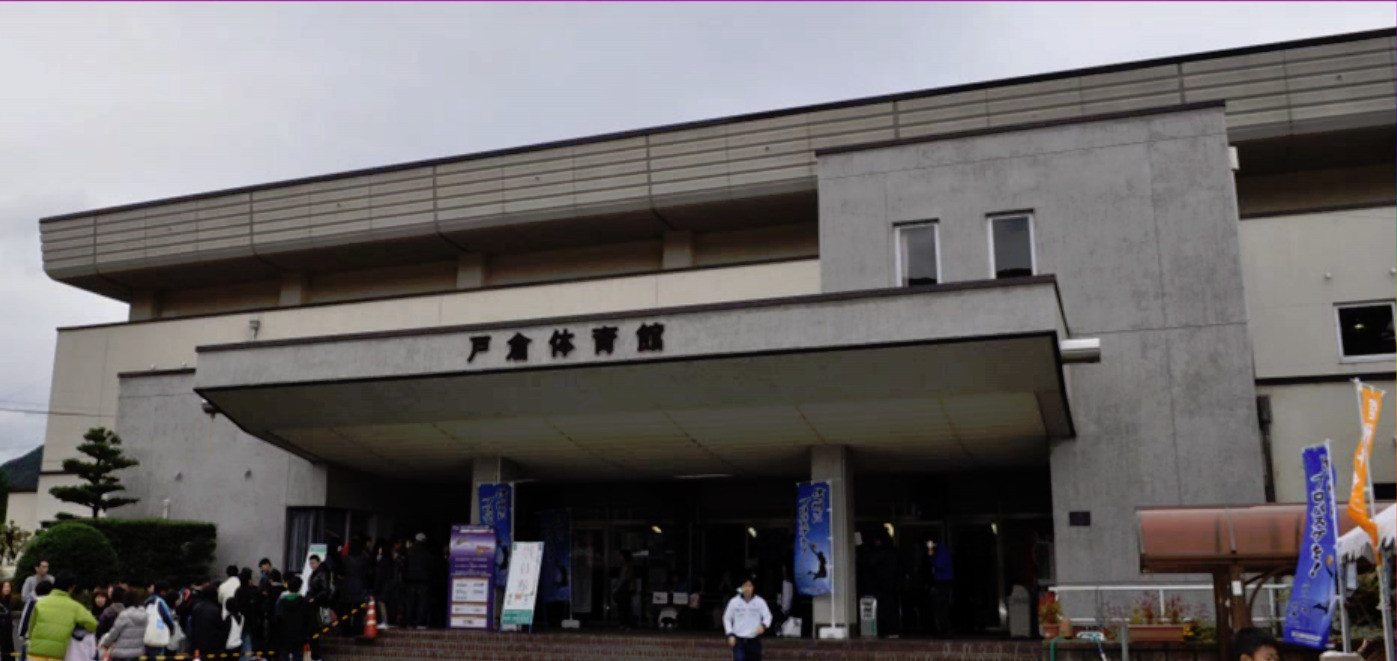
- Interactive map of Chikuma City Togura Gymnasium
- Full name: Chikuma City Togura Gymnasium
- Location: Chikuma, Nagano, Japan
- Owner: Chikuma city
- Operator: Chikuma city
- Capacity: 1,600

Construction
- Cost

Tenant
- Shinshu Brave Warriors (-2018)

Chikuma City Togura Gymnasium is an arena in Chikuma, Nagano, Japan. It is the former home arena of the Shinshu Brave Warriors of the B.League, Japan's professional basketball league. Warriors also play at the Matsumoto City Gymnasium, White Ring and Big Hat in the prefecture.
