= Katsuhisa =

- Gender: Male

Origin
- Origin: Japanese
- Meaning: Different meanings depending on the kanji used

Katsuhisa (written: 勝久, 克久 or 克寿) is a masculine Japanese given name as well as a surname. Notable people with the name include:

As a given name:

- Amago Katsuhisa (尼子 勝久; 1553–1578), Japanese daimyō
- Katsuhisa Ezaki (江崎 勝久; born 1941), Japanese businessman
- Katsuhisa Fujii (藤井 克久; born 1972), Japanese mixed martial artist
- Katsuhisa Hattori (服部 克久; born 1936), Japanese musician and composer
- Katsuhisa Hōki (宝亀 克寿; born 1946), Japanese voice actor and actor
- Katsuhisa Inamori (稲森 克尚; born 1994), Japanese footballer
- Katsuhisa Namase (生瀬 勝久; born 1960), Japanese actor
- Shimazu Katsuhisa (島津 勝久; 1503–1573), Japanese daimyō
- Katsuhisa Yamada (山田 勝久; born 1948), Japanese animator

As a surname:

- Michael Katsuhisa (勝久マイケル; born 1983), Japanese basketball coach
