= Patrick Sanders =

Patrick Sanders may refer to:

- Patrick Sanders (British Army officer) (born 1966), retired British Army general and Chief of Staff
- Patrick Sanders (basketball) (born 1985), American basketball player
