= Kotobuki Arena Chikuma =

Arena in Chikuma, Nagano

Coordinates: 36°31′50.9″N 138°6′50.9″E

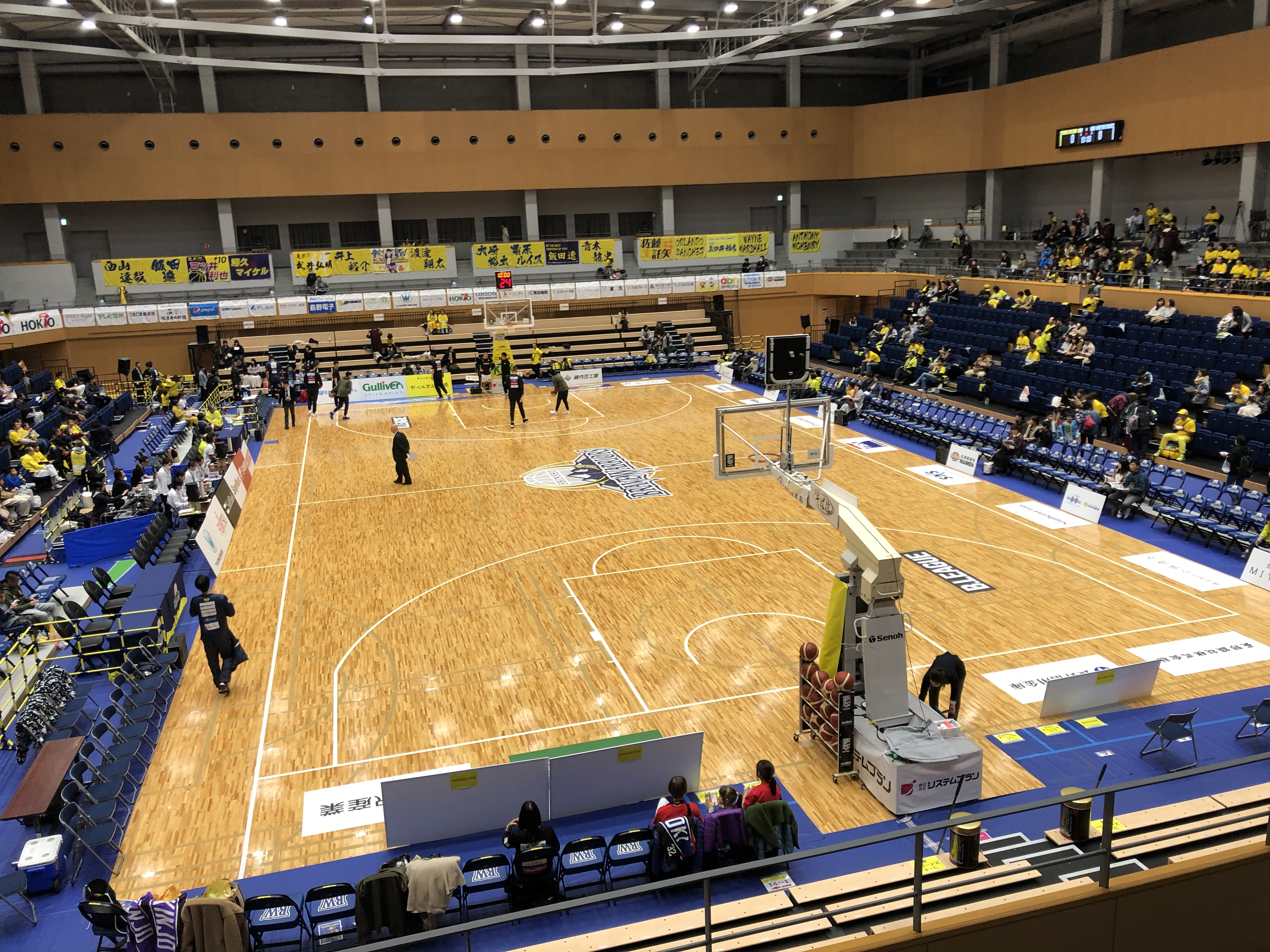
- Interactive map of Kotobuki Arena Chikuma
- Full name: Chikuma City Koshoku Gymnasium
- Location: Chikuma, Nagano, Japan
- Owner: Chikuma city
- Operator: Chikuma city
- Capacity: Basketball:3,000

Construction
- Opened: 2018
- Cost
- Architect: Kume Sekkei

Tenants
- Shinshu Brave Warriors (2018-); Boaluz Nagano

Kotobuki Arena Chikuma is an arena in Chikuma, Nagano, Japan. It is the home arena of the Shinshu Brave Warriors of the B.League, Japan's professional basketball league. Warriors also play at the Matsumoto City Gymnasium, White Ring and Big Hat in the prefecture.

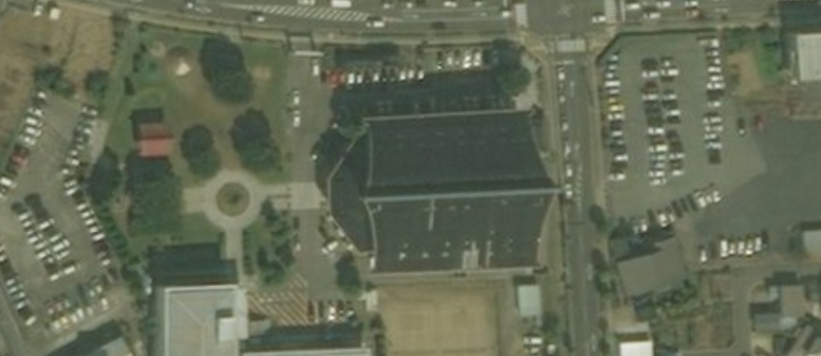
Satellite view of old Koshoku Gymnasium
