= Alexis Minatoya =

Japanese basketball player

Alexis Minatoya 湊谷安玲久司朱
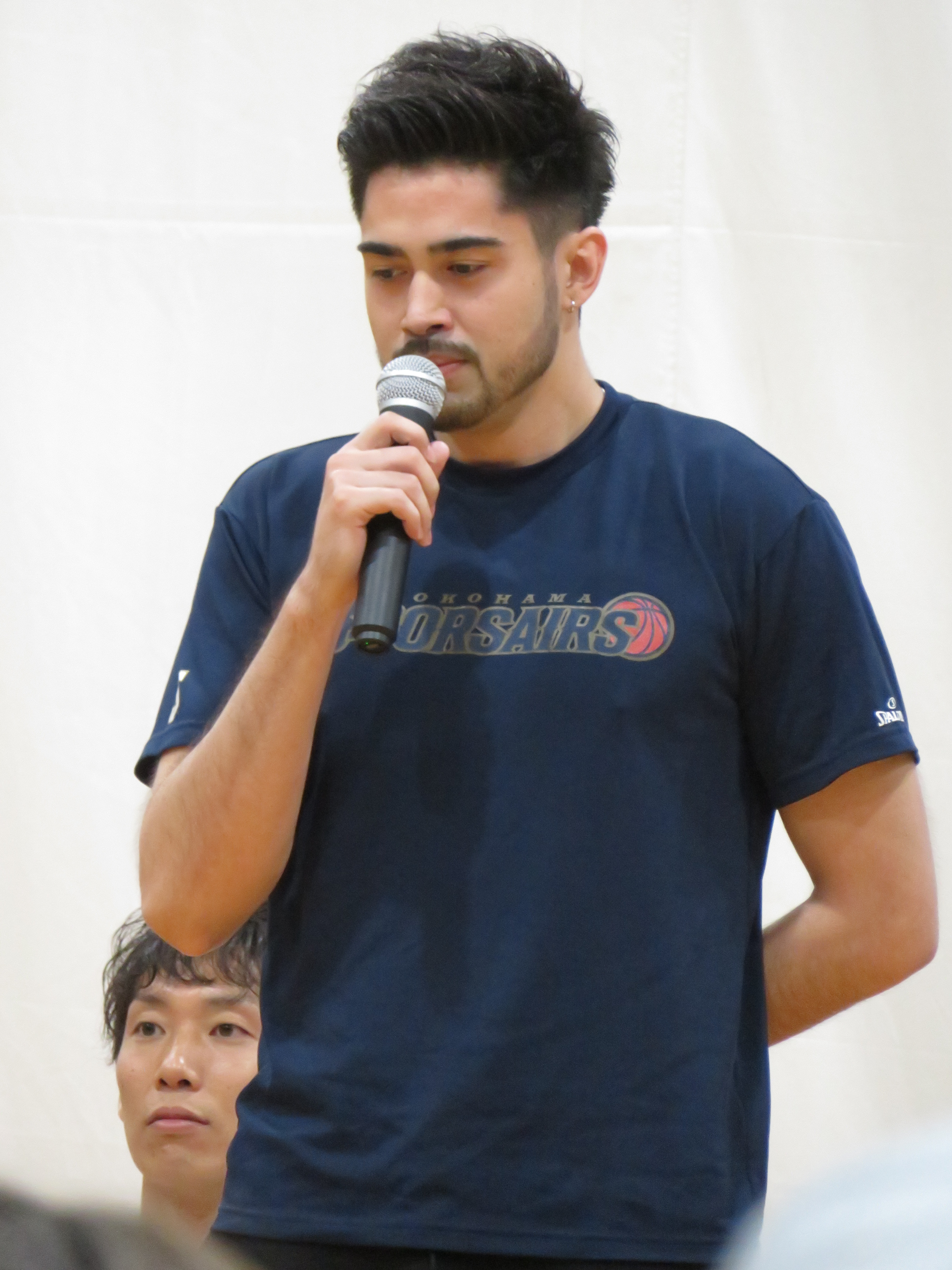
- Minatoya in 2019

Yokohama B-Corsairs
- Position: Point guard
- League: B.League

Personal information
- Born: 31 August 1988 (age 38) Aomori Prefecture
- Listed height: 6 ft 3 in (1.91 m)
- Listed weight: 194 lb (88 kg)

Career information
- Playing career: 2010–present

Career history
- 2010–2015: Diamond Dolphins
- 2015–2016: Ibaraki Robots
- 2016–2019: Yokohama B-Corsairs

Alexis Minatoya (born 31 August 1988) is a retired Japanese professional basketball player who last played for the Yokohama B-Corsairs of the B.League. Standing at 6 ft 3 in (1.91 m), he played as point guard.

== Biography ==
He is half Belgian and half Japanese, with a Belgian father and Japanese mother.

While attending Aomori Minami Junior High School, he participated in the Junior All-Star as a member of the Aomori Prefecture selection, finishing as runner-up. He was also included in the top 5 of the tournament. Thereafter he transferred to Tsugaru Junior High School. He participated again in the all-star game, losing to Osaka's Fujita Junior High School and again finishing as runner-up with his new team.

He then entered the Rakunan High School in Kyoto. He was in the starting lineup by his second year there. In three years, he led the team as an ace. He won the Inter-Highand and the Winter Cup. He scored 40 points in the final, tying the individual record for the most points scored in a Winter Cup men's final. He was selected in the top 5 of the tournament as well.

He joined the Mitsubishi Electric Diamond Dolphins Nagoya after attending Aoyama Gakuin University.

In July 2015, he transferred to Cyberdyne Tsukuba Robots. In 2016, he moved to Yokohama B-Corsairs.

He was appointed captain of the Yokohama B-Corsairs from the 2017-18 season, and was expected to play a prominent role in the team, but he was injured during the match against Levanga Hokkaido on 9 October 2017, just after the start of the season. He had torn his right achilles tendon and was diagnosed with a six-month recovery. In the 2017–18 season, he continued rehabilitation while accompanying the team as a coach, and returned to the court as a player for the first time in about seven months on 28 April 2018.

In the 2018-19 season, he faced the new season as a double captain with his teammate Masashi Hosoya, but he injured his right leg again during the match against Toyama Grouses on 7 October 2018, immediately after the opening of the season. He had to leave again due to a right hamstring strain, but returned to the team on the 17th at home to Toyama. However, after that, the season ended and he had only a short playing time throughout the season.

In May 2019, it was announced that he would be leaving the Yokohama B-Corsairs.

In September 2019, he announced his retirement from active duty. After his retirement, he worked at his family's business.

In September 2020, Minatoya announced his return to competition at 3x3 basketball team BEEFMAN.EXE.
