= Shusuke Ikuhara =

Japanese basketball player

Shusuke Ikuhara 生原秀将
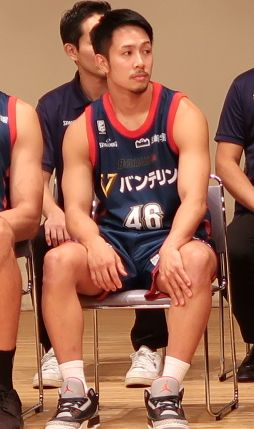

No. 46 – Shinshu Brave Warriors
- Position: Point guard
- League: B.League

Personal information
- Born: May 24, 1994 (age 32) Tokushima, Tokushima
- Listed height: 5 ft 11 in (1.80 m)
- Listed weight: 176 lb (80 kg)

Career information
- High school: Tokushima City (Tokushima, Tokushima)
- College: University of Tsukuba
- Playing career: 2016–present

Career history
- 2016–2018: Link Tochigi Brex
- 2018-2019: SeaHorses Mikawa
- 2019-2022: Yokohama B-Corsairs
- 2022-present: Shinshu Brave Warriors

Shusuke Ikuhara (生原秀将, Ikuhara Shusuke; born May 24, 1994) is a Japanese professional basketball player who plays for the Shinshu Brave Warriors of the B.League in Japan. He played college basketball for the University of Tsukuba.

== Career statistics ==
Legend
GP	Games played	GS	Games started	MPG	Minutes per game
FG%	Field goal percentage	3P%	3-point field goal percentage	FT%	Free throw percentage
RPG	Rebounds per game	APG	Assists per game	SPG	Steals per game
BPG	Blocks per game	PPG	Points per game	**Bold**	Career high

Year	Team	GP	GS	MPG	FG%	3P%	FT%	RPG	APG	SPG	BPG	TO	PPG
2016-17	Tochigi	11	0	7.1	.393	.375	.600	1.00	0.2	0.0	0.1	0.5	3.0
2017-18	Tochigi	57	0	17.6	.389	.330	.818	1.3	1.1	0.3	0.1	0.6	5.1
2018-19	Mikawa	53	46	20.3	.346	.275	.750	2.2	2.1	0.5	0.1	0.8	3.8
2019-20	Yokohama												
