= Taketo Aoki =

Japanese basketball player and coach

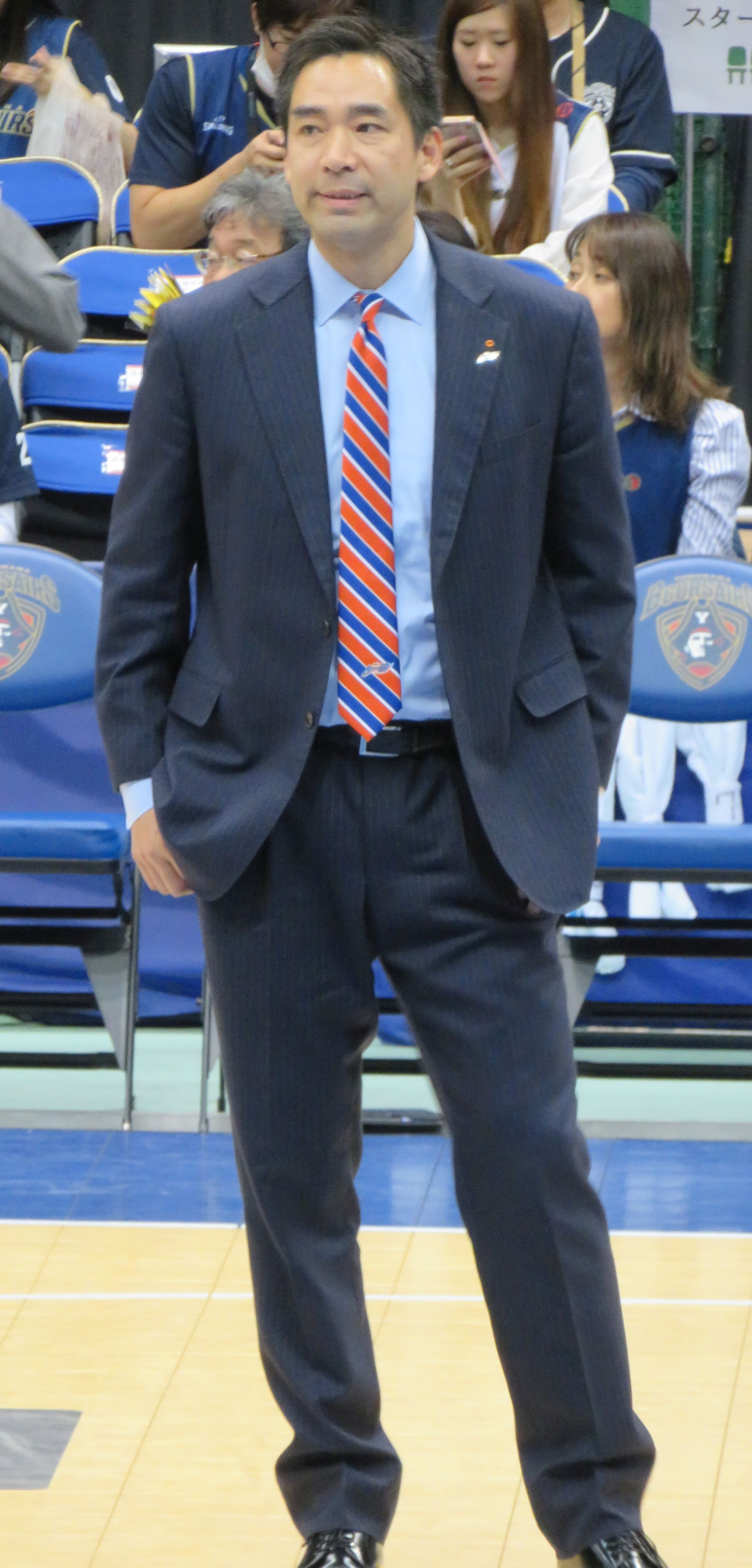

Yokohama B-Corsairs
- Position: Head coach
- League: B.League

Personal information
- Born: January 29, 1974 (age 52) Fujisawa, Kanagawa
- Listed height: 193 cm (6 ft 4 in)
- Listed weight: 92 kg (203 lb)

Career information
- High school: Kamakura Gakuen (Kamakura, Kanagawa)
- College: Senshu University
- Playing career: 1992–2007

Career history

Playing
- 1996-2004: Daiwa/Niigata Albirex
- 2005-2006: Tokyo Apache
- 2006-2008: Oita Heat Devils
- 2008-2010: Ryukyu Golden Kings
- 2010-2011: Oita Heat Devils
- 2011-2013: Yokohama B-Corsairs

Coaching
- 2013-2015: Yokohama B-Corsairs (asst)
- 2015-2017: Yokohama B-Corsairs
- 2017-2021: Niigata Albirex BB (associate)
- 2021-present: Yokohama B-Corsairs

Taketo Aoki (青木勇人, Aoki Taketo) is the head coach of the Yokohama B-Corsairs in the Japanese B.League.

== Head coaching record ==
Legend
Regular season	G	Games coached	W	Games won	L	Games lost	W–L %	Win–loss %
Playoffs	PG	Playoff games	PW	Playoff wins	PL	Playoff losses	PW–L %	Playoff win–loss %

Team	Year	G	W	L	W–L%	Finish	PG	PW	PL	PW–L%	Result
Yokohama B-Corsairs	2015-16	52	19	33	.365	10th in Eastern	-	-	-	–	-
Yokohama B-Corsairs	2016-17	47	15	32	.319	Fired	-	-	-	–	-
