= Yuki Kawamura =

Japanese basketball player (born 2001)

Yuki Kawamura 河村 勇輝
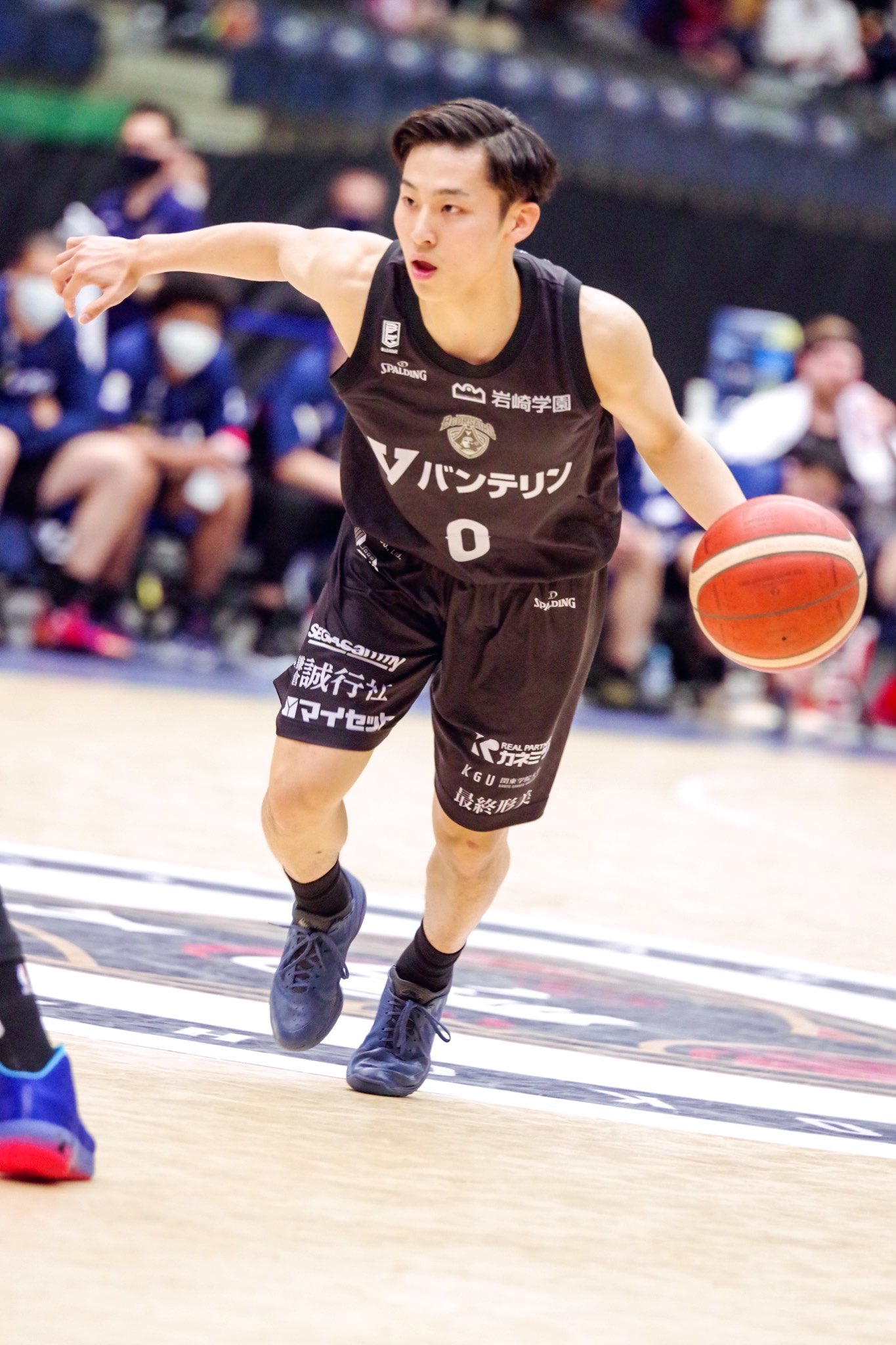
- Kawamura with the Yokohama B-Corsairs in 2021

No. 11 – San Diego Clippers
- Position: Point guard
- League: NBA G League

Personal information
- Born: 2 May 2001 (age 25) Yanai, Yamaguchi, Japan
- Listed height: 5 ft 7 in (1.70 m)
- Listed weight: 159 lb (72 kg)

Career information
- High school: Fukuoka Daiichi (Fukuoka, Fukuoka)
- College: Tokai University
- NBA draft: 2023: undrafted
- Playing career: 2019–present

Career history
- 2020: San-en NeoPhoenix
- 2020–2024: Yokohama B-Corsairs
- 2024–2025: Memphis Grizzlies
- 2024–2025: →Memphis Hustle
- 2026: Chicago Bulls
- 2026: →Windy City Bulls
- 2026–present: San Diego Clippers

Career highlights
- NBA G League Next Up Game (2025); B.League Most Valuable Player (2023); B.League Rookie of the Year (2023); B.League Assist Leader (2024); All-B. League First Team (2023)
- Stats at NBA.com
- Stats at Basketball Reference

Yuki Kawamura (河村 勇輝, Kawamura Yūki) (born 2 May 2001) is a Japanese professional basketball player for the San Diego Clippers of the NBA G League. He previously played for the Chicago Bulls and Memphis Grizzlies in the National Basketball Association (NBA). Kawamura also plays for the Japan national team, with whom he played at the 2023 World Cup and 2024 Olympics. At 5 ft 7 in (1.70 m) tall, Kawamura was the shortest player during the 2025–26 NBA season.

== Early life, family and high school ==
Kawamura was born in Yanai, Yamaguchi. His parents were very supportive of his basketball aspirations.

Kawamura idolized professional and national team player Yuki Togashi, who excelled despite being relatively short, at 1.68 m (5 ft 6 in). Kawamura attended Fukuoka Daiichi High School and led its basketball team to back-to-back All-Japanese High School championships.

== Professional career ==
=== San-en NeoPhoenix (2020) ===
As a high schooler, Kawamura started his career under special designated player status with the San-en NeoPhoenix in January 2020. In his first game, Kawamura became the youngest player in B.League history, at 18 years of age. He later also became the youngest player to score in a B.League game.

=== Yokohama B-Corsairs (2020–2024) ===
During the offseason, Kawamura moved to Yokohama to join the Yokohama B-Corsairs, still under special designation. Enrolling at Tokai University, he left school to go pro at the beginning of the 2022–23 season. He immediately made an impact, winning the B.League's MVP award. In addition, with the B-Corsairs, he won Rookie of the Year and made the Best Five team.

=== Memphis Grizzlies / Hustle (2024–2025) ===
On 6 September 2024, Kawamura signed with the Memphis Grizzlies of the National Basketball Association and on 19 October, his training camp deal was converted into a two-way contract. On 14 October 2024, Kawamura scored a career-high 10 points and passed for seven assists in a 120–116 win against the Indiana Pacers.

=== Chicago Bulls / Windy City Bulls (2026) ===
Kawamura joined the Chicago Bulls for the 2025 NBA Summer League. On 19 July 2025, Kawamura signed a two-way contract with the Bulls. He was released by the Bulls during training camp on 17 October, due to a lower right leg injury he sustained, which was later revealed to be a blood clot.

On January 6, 2026, the Bulls decided to re-sign Kawamura to a two-way contract following the healing of his lower leg injury. Kawamura made his regular season debut for the Bulls on January 31, tallying six points, three rebounds, two assists, and two steals in a 125–118 win against the Miami Heat. He concluded his season with a career-high 14 points against Dallas. For the season, he appeared in 18 games averaging 3.4 points, 2.6 assists and 1.8 rebounds in 11.6 minutes.

=== Los Angeles Clippers / San Diego Clippers (2026) ===
On June 30, 2026, it was announced that Kawamura would be participating with the Indiana Pacers in the 2026 NBA Summer League. However, he didn't make the final cut for the team. On August 10, 2026, Kawamura signed an Exhibit 10 contract with the Los Angeles Clippers. He was waived by the Clippers on October 12, 2026.

== National team career ==
Kawamura played for the Japan men's national under-16 team at the 2017 FIBA U16 Asian Championships. In six games, Kawamura averaged 5.3 points, 4.0 rebounds, and 4.3 assists.

Kawamura made his Japan men's national basketball team debut in the 2023 World Cup qualifiers against Taiwan. In a 89–49 victory, Kawamura recorded zero points, three rebounds, eight assists and five steals. Kawamura played six more qualifier games for Japan and averaged 10.4 points, 2.3 rebounds, 5.6 assists, and 2.7 steals.

Kawamura represented Japan at the 2023 FIBA Basketball World Cup. Kawamura was an important contributor in Japan's 98–88 upset victory over Finland, as he accumulated 25 points, nine assists, and one rebound in Japan's first victory over a European team. In all five games, Kawamura averaged 13.6 points, 2.0 rebounds, and 7.6 assists.

The following year, Kawamura represented Japan at the 2024 Olympics. In the second game, they narrowly lost to France 94–90 in overtime, and Kawamura scored a career-high 29 points, with seven rebounds and six assists in the effort. In three games played, Kawamura averaged 20.3 points, 7.7 assists, and 3.3 rebounds.

== Career statistics ==
Legend
GP	Games played	GS	Games started	MPG	Minutes per game
FG%	Field goal percentage	3P%	3-point field goal percentage	FT%	Free throw percentage
RPG	Rebounds per game	APG	Assists per game	SPG	Steals per game
BPG	Blocks per game	PPG	Points per game	**Bold**	Career high

=== NBA ===
Year	Team	GP	GS	MPG	FG%	3P%	FT%	RPG	APG	SPG	BPG	PPG
2024–25	Memphis	**22**	0	4.2	**.367**	**.304**	.778	.5	.9	.1	.0	1.6
2025–26	Chicago	18	0	**11.6**	.327	.297	**.895**	**1.8**	**2.6**	**.5**	.0	**3.4**
Career		40	0	7.6	.341	.300	.857	1.1	1.7	.3	.0	2.5
