= Pape Mour Faye =

Japanese basketball player (born 1987)

Pape Mour Faye ファイ・パプ月瑠
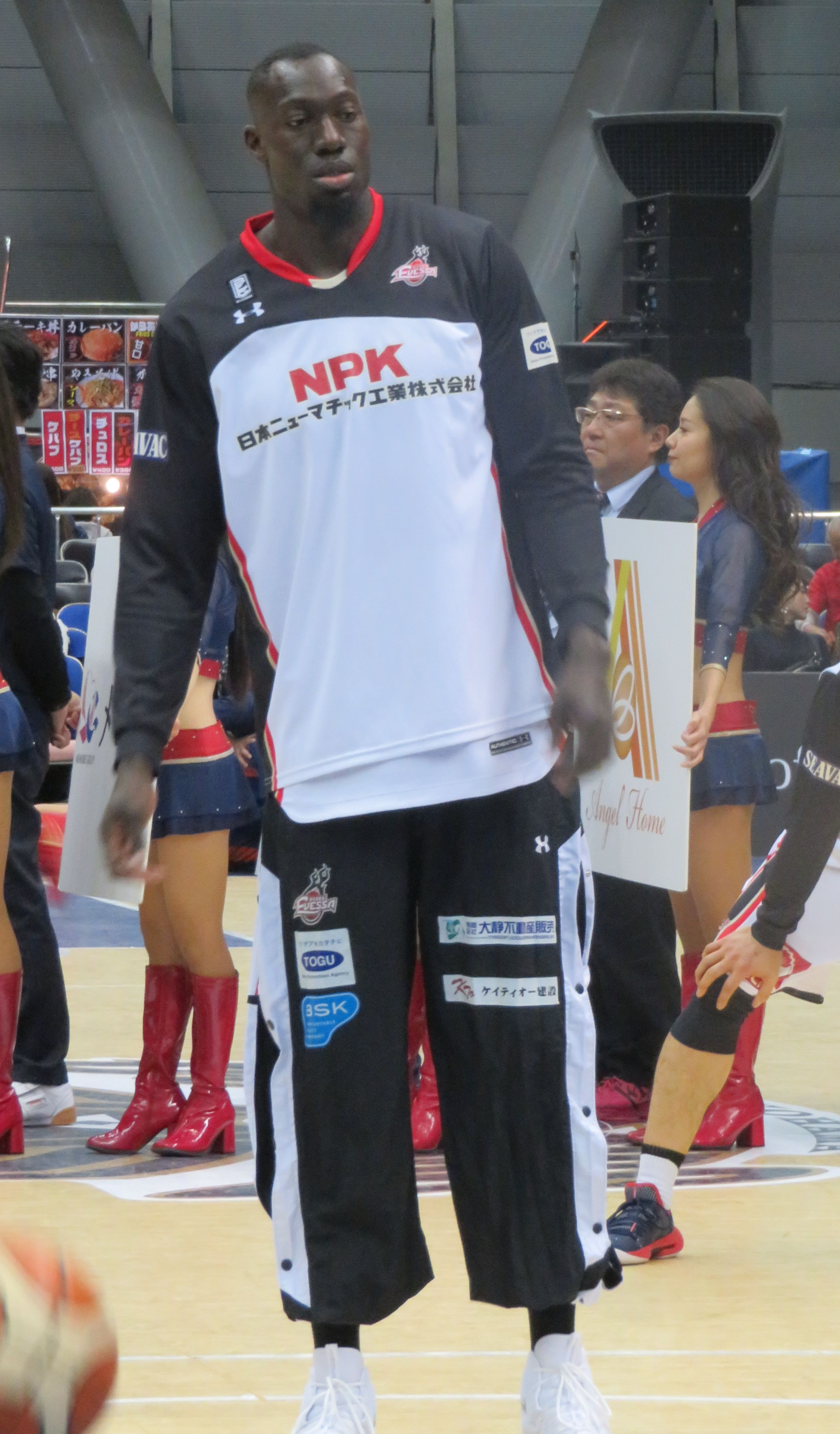

No. 10 – Niigata Albirex BB
- Position: Center
- League: B.League

Personal information
- Born: June 22, 1987 (age 39) Pikine, Senegal
- Listed height: 201 cm (6 ft 7 in)
- Listed weight: 101 kg (223 lb)

Career information
- High school: Nobeoka Gauen (Nobeoka, Miyazaki)
- College: Kanto Gakuin University
- Playing career: 2011–present

Career history
- 2011–2013: Yokohama B-Corsairs
- 2013: Chiba Jets
- 2014–2015: Hiroshima Dragonflies
- 2015–2016: Niigata Albirex BB
- 2016–2017: Yokohama B-Corsairs
- 2017–2018: Rizing Zephyr Fukuoka
- 2018–2019: Osaka Evessa
- 2019–2021: Levanga Hokkaido
- 2021–2023: Saga Ballooners
- 2023–present: Niigata Albirex BB

Career highlights
- bj League champion (2013); B2 League champion (2018)

Pape Mour Faye (ファイ・パプ月瑠, Fai Papu Muru; born June 22, 1986), or Pape Faye, is a professional basketball player for the Niigata Albirex BB of the B.League. He was selected by the Yokohama B-Corsairs with the 8th overall pick in the 2011 bj League draft. Born in Senegal, he was a member of Japan's national basketball team in 2016.

== Career statistics ==
Legend
GP	Games played	GS	Games started	MPG	Minutes per game
FG%	Field goal percentage	3P%	3-point field goal percentage	FT%	Free throw percentage
RPG	Rebounds per game	APG	Assists per game	SPG	Steals per game
BPG	Blocks per game	PPG	Points per game	**Bold**	Career high

Year	Team	GP	GS	MPG	FG%	3P%	FT%	RPG	APG	SPG	BPG	PPG
2011-12	Yokohama	51	13	16.7	.533	.000	.410	5.3	0.4	0.5	0.2	5.9
2012-13	Yokohama	52	34	24.5	.504	---	.550	8.2	0.5	0.6	0.9	9.4
2013-14	Chiba	4	3	18.0	.533	---	.214	5.5	0	0.3	0.5	4.8
2014-15	Hiroshima	54	54	28.7	.517	.000	.436	8.9	1.0	0.7	0.9	10.8
2015-16	Niigata	52	50	34.0	.521	.000	.486	9.9	3.4	1.0	0.7	11.4
2016-17	Yokohama	60	30	26.0	.513	.091	.370	7.5	1.2	0.3	0.3	7.9
2017-18	Fukuoka	60	56	24.8	.486	.000	.484	7.6	2.1	0.5	0.3	8.4
2018-19	Osaka	60	19	21.4	.519	.000	.509	5.0	1.0	0.5	0.2	8.1

=== Playoffs ===
Year	Team	GP	GS	MPG	FG%	3P%	FT%	RPG	APG	SPG	BPG	PPG
2016-17	Yokohama	3	3	24.04	.391	.000	.250	7.0	1.0	1.0	0	7.0
2016-17	Yokohama	1	0	26.36	.500	.000	.333	7.0	1.0	4.0	0	7.0
2017-18	Fukuoka	5	5	22.10	.607	.000	.444	6.0	1.2	0.8	0.4	7.6

=== Early cup games ===
Year	Team	GP	GS	MPG	FG%	3P%	FT%	RPG	APG	SPG	BPG	PPG
2018	Osaka	2	0	25.32	.588	.000	.500	5.5	0.5	0.5	0	13.0
