= Draelon Burns =

American basketball player (born 1985)

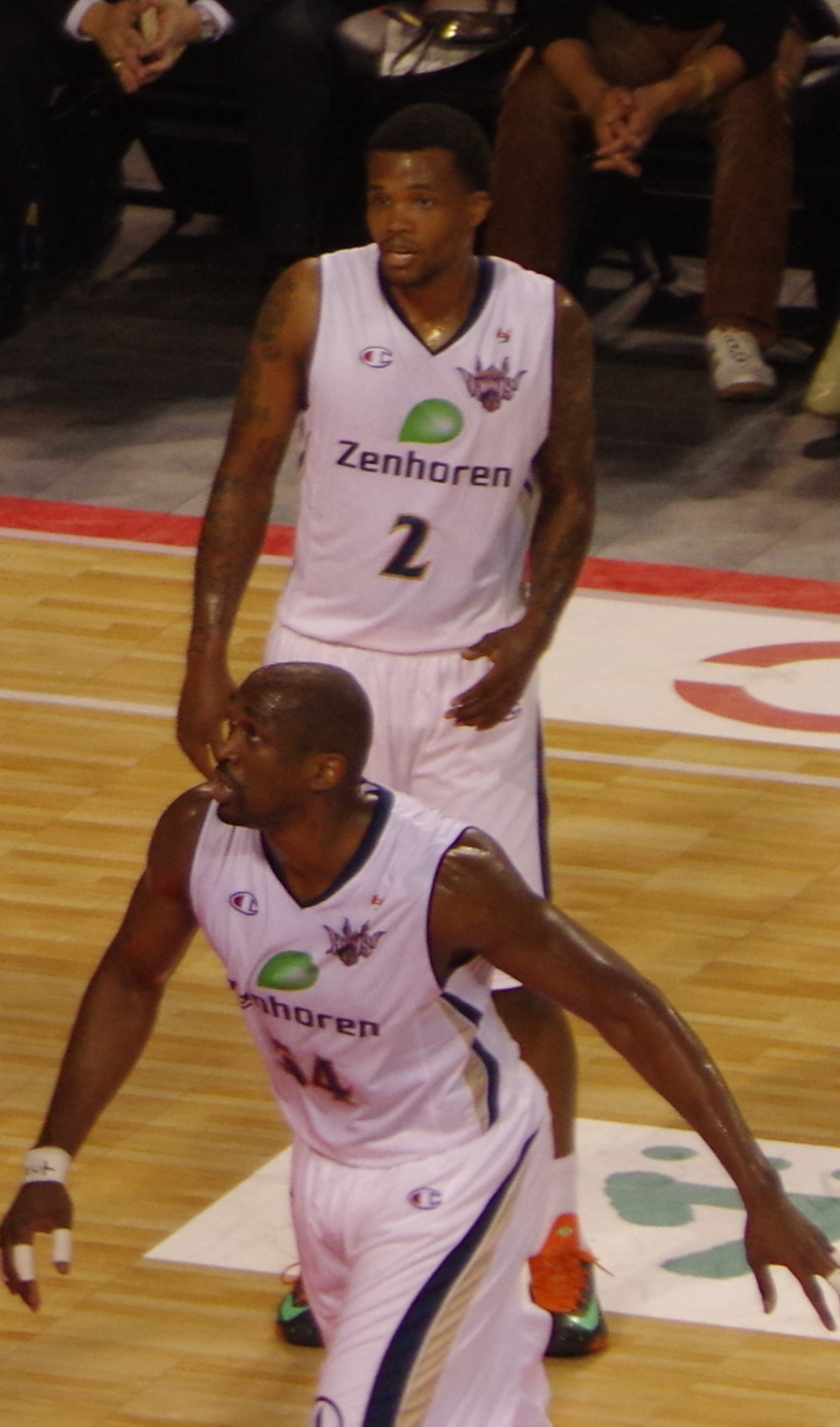
- Burns playing for Ryukyu in 2014

Personal information
- Born: October 7, 1985 (age 41) Milwaukee, Wisconsin, U.S.
- Listed height: 6 ft 5 in (1.96 m)
- Listed weight: 209 lb (95 kg)

Career information
- High school: Laurinburg Institute (Laurinburg, North Carolina)
- College: DePaul (2004–2008)
- NBA draft: 2008: undrafted
- Playing career: 2008–2023
- Position: Guard

Career history
- 2008–2009: Eroni Kiryat Ata
- 2010: Keflavík
- 2010–2011: Webmoebel Paderborn
- 2011: Elitzur Yavne
- 2012–2013: Yokohama B-Corsairs
- 2013–2016: Ryukyu Golden Kings
- 2016–2020: Nishinomiya Storks
- 2020: Earthfriends Tokyo Z
- 2023: Shinshu Brave Warriors

Career highlights
- bj League Best Five (2013); bj League Sixth Man of the Year (2015); 3x bj League champions

Draelon Clayton Burns (born October 7, 1985) is an American professional basketball player for Shinshu Brave Warriors in Japan. Standing at 6 ft 5 in (1.96 m), he primarily plays as point guard or shooting guard.

== Playing career ==
Burns joined Úrvalsdeild karla club Keflavík in January 2010 and went on to average 21.2 points and 4.2 assists in 10 regular season games. He helped Keflavík to the Úrvalsdeild finals in April that year but the ankle injury in the second game forced him to miss the rest of the series which Keflavík lost 2–3 against Snæfell.

== Career statistics ==
Legend
GP	Games played	GS	Games started	MPG	Minutes per game
FG%	Field goal percentage	3P%	3-point field goal percentage	FT%	Free throw percentage
RPG	Rebounds per game	APG	Assists per game	SPG	Steals per game
BPG	Blocks per game	PPG	Points per game	**Bold**	Career high

=== bj League ===
Year	Team	GP	GS	MPG	FG%	3P%	FT%	RPG	APG	SPG	BPG	PPG
2011–12	Yokohama B-Corsairs	24	18	24.1	.453	.336	.694	3.7	2.7	1.3	0.2	12.8
2012–13	Yokohama	47	6	28.7	.439	.381	.820	6.6	4.8	2.0	0.2	21.4
2013–14	Ryukyu Golden Kings	42	5	28.2	.400	.384	.759	5.7	3.4	1.1	0.3	17.0
2014–15	Ryukyu	48	1	26.2	.441	.387	.778	4.5	2.2	3.0	0.2	15.1
2015–16	Ryukyu	52	21	23.0	.396	.341	.837	5.4	3.4	0.9	0.3	12.8
