= Kenji Yamada (basketball) =

Japanese basketball player

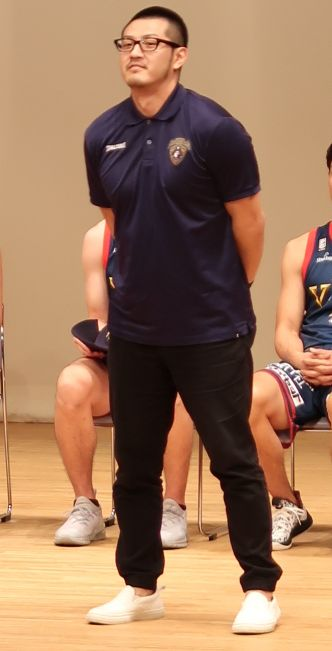
- Yamada in 2019

Yokohama B-Corsairs
- Title: Assistant coach
- League: B.League

Personal information
- Born: July 28, 1983 (age 43) Asahi-ku, Yokohama
- Listed height: 5 ft 11 in (1.80 m)
- Listed weight: 172 lb (78 kg)

Career information
- High school: Noshiro Technical (Noshiro, Akita)
- College: Hosei University
- Playing career: 2006–2019
- Position: Point guard
- Number: 13
- Coaching career: 2019–present

Career history

Playing
- 2006–2007: Otsuka Corporation Alphas
- 2007-2011: Link Tochigi Brex
- 2011-2018: Yokohama B-Corsairs
- 2018-2019: Hiroshima Dragonflies

Coaching
- 2019–present: Yokohama B-Corsairs (assistant)

Career highlights
- JBL2 Steal leader; JBL champion (2010); bj league Champions (2013); 2x Japanese High School Champions

Kenji Yamada (山田 謙治, Yamada Kenji; born July 28, 1983) is a Japanese former professional basketball player who last played for the Hiroshima Dragonflies of the B.League in Japan. He was selected by the Yokohama B-Corsairs with the first overall pick in the 2011 bj League draft.
