= Shota Shakuno =

Japanese basketball coach

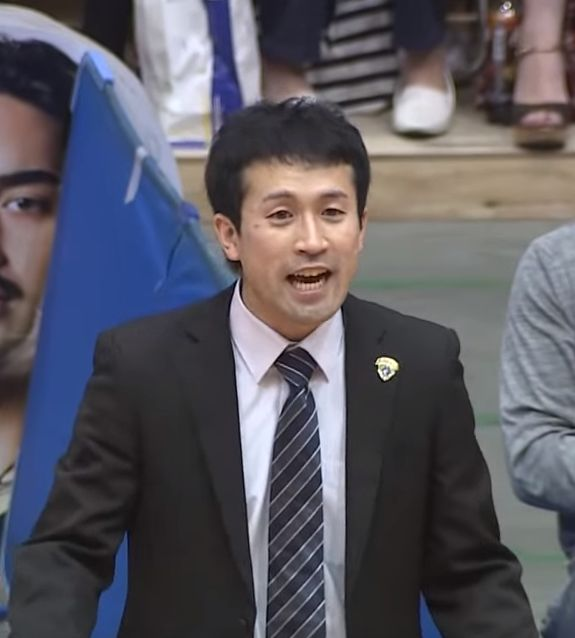

Hiroshima Dragonflies
- Position: U-15 Head coach
- League: B.League

Personal information
- Born: December 20, 1983 (age 42) Hiroshima, Hiroshima

Career information
- High school: Gion Kita (Hiroshima, Hiroshima)
- College: Chiba University

Career history

Coaching
- 2005–2007: Chiba University
- 2008–2013: Toride Seitoku HS
- 2016–2017: Yokohama B-Corsairs (assistant)
- 2017–2018: Yokohama B-Corsairs
- 2018–2019: Hiroshima Dragonflies
- 2019-2021: Hiroshima Dragonflies U15
- 2021: Hiroshima Dragonflies

Shota Shakuno (尺野 将太, Shakuno Shota) is the head coach of the Hiroshima Dragonflies U-15 in the Japanese B.League.

== Head coaching record ==
Legend
Regular season	G	Games coached	W	Games won	L	Games lost	W–L %	Win–loss %
Playoffs	PG	Playoff games	PW	Playoff wins	PL	Playoff losses	PW–L %	Playoff win–loss %

Team	Year	G	W	L	W–L%	Finish	PG	PW	PL	PW–L%	Result
Yokohama B-Corsairs	2017	13	1	12	.077	6th in Central	-	-	-	–	-
Yokohama B-Corsairs	2017-18	41	14	27	.341	6th in Central	-	-	-	–	-
Hiroshima Dragonflies	2018-19	60	32	28	.533	3rd in B2 Western	-	-	-	–	-
