= Cory Johnson (basketball) =

American basketball player

Free agent
- Position: Power forward

Personal information
- Born: April 5, 1988 (age 38)
- Listed height: 6 ft 7 in (2.01 m)
- Listed weight: 240 lb (109 kg)

Career information
- High school: Duluth East (Duluth, Minnesota)
- College: Iowa State (2006–2008); Valparaiso (2009–2011)
- NBA draft: 2011: undrafted
- Playing career: 2011–present

Career history
- 2011–2012: Korihait
- 2012–2013: Básquet Coruña
- 2013–2014: Società Atletica Basket Massagno
- 2014–2015: KTP Basket
- 2015–2016: Yokohama B-Corsairs
- 2016–2018: T71 Dudelange
- 2018–2019: Ehime Orange Vikings

Cory Rockne Johnson (born April 5, 1988) is an American professional basketball player who last played for Ehime Orange Vikings in Japan. He played college basketball for Iowa State and Valparaiso.

== College career ==
Johnson began his college career at Iowa State University where he played two seasons for the Cyclones before transferring to Valparaiso University. After sitting out a redshirt year, Johnson spent the 2009–10 and 2010–11 basketball seasons competing for the Crusaders. During his senior year, he was selected as a preseason Second Team All-Horizon League honoree and named MVP of the Lou Henson Award Tournament. He helped lead the crusaders to a 23–12 record and a spot in the 2011 CollegeInsider.com Postseason Tournament. A Second Team All-Horizon League selection in his Junior year, Johnson also earned a spot on the league All-Newcomer squad averaging 15.6 points and 5.8 rebounds. Johnson also finished second in the Horizon League with .556 field goal percentage, which ranked 20th nationally.

== Professional career ==
Following the completion of his college career, Johnson signed with basketball club WCAA Giants of the Dutch Basketball League (DBL). Due to financial difficulties the club withdrew from the DBL prior to the 2011–12 season. Johnson then signed with UU-Korihait, which competes in Korisliiga, the top men's basketball league in Finland. He averaged 16.9 points 6.0 rebounds and 1.4 assists for Korihait during the 2011–12 season.

Johnson played for CB Coruña during the Spain 2012–13 LEB Oro season.

In July 2013, Johnson signed with SAM Massagno Basket in Switzerland for the 2013–2014 season. He finished the regular season second in the Ligue Nationale de Basketball in scoring, averaging 20.3 points, while adding 6.4 rebounds and 2 assists per game. In the 2014 post season awards, Johnson was named All-Swiss LNA 3rd team by Eurobasket.com.

In October 2014, Johnson joined KTP Basket of the Finnish Korisliiga to compete in the 2014–2015 EuroChallenge.

On February 10, 2015, he signed with BBC Monthey of the Swiss Ligue Nationale de Basket.

On August 22, 2015, an agreement was made with the Yokohama B-Corsairs for the final season of the Japanese bj League.

== Career statistics ==
Legend
GP	Games played	GS	Games started	MPG	Minutes per game
FG%	Field goal percentage	3P%	3-point field goal percentage	FT%	Free throw percentage
RPG	Rebounds per game	APG	Assists per game	SPG	Steals per game
BPG	Blocks per game	PPG	Points per game	**Bold**	Career high

Year	Team	GP	GS	MPG	FG%	3P%	FT%	RPG	APG	SPG	BPG	PPG
2015–16	Yokohama B-Corsairs	50	34	25.7	.467	.299	.782	6.8	1.6	.9	.4	14.8
