= Shogo Fukuda =

Japanese basketball coach

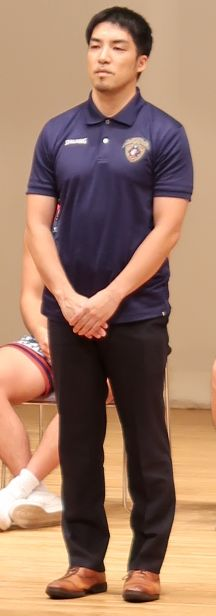

Akita Northern Happinets
- Position: Assistant coach
- League: B.League

Personal information
- Born: 14 January 1984 (age 42) Karatsu, Saga

Career information
- College: Tokyo University of Science; National Institute of Fitness and Sports in Kanoya; St. John's University

Career history

Coaching
- 2008-2010: National Institute of Fitness and Sports in Kanoya
- 2010-2013: Westmont College (asst)
- 2013-2015: St. John's University (VC)
- 2016-2017: Sendai 89ers (associate)
- 2017-2019: Shimane Susanoo Magic (asst)
- 2019-2020: Yokohama B-Corsairs (asst)
- 2020: Yokohama B-Corsairs
- 2020-2021: Niigata Albirex BB
- 2022-2023: Ibaraki Robots(asst)
- 2023-: Akita Northern Happinets(asst)

Shogo Fukuda (福田 将吾, Fukuda Shōgo) is a Japanese basketball coach and a former player. He was college basketball coach of National Institute of Fitness and Sports in Kanoya, Westmont College, and St. John's University.

On 9 July 2016, Shogo signed with Yokohama B-Corsairs in the Japanese B.League for the 2019–20 season.

== Personal life ==
He earned a 3.64 grade point average (GPA) at St. John's University.

== Head coaching record ==
Legend
Regular season	G	Games coached	W	Games won	L	Games lost	W–L %	Win–loss %
Playoffs	PG	Playoff games	PW	Playoff wins	PL	Playoff losses	PW–L %	Playoff win–loss %

Team	Year	G	W	L	W–L%	Finish	PG	PW	PL	PW–L%	Result
Yokohama B-Corsairs	2019-20	9	3	6	.333	5th in Central	-	-	-	–	-
