= Reggie Geary =

American basketball guard

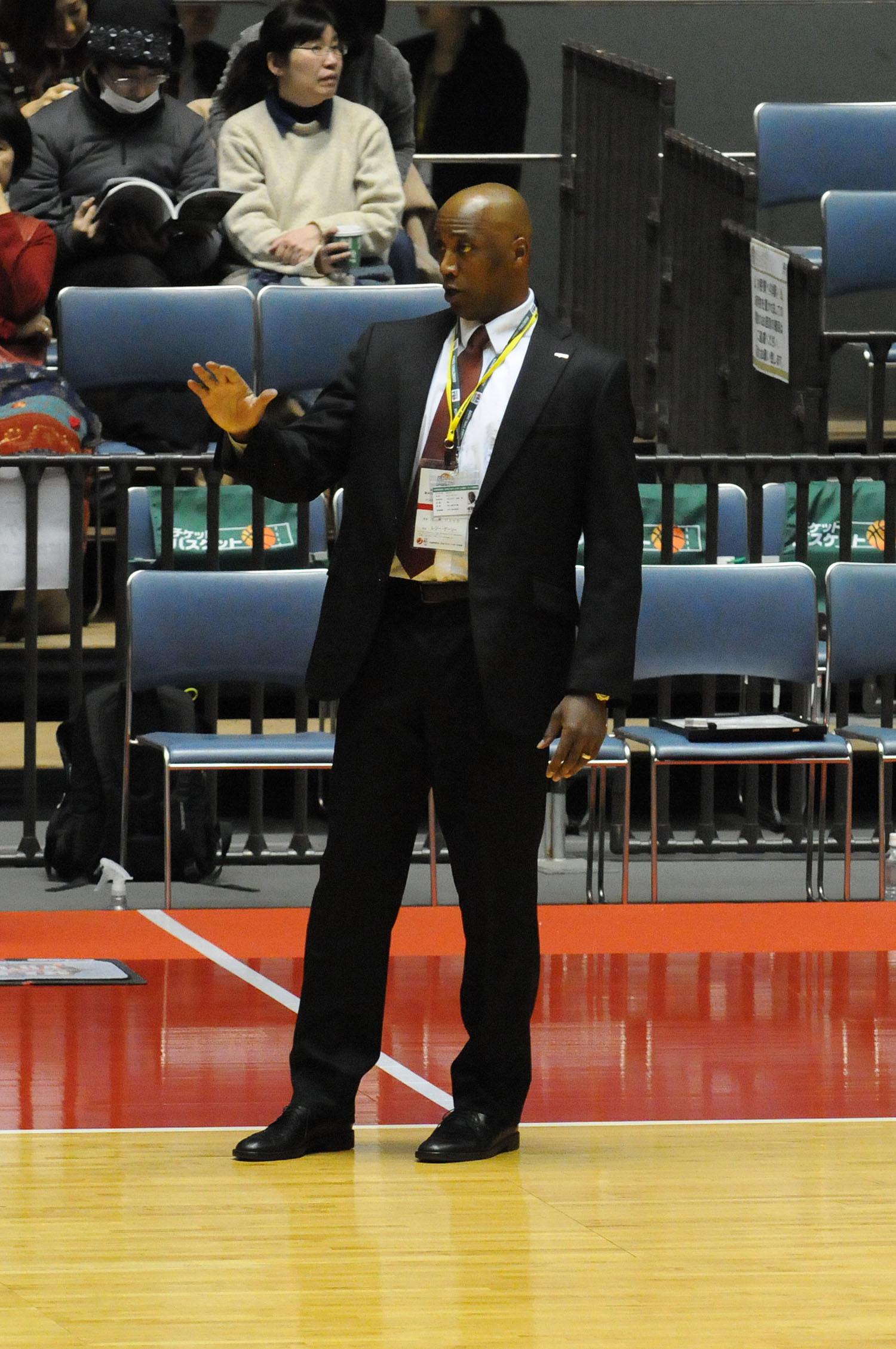

Personal information
- Born: August 31, 1973 (age 53) Trenton, New Jersey, U.S.
- Listed height: 6 ft 2 in (1.88 m)
- Listed weight: 187 lb (85 kg)

Career information
- High school: Mater Dei (Santa Ana, California)
- College: Arizona (1992–1996)
- NBA draft: 1996: 2nd round, 56th overall pick
- Drafted by: Cleveland Cavaliers
- Playing career: 1996–2004
- Position: Point guard
- Number: 2, 4
- Coaching career: 2007–present

Career history

Playing
- 1996–1997: Cleveland Cavaliers
- 1997–1998: San Antonio Spurs
- 1998–1999: Quad City Thunder
- 1999–2000: Idaho Stampede
- 2000–2001: Bnei Herzliya
- 2001–2002: Porto
- 2002–2003: JL Bourg-en-Bresse
- 2003–2004: BC Kyiv

Coaching
- 2007–2008: Anaheim Arsenal
- 2008–2009: Arizona Wildcats (assistant)
- 2009–2011: SMU Mustangs (assistant)
- 2011–2013: Yokohama B-Corsairs
- 2013–2015: Chiba Jets
- 2015–2017: Mitsubishi Diamond Dolphins Nagoya

Career highlights
- First-team All-Pac-10 (1996); ESPN Mr. Velcro, Dick Vitale's National Defensive POY 1996; bj League Coach of the Year (Japan) 2012; bj League Champions (Yokohama B-Corsairs, Japan) 2013

Career NBA statistics
- Points: 209 (2.1 ppg)
- Assists: 110 (1.1 apg)
- Stats at NBA.com
- Stats at Basketball Reference

Reggie Elliot Geary (born August 31, 1973) is an American former professional basketball guard for the NBA's Cleveland Cavaliers (1996–97) and San Antonio Spurs (1997–98). Since 2011 he has coached several teams in Japan's professional basketball leagues.

Geary played college basketball for the Arizona Wildcats under head coach Lute Olson. As a player at Arizona, the Wildcats had a 104–23 (.819) record, two Pac-10 Conference championships, and an appearance in the 1994 Final Four. He remains Arizona's fourth all-time steals leader (208) and sixth all-time leader in assists (560). Aside from his NBA career, Geary played two seasons in the Continental Basketball Association (1998 to 2000), and in Israel, Portugal, France and Ukraine. He played with the jersey number 2 or 4.

In 2005, Geary became recruiting and basketball operations coordinator at Arizona, working under Lute Olson. He then became head coach of the NBA D-League's Anaheim Arsenal for 18 months, before returning to Olson's staff as an assistant coach in 2008. From 2009 to 2011, Geary was an assistant coach at Southern Methodist University under head coach Matt Doherty.

In 2012, Geary was named coach of the year while at the helm for the Japanese professional basketball league's Yokohama B-Corsairs. The following season, Geary led the B-Corsairs to the league title, becoming the league's first foreign-born coach to win the championship.

He left the B-Corsairs at the end of the 2012–13 season due to the club's financial difficulties. In July 2013 he signed to coach the Chiba Jets, a team which was moving from the bj-league to the National Basketball League during the same off-season. After an 18–36 record in 2013–14, Geary led the Jets to the NBL playoffs in 2014–15 with a 34–20 record.

Geary's contract with the Jets was not renewed at the end of the 2014–15 season. He signed with the Mitsubishi Diamond Dolphins Nagoya of the NBL in June 2015 and led the team to a seventh-place 27–28 record in the 2015–16 season, losing in the first round of the playoffs to Link Tochigi Brex.

== Head coaching record ==
Legend
| Regular season | G | Games coached | W | Games won | L | Games lost | W–L % | Win–loss % |
| Playoffs | PG | Playoff games | PW | Playoff wins | PL | Playoff losses | PW–L % | Playoff win–loss % |

| Team | Year | G | W | L | W–L% | Finish | PG | PW | PL | PW–L% | Result |
|---|---|---|---|---|---|---|---|---|---|---|---|
| Yokohama B-Corsairs | 2011–12 | 52 | 31 | 21 | .596 | 2nd in Eastern | 5 | 3 | 2 | .600 | 3rd place |
| Yokohama B-Corsairs | 2012–13 | 52 | 35 | 17 | .673 | 2nd in Eastern | 5 | 4 | 1 | .800 | Bj Champions |
| Chiba Jets | 2013–14 | 54 | 18 | 36 | .333 | 6th in Eastern | - | - | - | – | - |
| Chiba Jets | 2014–15 | 54 | 34 | 20 | .630 | 5th in Eastern | 2 | 0 | 2 | .000 | 6th |
| Mitsubishi Electric | 2015–16 | 55 | 27 | 28 | .491 | 7th | 2 | 0 | 2 | .000 | 5th |
| Nagoya Diamond Dolphins | 2016–17 | 60 | 27 | 33 | .450 | 5th in Western | - | - | - | – | - |
