= Patrick Sanders (basketball) =

American professional basketball player (born 1985)

Personal information
- Born: August 27, 1985 (age 41) Corona, California, U.S.
- Listed height: 6 ft 6 in (1.98 m)
- Listed weight: 205 lb (93 kg)

Career information
- High school: Orange (Orange, California)
- College: UC Irvine (2004–2008)
- NBA draft: 2008: undrafted
- Playing career: 2008–2022
- Position: Small forward

Career history
- 2008–2009: Iowa Energy
- 2010: Amsterdam
- 2010: VEF Rīga
- 2010–2011: Sydney Kings
- 2012: Dakota Wizards
- 2012: Rayos de Hermosillo
- 2012–2013: Étoile de Charleville-Mézières
- 2013: Rayos de Hermosillo
- 2013–2015: Shinshu Brave Warriors
- 2015: Iwate Big Bulls
- 2015–2019: Club Ferro Carril Oeste
- 2021–2022: North Bears Sidney

Career highlights
- 2× CIBACOPA champion (2012, 2013); First-team All-Big West (2008)

Patrick Elliot Sanders (born August 27, 1985) is an American professional basketball player who currently plays for Club Ferro Carril Oeste of the Argentine Liga Nacional de Básquet. He played college basketball for UC-Irvine.

== College career ==
Sanders arrived at UC-Irvine after averaging 17 points and 12 rebounds per game in high school. His freshman year saw him receive minimal playing time, with Sanders averaging 1.7 points and 1.6 rebounds per game. As a sophomore, he broke into the starting lineup in the second part of the year. He went to start 19 of the final 20 games for the Anteaters.

As a junior, he led the Anteaters in scoring and was named honorable mention All-Big West Conference for an effort that saw him average 11.9 points and 1.6 blocks (ranking second in the league) per game. As a senior, he was named first-team All-Big West after leading the Anteaters with 15.8 points per game. He finished sixth in the conference in scoring, third in three-point field goal percentage, sixth in field-goal percentage, and seventh in free-throw percentage.

In Big West conference play, Sanders ranked fourth in scoring at 17.8 points per game, seventh in field goal percentage shooting at .486, fourth in free throw percentage at .861, and sixth in three-point percentage at .463.

== Professional career ==
After going undrafted in the 2008 NBA draft, Sanders joined the Sacramento Kings for the 2008 NBA Summer League. He later joined the Iowa Energy of the NBA Development League in November 2008, where he spent the 2008–09 season until being waived by the Energy on March 23, 2009, due to injury. In 41 games for the Energy (36 starts), he averaged 13.9 points, 3.6 rebounds and 1.4 assists per game. On January 22, 2009, Sanders scored 43 points in the Energy's 142–140 double overtime win over the Dakota Wizards.

The injury kept him out of action for 10 months, signing with Amsterdam Basketball Club in January 2010 for the rest of the 2009–10 season. In 20 games for Amsterdam, he averaged 14.8 points, 4.6 rebounds, 2.1 assists, 1.4 steals and 1.1 blocks per game.

On July 30, 2010, Sanders signed a one-year deal with VEF Rīga of the Latvian Basketball League. He later parted ways with the club in mid-November after appearing in 11 games. On November 25, he signed with the Sydney Kings for the rest of the 2010–11 NBL season. In 21 games for the Kings, he averaged 13.3 points, 4.0 rebounds and 1.7 assists per game.

On January 12, 2012, Sanders was acquired by the Dakota Wizards of the NBA Development League, only to be waived by the team 10 days later after appearing in five games. He later joined Rayos de Hermosillo for the 2012 CIBACOPA season. In 53 games for Hermosillo, he averaged 19.0 points, 4.1 rebounds and 1.4 assists per game, helping the team win their first league championship.

In August 2012, Sanders signed with Étoile de Charleville-Mézières of France for the 2012–13 season. In February 2013, he left Charleville-Mézières and returned to Mexico where he re-joined Rayos de Hermosillo. In 21 games for the French club, he averaged 17.2 points, 4.4 rebounds and 1.1 assists per game. He went on to help Hermosillo win back-to-back championships in 2013 with averages of 14.9 points, 3.0 rebounds and 1.6 assists in 46 games.

Sanders joined the Shinshu Brave Warriors of the Japanese bj league for the 2013–14 season, averaging 18.3 points, 4.9 rebounds and 2.2 assists in 54 games. He returned to Shinshu for the 2014–15 season, again averaging impressive numbers with 18.9 points, 5.6 rebounds, 2.1 assists and 1.1 steals in 48 games.

In August 2015, Sanders signed with Club Ferro Carril Oeste of the Argentine Liga Nacional de Básquet.

== Career statistics ==
Legend
GP	Games played	GS	Games started	MPG	Minutes per game
FG%	Field goal percentage	3P%	3-point field goal percentage	FT%	Free throw percentage
RPG	Rebounds per game	APG	Assists per game	SPG	Steals per game
BPG	Blocks per game	PPG	Points per game	**Bold**	Career high

Year	Team	GP	GS	MPG	FG%	3P%	FT%	RPG	APG	SPG	BPG	PPG
2013–14	Shinshu	52	10	27.8	40.6	36.7	83.6	5.0	2.2	1.0	0.3	18.3
2014–15	Shinshu	48	48	30.7	43.9	39.6	85.2	5.6	2.1	1.1	0.4	18.9
2015–16	Iwate	41	22	22.6	47.5	42.9	79.8	5.5	1.2	0.8	0.6	13.1
