= Masashi Hosoya =

Japanese basketball player

Masashi Hosoya 細谷 将司
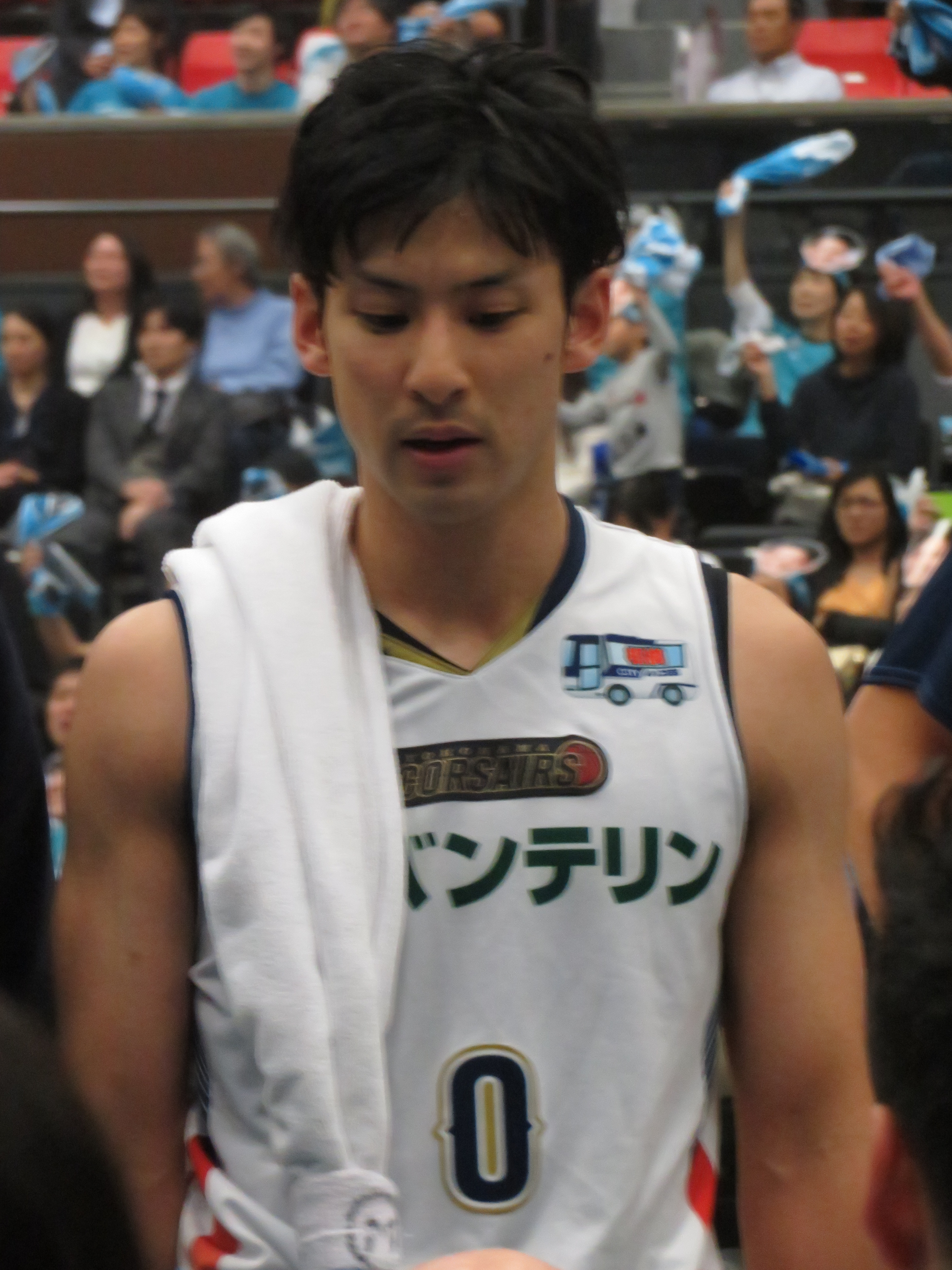
- Hosoya with Yokohama in 2018

No. 0 – Fukui Blowinds
- Position: Point guard
- League: B.League

Personal information
- Born: October 2, 1989 (age 37) Ninomiya, Kanagawa, Japan
- Listed height: 5 ft 9 in (1.75 m)
- Listed weight: 160 lb (73 kg)

Career information
- High school: Hatano Minamigaoka (Hadano, Kanagawa)
- College: Kanto Gakuin University (2008–2012)
- Playing career: 2012–present

Career history
- 2012–2014: TGI D-Rise
- 2014-2015: Hyogo Storks
- 2015-2016: Tsukuba Robots
- 2016-2019: Yokohama B-Corsairs
- 2019-2021: Akita Northern Happinets
- 2021-2023: SeaHorses Mikawa
- 2023-present: Fukui Blowinds

Career highlights
- B.League All-Star (2020)

Masashi Hosoya (born October 2, 1989), nicknamed Mashi, is a Japanese professional basketball player who plays for the SeaHorses Mikawa of the B.League in Japan. He played college basketball for Kanto Gakuin University. On October 9, 2016, he recorded a career-high 39 points in a win to the San-en NeoPhoenix. The Ninomiya town native played soccer in his youth, and he is good at ball juggling.

== Career statistics ==
Legend
GP	Games played	GS	Games started	MPG	Minutes per game
FG%	Field goal percentage	3P%	3-point field goal percentage	FT%	Free throw percentage
RPG	Rebounds per game	APG	Assists per game	SPG	Steals per game
BPG	Blocks per game	PPG	Points per game	**Bold**	Career high

=== Regular season ===
Year	Team	GP	GS	MPG	FG%	3P%	FT%	RPG	APG	SPG	BPG	TO	PPG
2012-13	TGI・D-Rise												
2013-14	TGI・D-Rise	32	31	35.2	.397	.354	.805	0.3	3.4	0.8	0.1	3.4	16.9
2014-15	Hyogo	52	8	13.0	.319	.269	.875	0.1	0.7	0.2	0.0	0.6	3.1
2015-16	Tsukuba	53	35	24.9	.393	.335	.771	0.3	2.2	0.5	0.0	1.8	8.2
2016-17	Yokohama	56	42	26.8	.405	.364	.782	0.4	2.3	0.6	0.1	1.3	7.1
2017-18	Yokohama	58	47	23.2	.398	.356	.857	0.2	3.3	0.7	0.0	1.3	7.1
2018-19	Yokohama	55	8	19.9	.404	.353	.763	1.4	2.2	0.5	0.0	1.1	7.2
2019-20	Akita	37	12	18.6	.408	.347	.806	1.5	2.9	0.5	0.0	1.2	8.6
2020-21	Akita	59	4	13.9	.384	.325	.904	0.6	1.8	0.2	0.0	0.9	6.5

=== Playoffs ===
Year	Team	GP	GS	MPG	FG%	3P%	FT%	RPG	APG	SPG	BPG	PPG
2016-17	Yokohama	4	4	20:06	.364	.222	1.000	2.3	1.3	0.25	0.25	5.0
2016-17	Yokohama	1	1	24:12	.333	.200	1.000	4.0	3.0	0.0	0.0	7.0
2017-18	Yokohama	4	3	20:35	.500	.357	1.000	2.0	2.0	0.5	0.0	8.8
2018-19	Yokohama	3	0	6:38	.300	.200	.000	0.0	0.3	0.33	0.0	2.3

=== Early cup games ===
Year	Team	GP	GS	MPG	FG%	3P%	FT%	RPG	APG	SPG	BPG	PPG
2017	Yokohama	2	2	25:53	.364	.286	1.000	2.5	4.0	0.0	0.0	7.0
2018	Yokohama	2	2	24:34	.286	.286	.000	1.5	3.5	0.0	0.0	5.0
2019	Akita	2	0	20:38	.444	.462	.889	2.0	1.0	0.5	0.0	15.0

=== Preseason games ===
Year	Team	GP	GS	MPG	FG%	3P%	FT%	RPG	APG	SPG	BPG	PPG
2019	Akita	3	1	18.8	.448	.389	.667	2.0	2.3	1.7	0.0	13.0

Source: UtsunomiyaToyamaSendai
