= Michael Katsuhisa =

Japanese basketball player and coach

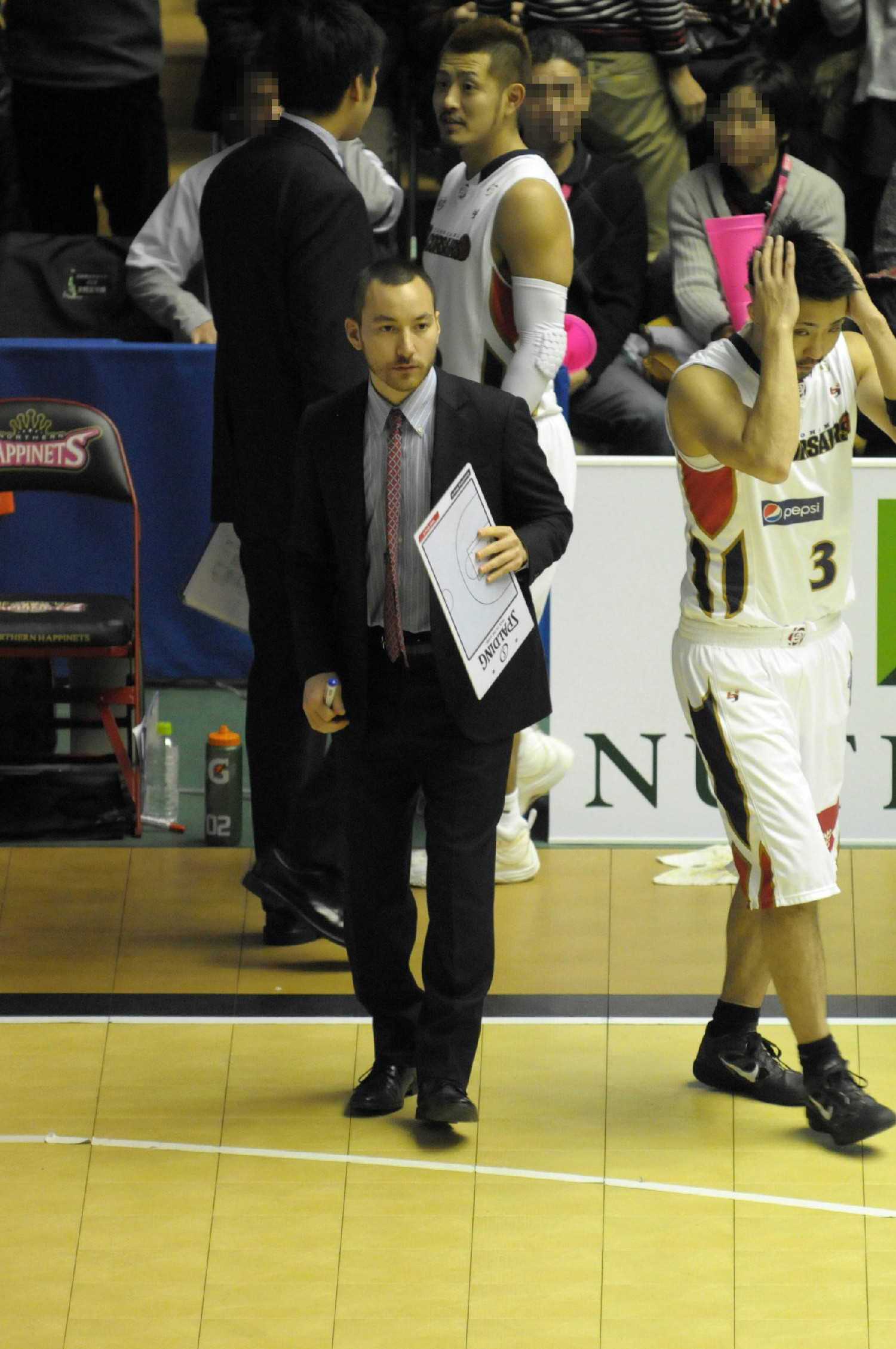

Shinshu Brave Warriors
- Position: Head coach
- League: B.League

Personal information
- Born: April 26, 1983 (age 43) Tokyo, Japan
- Listed height: 171 cm (5 ft 7 in)
- Listed weight: 70 kg (154 lb)

Career information
- High school: Bellevue High School (Bellevue, Washington)
- College: Senshu University
- Playing career: 2009–2011

Career history

Playing
- 2009–2011: Osaka Evessa

Coaching
- 2011–2013: Yokohama B-Corsairs (asst.)
- 2013–2015: Yokohama B-Corsairs
- 2015–2017: Shimane Susanoo Magic
- 2017-2018: Link Tochigi Brex (asst)
- 2018-2026: Shinshu Brave Warriors

Michael Katsuhisa (勝久 マイケル; born April 26, 1983) is a Japanese basketball coach and former professional player. He most recently served as head coach of the Shinshu Brave Warriors from 2018 to 2026. During his eight seasons with Shinshu, the team won the B2 championship in 2018–19, finished first in the B2 Central Division in 2018–19 and 2019–20, finished first in the B2 East Division in 2025-2026, and earned promotion to B1 in 2020. Shinshu recorded a 258–196 regular-season record during his tenure.

Katsuhisa previously coached the Shimane Susanoo Magic. In 2016–17, Shimane finished the regular season 51–9, won the B2 West Division and finished runner-up in B2, earning promotion to B1.

== Early life ==
Katsuhisa was born in Tokyo to a Japanese father and American mother. He attended Nishimachi International School in Tokyo, where his father was the headmaster, then Bellevue High School in Washington, United States.

== Professional career ==
=== As a player ===
Katsuhisa was drafted fifth overall by the Osaka Evessa in the 2009 bj league draft. At the end of his first season he was released as a player and signed as a coach of the Evessa's reserve team. However, injuries to Evessa's main players saw he re-signed as a player in January 2011.

=== As a coach ===
In the 2011 off-season, Katsuhisa left Osaka Evessa to become an assistant coach with the Yokohama B-Corsairs under Reggie Geary. He served as Geary’s assistant during Yokohama’s first two seasons, including its 2012–13 bj-league championship season. After Geary’s departure, Katsuhisa became Yokohama’s head coach. The team finished 24–28 in 2013–14 and 18–34 in 2014–15, missing the playoffs in both seasons.

Katsuhisa became head coach of the Shimane Susanoo Magic in 2015. In 2016–17, Shimane finished the regular season 51–9, placed first in the B2 West Division, finished runner-up in B2 and earned promotion to B1. He served as an assistant coach with the Tochigi Brex in 2017–18 before becoming head coach of the Shinshu Brave Warriors in 2018.

During Katsuhisa’s tenure at Shinshu, the team won the B2 championship and B2 Central Division in 2018–19, then won the B2 Central Division again in 2019–20 and earned promotion to B1. Shinshu finished third in B2 in 2024–25 and won the B2 East Division in 2025–26. The team recorded 258 regular-season wins and 196 losses during his eight seasons as head coach.

== Head coaching record ==
Legend
Regular season	G	Games coached	W	Games won	L	Games lost	W–L %	Win–loss %
Playoffs	PG	Playoff games	PW	Playoff wins	PL	Playoff losses	PW–L %	Playoff win–loss %

Team	Year	G	W	L	W–L%	Finish	PG	PW	PL	PW–L%	Result
Yokohama B-Corsairs	2013-14	52	24	28	.462	7th in Eastern	-	-	-	–	Missed playoffs
Yokohama B-Corsairs	2014-15	52	18	34	.346	10th in Eastern	-	-	-	–	Missed playoffs
Shimane Susanoo Magic	2015-16	52	37	15	.712	3rd in Western	2	0	2	.000	Lost in first round
Shimane Susanoo Magic	2016-17	60	51	9	.850	1st in B2 Western	4	2	2	.500	Runners-up in B2
Shinshu Brave Warriors	2018-19	60	48	12	.800	1st in B2 Central	4	4	0	1.000	B2 Champion
Shinshu Brave Warriors	2019-20	47	40	7	.851	1st in B2 Central	-	-	-	–	-
Shinshu Brave Warriors	2020–21	54	20	34	.370	7th in Western	—	—	—	-	Missed playoffs
Shinshu Brave Warriors	2021–22	54	28	26	.519	5th in Western	—	—	—	-	Missed playoffs
Shinshu Brave Warriors	2022–23	59	29	30	.492	3rd in Central	—	—	—	-	Missed playoffs
Shinshu Brave Warriors	2023–24	60	10	50	.167	7th in Central	—	—	—	-	Relegated to B2
Shinshu Brave Warriors	2024–25	60	37	23	.617	3rd in B2 East	8	4	4	.500	Finished third overall
Shinshu Brave Warriors	2025–26	60	46	14	.767	1st in B2 East	8	3	5	.375	Finished fourth overall

== Personal life ==
Katsuhisa is of Japanese and American heritage. His mother, Sherry, is from Pittsburgh, and his father, Hikojiro, was headmaster of Nishimachi International School in Tokyo from 1991 to 1996. Katsuhisa and his older brother, Geoffrey, attended the school. The family spent three years in Rome during the brothers’ childhood and otherwise lived in Japan; after Geoffrey graduated from Nishimachi, the family moved to the Seattle area, where both brothers attended Bellevue High School. Geoffrey has also worked in Japanese professional basketball as an interpreter and coach. He is currently an associate coach with the Kawasaki Brave Thunders. Katsuhisa is married and has two children. In a 2020 interview, he spoke about his family’s support for his coaching career.
