= White Ring (arena) =

Sporting arena in Nagano, Japan

Coordinates: 36°36′17″N 138°12′23″E

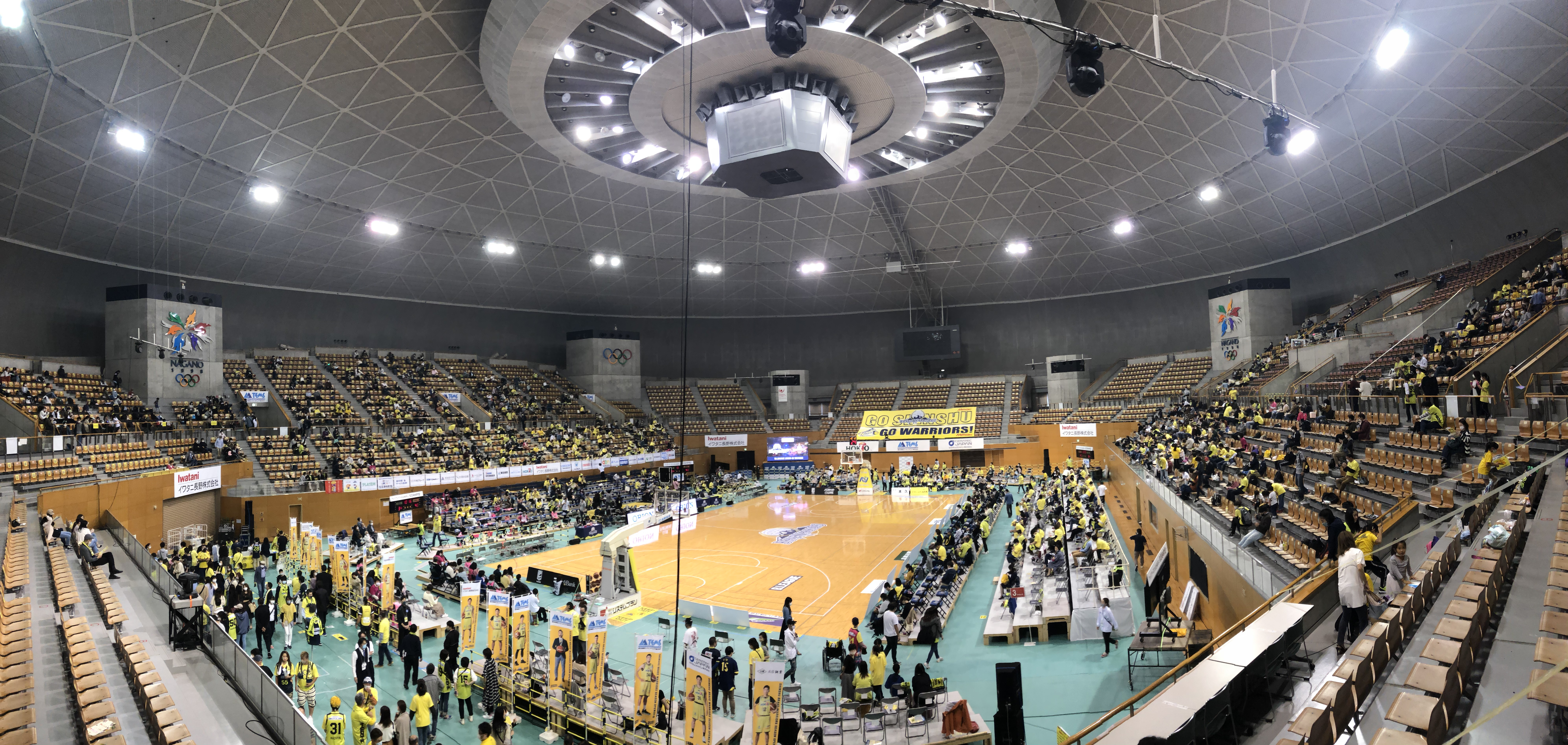
- Shinshu Brave Warriors game v Akita

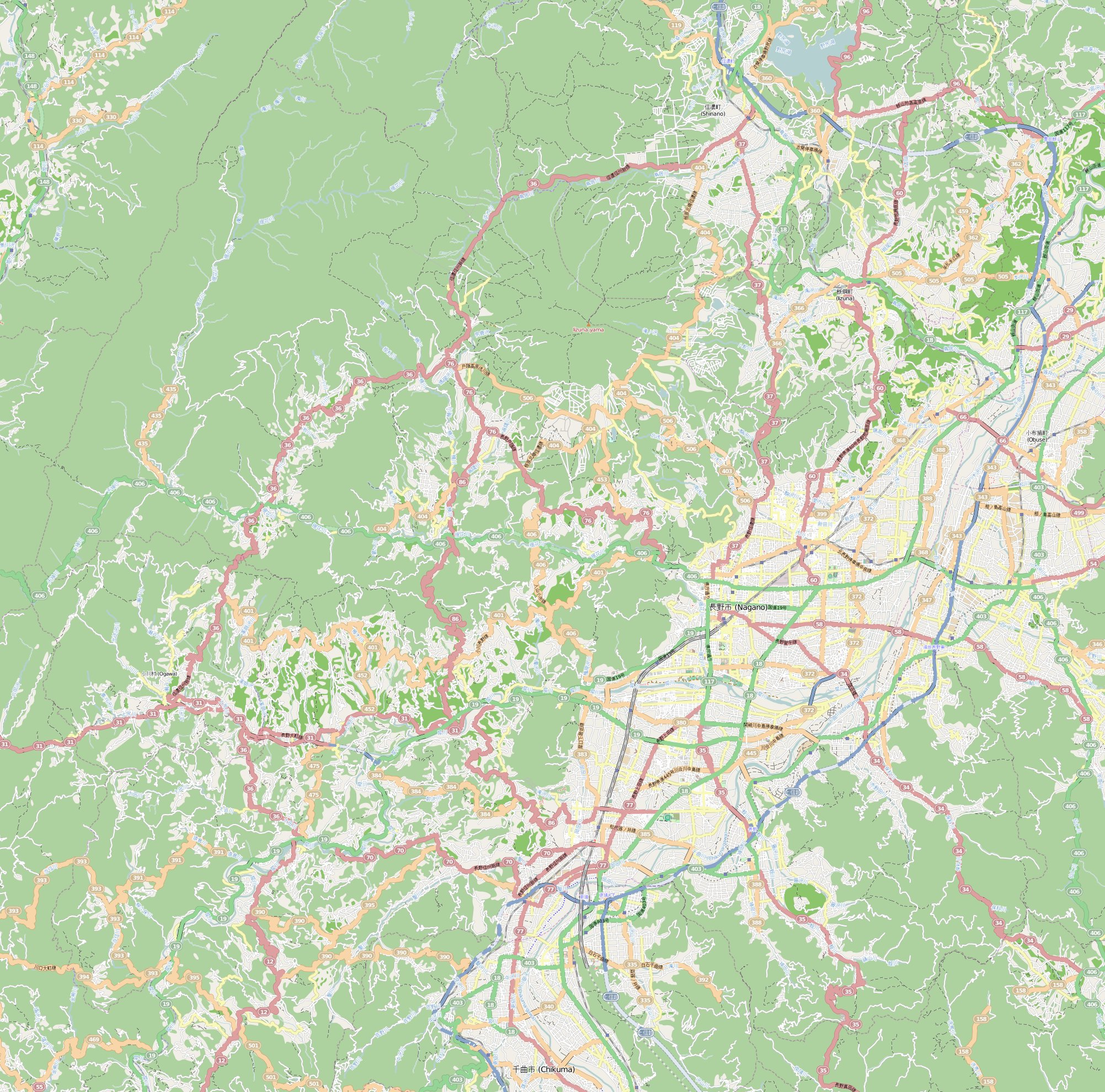
- Location within Nagano, Nagano Location within Nagano Prefecture Location within Japan
- Interactive map of White Ring
- Location: Nagano, Japan
- Owner: City of Nagano
- Operator: Fukushi Enterprise
- Capacity: Basketball: 7,000; Ice hockey / Ice Floor: 5,000

Construction
- Groundbreaking: September, 1993
- Opened: March 29, 1996
- Cost: ¥14.8 billion Japanese yen

Tenants
- Shinshu Brave Warriors (BLG) (2011-present); Boaluz Nagano

The White Ring, officially Nagano City Mashima General Sports Arena, is an indoor sporting arena located in Nagano, Japan. The capacity of the arena is 7,000 people.

It was a venue at the 1998 Winter Olympics, hosting the figure skating and short track speed skating events.

It is the home arena of the Shinshu Brave Warriors of the B.League, Japan's professional basketball league.

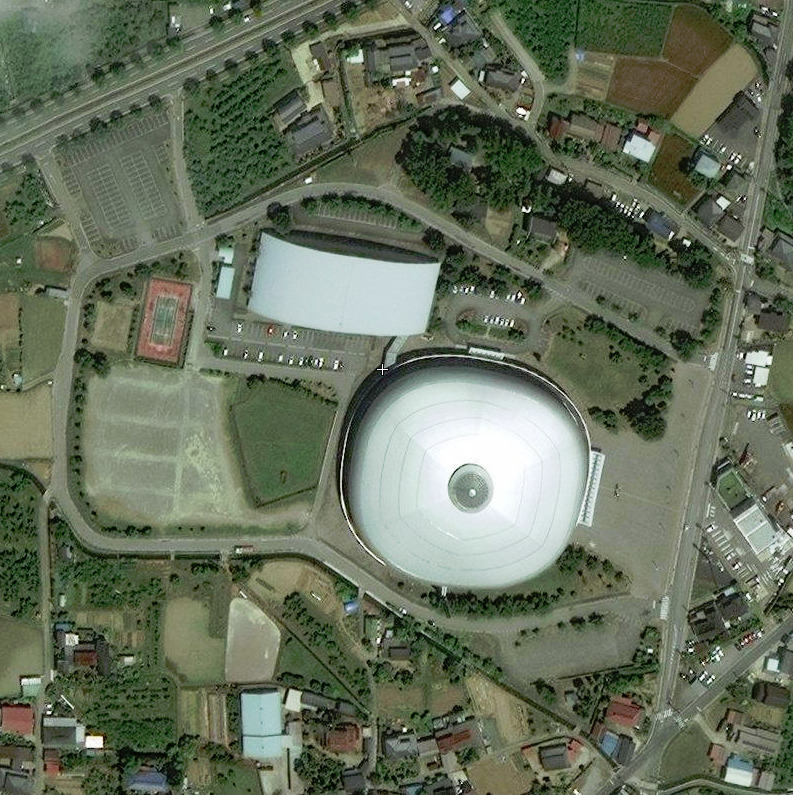
Satellite view
