= Shinshu Brave Warriors =

Professional basketball team in Nagano, Nagano Prefecture, Japan

- Conference: Eastern
- Division: Second
- Leagues: B.League
- Founded: 2011; 15 years ago
- Arena: Mashima General Sports Arena
- Capacity: 7,000
- Location: Nagano
- Head coach: Michael Katsuhisa
- Website: b-warriors.net
Home	Away	3rd

The Shinshu Brave Warriors (信州ブレイブウォリアーズ, Shinshū Bureibuuoriāzu) are a Japanese professional basketball team based in Naganao, Nagano Prefecture. The team most recently competed in the second division of the B.League. Starting from the 2026–27 season, the team will compete in the B.League Premier, the league's highest division, as a member of the Western Conference. The team plays its home games at Mashima General Sports Arena.

The team's name refers to the traditional name for Nagano Prefecture, Shinshu, and the region's history of "warriors," such as those of the Sanada clan, the Togakushi Ninja, Kiso Yoshinaka, and the Battles of Kawanakajima.

== Team Logo ==
The team logo uses three colours; blue (called Warrior Blue), silver (called Japan Alps Silver) and yellow (called Obasute Moon Yellow). It shows the full name of the team with a depiction of the Japanese Alps mountain range (which runs through Nagano) and a basketball shown as a moon coming over the mountains.

== Mascot ==
The team mascot is a bear like creature called "Burea". When pronounced sound like blair or blayer. It probably comes from a combination of Brave and Warriors; Bra-ior. Japanese tend to pronounce the -er as a long a when using English words. His design includes white for the winter snow, crescent moons for eyes and an apple for the nose (Nagano is known for its apples).

== Roster ==
Shinshu Brave Warriors roster
Players
Coaches

Pos.	No.	Nat.	Name	Ht.	Age
F	3	(Japan)	Eliet Donley	1.98 m (6 ft 6 in)	29 – 11 December 1996
F	4	(Japan)	Taichi Kodama	1.85 m (6 ft 1 in)	26 – 17 June 2000
G	5	(Japan)	Fuki Yamamoto	1.77 m (5 ft 10 in)	27 – 9 August 1998
F	7	(United States)	Stanton Kidd	2.02 m (6 ft 8 in)	34 – 18 March 1992
G	11	(Japan)	Kaito Ishikawa	1.70 m (5 ft 7 in)	35 – 30 November 1990
G	12	(Japan)	Louis Kurihara	1.88 m (6 ft 2 in)	29 – 3 November 1996
F	13	(Japan)	Matthew Aquino	2.05 m (6 ft 9 in)	29 – 28 September 1996
G	14	(Japan)	Kyosuke Hoshino	1.84 m (6 ft 0 in)	27 – 1 June 1999
F	21	(Ivory Coast)	Deon Thompson	2.04 m (6 ft 8 in)	37 – 16 September 1988
G	30	(Guam)	Takumi Simon	1.90 m (6 ft 3 in)	26 – 10 March 2000
F	31	(Japan)	Kazuya Mitsui	1.90 m (6 ft 3 in)	32 – 2 June 1994
G	46	(Japan)	Shusuke Ikuhara	1.82 m (6 ft 0 in)	32 – 24 May 1994
C	50	(United States)	Wayne Marshall	2.11 m (6 ft 11 in)	40 – 7 January 1986
PF		(United States)	Mike Daum	2.06 m (6 ft 9 in)	30 – 30 October 1995

Head coach

Michael Katsuhisa

Assistant coach(es)

Satoshi Hisayama
Yusuke Inoue

Legend

- (C) Team captain
- Injured

- Roster
Updated: 23 January 2023

== Notable players ==
- Jamal Boykin
- Suleiman Braimoh
- Marcus Cousin
- Jaye Crockett
- Josh Dollard
- Xavier Gibson
- Tyler Hughes
- Terrence Jennings
- Jeroen van der List
- Anthony McHenry
- Chad Posthumus
- Derek Raivio
- Lee Roberts
- Patrick Sanders
- Terrence Shannon
- Nick Washburn
- DeVaughn Washington

== Coaches ==
- Motofumi Aoki
- Takatoshi Ishibashi
- Ryuji Kawai
- Koju Munakata
- Ryutaro Onodera
- Michael Katsuhisa

== Arenas ==
- Kotobuki Arena Chikuma
- Chikuma City Togura Gymnasium
- Matsumoto City Gymnasium
- White Ring
- Big Hat
