= Yokohama B-Corsairs =

Professional basketball team in Yokohama, Kanagawa, Japan

- Leagues: B.League
- Founded: 2010; 16 years ago
- History: bj league (2010–2016)
- Arena: Yokohama International Swimming Pool
- Capacity: 5,000
- Location: Yokohama, Kanagawa Prefecture, Japan
- Team colors: Navy blue
- Main sponsor: Weins Group
- President: Eisuke Shirai
- Team manager: Ken Takeda
- Head coach: Lassi Tuovi
- Ownership: Yokohama Sports Entertainment Co., Ltd.
- Championships: 1 (2012–13 bj league)
- Retired numbers: 2 (3, 13)
- Website: b-corsairs.com
| Home | Away |

The Yokohama B-Corsairs (横浜ビー・コルセアーズ, Yokohama Bii Koruse'a-zu) are a Japanese professional basketball team based in Yokohama. The team competes in the B.League Premier, the highest division of the B.League, as a member of the Eastern Conference. The team plays its home games at Yokohama International Swimming Pool.

Following the team's establishment in 2010, they participated in the Eastern Conference of the bj league for five seasons and in 2013 became the first team based in the Kanto region of Japan to win the league's championship.

== History ==
=== Early success in bj league (2011–2013) ===
The B-Corsairs entered the league in the 2011–2012 season as one of four expansion teams, seeing the league grow from 16 to 20 teams. In their first season they finished in second place in the Eastern Conference, led by league MVP Justin Burrell. Former NBA player Reggie Geary won the coach of the year award. In the playoff series they finished third overall, losing the Eastern Conference Final to the Hamamatsu Higashimikawa Phoenix but defeating the Kyoto Hannaryz in the playoff for third.

The following season the B-Corsairs won the 2012–13 bj-league title, defeating Rizing Fukuoka in the championship game. After again finishing second in the Eastern Conference, they overcame conference leader Niigata Albirex BB in the Eastern Conference Final, with Draelon Burns scoring in the final second of the game. With the victory, Geary became the first foreign-born coach to win a title in the bj-league. Team captain Masayuki Kabaya was named playoff MVP.

=== Descent from playoff contention (2013–2016) ===
The club's initial success came at a financial cost. In the off-season following their championship success, it was reported that the club was in financial difficulty and the ownership changed. Geary left the club to join the Chiba Jets and the B-Corsairs' import players also signed with other clubs within Japan. Geary's assistant Michael Katsuhisa became head coach and Taketo Aoki retired as a player to become an assistant coach. Import players Wayne Marshall, Marquise Gray and Omar Reed joined the club. The 2013–14 season started reasonably well for the club, which was in playoff contention with a 16–17 record, but it slumped at the end of the year and finished with a 24–28 record, missing out on the playoffs for the first time.

Katsuhisa remained as head coach for the 2014–15 season and the team was again led by Kabaya and Marshall. Dzaflo Larkai, Carl Hall and Warren Niles were added as import players. Kenji Yamada was named captain although Kabaya remained with the team. The club struggled throughout the season however, with Marshall missing a quarter of the season due to injury. They finished to 10th place in the Eastern Conference with an 18–34 win–loss record.

At the end of the 2014–15 season Katsuhisa left the club and Aoki became the head coach. Marshall left the club and was replaced by Jordan Henriquez. Cory Johnson and Emanuel Willis were also added to the roster, although Willis was released six games into the 2015–16 season. Yamada continued in the role of team captain for the second season. Satoshi Hisayama, who had been at the club since its beginning in 2011 but was released at the end of the 2014–15 season, returned to the club at the end of October to replace Willis. Small forward Ryoichi Ishitani, who had been with the B-Corsairs training squad since the 2014–15 season, including a previous stint on the main squad between November 2014 and February 2015, was signed to a full contract and added to the main squad in February 2016. After recording a 16–14 win–loss record in the first four months of the season, the team slumped to manage just two wins in its next twenty games. The team finished the season in 10th place in the Eastern Conference for the second consecutive year. At the end of the season the club announced that it would not renew the contracts of Hall and Johnson.

=== B.League ===
From September 2016, the B-Corsairs will compete in the Central Conference of the First Division of the B.League, a new three-division competition formed from the merger of the bj-league and the National Basketball League. During the off-season, Hisayama, who had been with the club since their foundation, announced his retirement as a player, and joined the Shimane Susanoo Magic as a coach under Katsuhisa. Yamada was named as team captain for his third year. Off-season signings included free agents Jeff Parmer (previously with Shiga) and Faye Pape Mour (previously with Niigata), as well as American Jason Washburn, who was previously playing in the Kosovo league in Europe.

== Record by season ==
| League | Season | Regular season | | | | | | Playoffs | Head coach | Ref |
| League | Season | GP | W | L | % | GB | Finish | Playoffs | Head coach | Ref |
|---|---|---|---|---|---|---|---|---|---|---|
| bj-league | 2011–12 | 52 | 31 | 21 | .596 | 6.0 | 2nd East Conf. | Third | Reggie Geary | |
| bj-league | 2012–13 | 52 | 35 | 17 | .673 | 1.0 | 2nd East Conf. | Champions | Reggie Geary | |
| bj-league | 2013–14 | 52 | 24 | 28 | .462 | 18.0 | 7th East Conf. | Did not qualify | Michael Katsuhisa | |
| bj-league | 2014–15 | 52 | 18 | 34 | .346 | 23.0 | 10th East Conf. | Did not qualify | Michael Katsuhisa | |
| bj-league | 2015–16 | 52 | 19 | 33 | .365 | 20.0 | 10th East Conf. | Did not qualify | Taketo Aoki | |
| B.League | 2016–17 | 60 | 16 | 44 | .267 | 33 | 6th East Conf. | Did not qualify | Satoru Furuta | |
| B.League | 2017–18 | 60 | 18 | 42 | .300 | 30 | 6th East Conf. | Did not qualify | Shota Shakuno | |
| B.League | 2018–19 | 60 | 14 | 46 | .233 | 38 | 6th East Conf. | Did not qualify | Thomas Wisman | |
| B.League | 2019–20 | 41 | 11 | 30 | .268 | 20.5 | 5th East Conf. | Did not qualify | Thomas Wisman | |
| B.League | 2020–21 | 59 | 19 | 40 | .322 | 29.5 | 8th East Conf. | Did not qualify | Kyle Milling | |
| B.League | 2021–22 | 57 | 22 | 35 | .375 | 19 | 8th East Conf. | Did not qualify | Taketo Aoki | |
| B.League | 2022–23 | 60 | 33 | 27 | .550 | 7 | 2nd Central Conf. | Semifinals | Taketo Aoki | |
| B.League | 2023–24 | 60 | 24 | 36 | .400 | 22 | 6th Central Conf. | Did not qualify | Taketo Aoki | |
| B.League | 2024–25 | 56 | 23 | 33 | .411 | 22 | 7th Central Conf. | Did not qualify | Lassi Tuovi | |

== Players ==
=== Current roster ===
Yokohama B-Corsairs roster
Players
Coaches

| Pos. | No. | Nat. | Name |
|---|---|---|---|
| F/C | 7 | (Japan) | Danieldan Nnanna |
| PF | 8 | (United States) | Gary Clark |
| G/F | 9 | (Japan) | Yusei Sugiura |
| SG | 14 | (Japan) | Takeru Oba |
| F | 15 | (Philippines) | Kiefer Ravena |
| PG | 18 | (Japan) | Kenta Morii |
| C | 21 | (Estonia) | Maik Kotsar |
| G | 23 | (Japan) | Kai King |
| G/F | 24 | (Japan) | Hiroki Matsuzaki |
| SG | 30 | (Japan) | Sudo Koya |
| F/C | 40 | (United States) | Josh Scott |

Head coach

(Finland) Lassi Tuovi

Assistant coach(es)

(Finland) Jukka Toijala
(Japan) Kenji Yamada

Legend

- (C) Team captain
- Injured

- Roster

=== Individual awards ===
- League MVP:
  - Justin Burrell (2011–12)
  - Yuki Kawamura (2022–23)
- Playoff MVP:
  - Masayuki Kabaya (2012–13)
- League Best Five:
  - Justin Burrell (2011–12)
  - Draelon Burns (2012–13)
  - Yuki Kawamura (2022–23, 2023-23)

=== All-Star selections ===
- Justin Burrell (2011–12)
- Draelon Burns (2012–13)
- Masayuki Kabaya (2013–14)
- Yuki Kawamura (2022–23, 2024–24)

=== Notable players ===
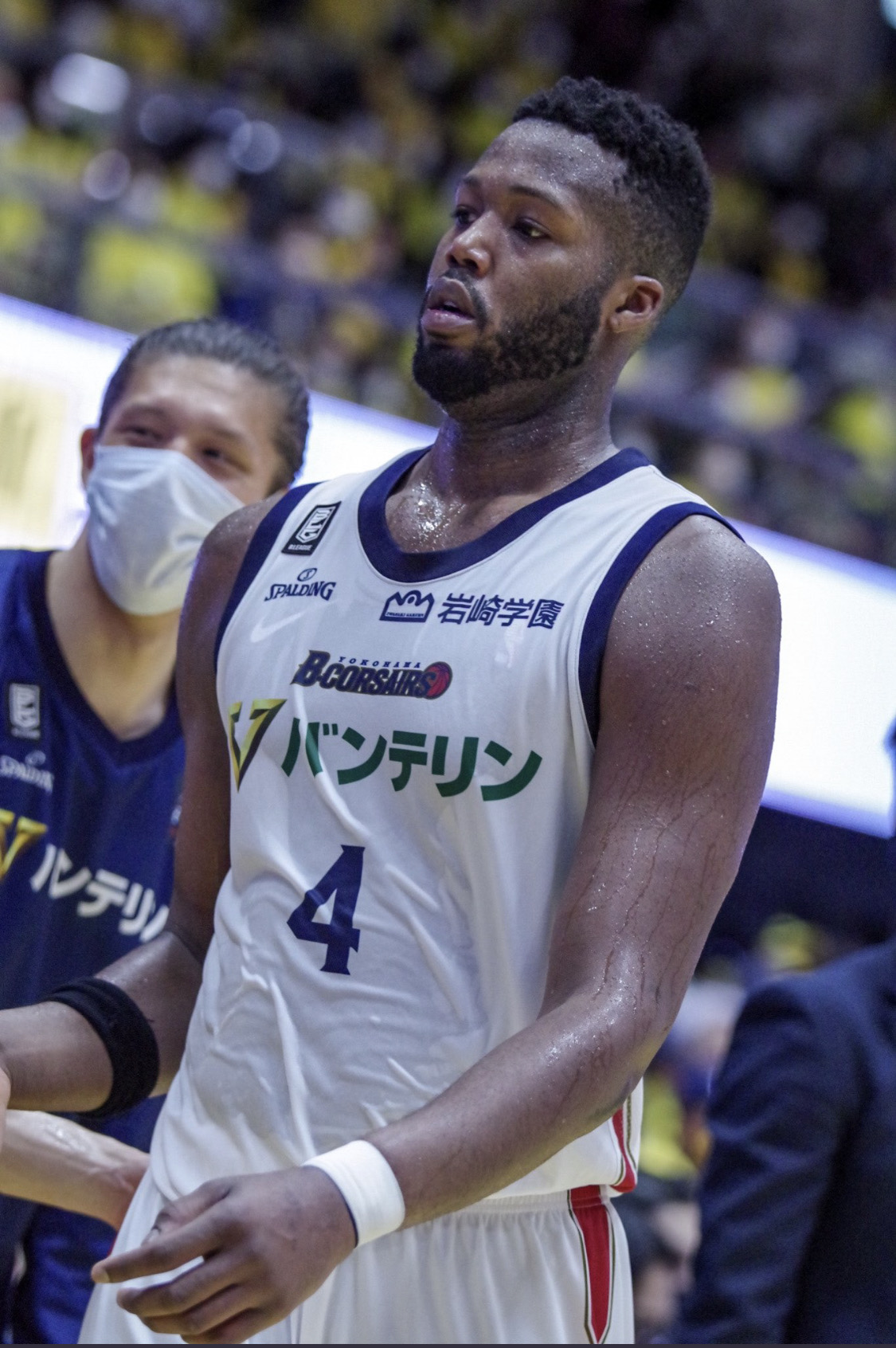
Robert Carter

- (United States) Justin Burrell
- (United States) Paul Butorac
- (United States) Robert Carter
- (United States) Jordan Henriquez
- (Japan) Masashi Hosoya
- (United States) Cory Johnson
- (Japan) Takuya Kawamura
- (United Kingdom) Dzaflo Larkai
- (United States) Khyle Marshall
- (United States) Will McDonald
- (United States) Chas McFarland
- (Japan) Alexis Minatoya
- (United States) Marcus Simmons
- (Tanzania) Hasheem Thabeet
- (United States) Jason Washburn
- (Japan) Kenji Yamada
- (Czech Republic) Patrik Auda
- (Japan) Yuki Kawamura

== Head coaches ==
| Years active | Name | Record (W–L) | Win % | Playoff record (W–L) | Playoff Win % | Playoff Appearances | Conference Titles | League Titles | Notes |
|---|---|---|---|---|---|---|---|---|---|
| 2011–13 | Reggie Geary | 66–38 | .635 | 5–1 | .833 | 2 | 0 | 1 | Named Coach of the year in 2011–12 |
| 2013–15 | Michael Katsuhisa | 42–62 | .404 | 0–0 | - | 0 | 0 | 0 | Assistant coach in 2011–12 and 2012–13 |
| 2015–16 | Taketo Aoki | 19–33 | .365 | 0-0 | - | 0 | 0 | 0 | Played for B-Corsairs in 2011–12 and 2012–13; Assistant Coach in 2013–14 and 2014–15 |
| 2017 | Satoru Furuta | 4–15 | .211 | | | | | | Fired |
| 2017–18 | Shota Shakuno | 15–39 | .277 | | | | | | |
| 2018–20 | Thomas Wisman | 22–70 | .239 | | | | | | Fired |
| 2020 | Shogo Fukuda | 3–2 | .600 | | | | | | |
| 2020–21 | Kyle Milling | 19–40 | .322 | | | | | | |
| 2021–24 | Taketo Aoki | 79–98 | .446 | 2–2 | | 1 | 0 | 0 | |
| 2024– | Lassi Tuovi | | | | | | | | |

== Arenas ==
- Yokohama International Swimming Pool
- Yokohama Cultural Gymnasium, Yokohama United Arena
- Tokkei Security Hiratsuka General Gymnasium

== Practice facilities ==
The team practices at the Takigashira Kaikan in Isogo, Yokohama.
