= Okaerinasai =

Okaerinasai (おかえりなさい) is a Japanese greeting on returning home.

== Music ==
=== Albums ===
- Okaerinasai (album), album by Miyuki Nakajima 1979
- Okaerinasai, album by Cousin

=== Songs ===
- "Okaerinasai" (ja), single by Kikuko Inoue 1994
- "Okaerinasai" (ja) - Maaya Sakamoto 2011
- "Okaerinasai" (song), single by Jun Shibata 2005
- "Okaerinasai", single by Chiyoko Shimakura
- "Okaerinasai", single by duo Humbert Humbert
- "Okaerinasai", single by Funky Monkey Babys
- "Okaerinasai", single by Le Couple
- "Okaerinasai", single by Kumiko (singer)

== Other ==
- Okaerinasaai! (ja), programme by Fukui Television Broadcasting
