= Tonari no Heya =

"隣の部屋 (Tonari no Heya)"

Single by Jun Shibata

from the album Tameiki
- Released: January 29, 2003
- Genre: J-Pop
- Length: 0:11:19
- Label: Dreamusic
- Producer: Jun Shibata

Jun Shibata singles chronology
"Kataomoi" (2002)	"隣の部屋 (Tonari no Heya)" (2003)	"Tameiki" (2003)

"Tonari no Heya" (The Room Next Door) is Jun Shibata's 5th single. It was released on January 29, 2003 and peaked at #17.

== Track listing ==
1. Tonari no heya (隣の部屋; The Room Next Door)
2. Wasuremono (忘れもの; Lost Objects)

== Charts ==
Release	Chart	Peak position	Sales total	Chart run
January 29, 2003	Oricon Daily Singles Chart			
January 29, 2003	Oricon Weekly Singles Chart	17	21,850	7 weeks
January 29, 2003	Oricon Yearly Singles Chart			
