= Miseinen =

"未成年 (Miseinen)"

Single by Jun Shibata

from the album Hitori
- Released: January 28, 2004
- Genre: J-Pop
- Length: 0:12:36
- Label: Dreamusic
- Producer(s): Jun Shibata

Jun Shibata singles chronology
"Anata to no Hibi" (2003)	"未成年 (Miseinen)" (2004)	"Chiisana Boku e" (2004)

"Miseinen" (Underage) is Jun Shibata's 8th single. It was released on January 28, 2004 and peaked at #20.

== Track listing ==
1. Miseinen (未成年; Miseinen)
2. Shiawase na uta (幸せなうた; Happy Song)
3. Circus ga yatte kita ~ Piano Solo~ (サーカスがやってきた ～Piano Solo～; The Circus Has Arrived: Piano Solo)

== Charts ==
Release	Chart	Peak position	Sales total
January 28, 2004	Oricon Weekly Singles Chart	20	17,015
