= Chiisana Boku e =

"ちいさなぼくへ (Chiisana Boku e)"

Single by Jun Shibata

from the album Watashi
- Released: November 25, 2004
- Genre: J-Pop
- Length: 0:12:23
- Label: Dreamusic
- Songwriter: Junko Shibata
- Producer: Jun Shibata

Jun Shibata singles chronology
"Miseinen" (2004)	"ちいさなぼくへ (Chiisana Boku e)" (2004)	"Shiroi Sekai" (2005)

"Chiisana Boku e" (To the Small Me) is Jun Shibata's 9th single. It was released on November 25, 2004, and peaked at #22.

== Track listing ==
1. Chiisana boku e (ちいさなぼくへ; To the Small Me)
2. Hikari (光; Light)

== Charts ==
Release	Chart	Peak position	Sales total	Chart run
November 25, 2004	Oricon Daily Singles Chart			
November 25, 2004	Oricon Weekly Singles Chart	22	12,890	4 weeks
November 25, 2004	Oricon Yearly Singles Chart			
