= Hachioji Academy =

Coordinates: 35°43′57″N 139°45′54″E

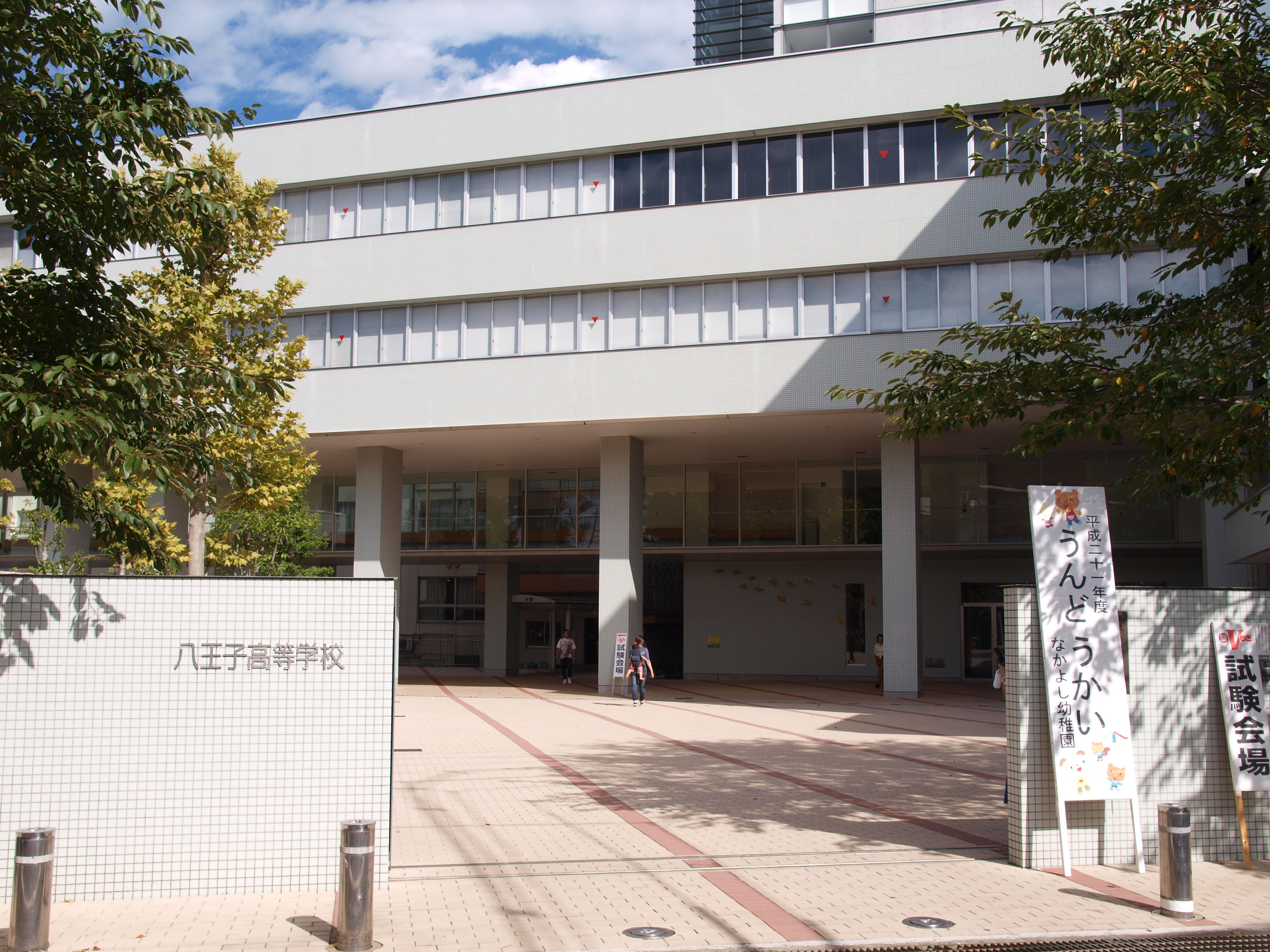

Location
- Hachioji, Tokyo, Japan

Information
- Type: Private
- Established: 1928
- Headmaster: Hirofumi Sato
- Grades: 7-12
- Website: https://www.hachioji.ed.jp/senr/index.php

The Hachioji Academy (八王子学園) is a preparatory private secondary school located in Hachioji, Tokyo, Tokyo, Japan. Also known as Hachioji Gakuen Hachioji Junior and Senior Highschool.

== Overview ==
Hachioji High School is a private, co-educational senior high school located in Hachioji city, 35 kilometers west of central Tokyo, just five minutes walk from Nishi-Hachioji station on the Chuo line. It was founded in 1928 and is now one of the largest senior high schools in the Tokyo Metropolitan area. The school has a roll of over 2000 students aged between 16 and 18 years old.

== Study ==
The school is ranked 8th/447 in Tokyo also 66th/5233 in Japan in 2017. The school has 72 standard score. It indicates that student should perform better than at least 99% of the population of the generation in Japan. The school provides 5 courses.

- Special Advance Science Course/ Special Advance Arts Course
- Advanced Course
- General Course
- Art/Music Course
- Athlete Course

== Sports and Club ==
Hachioji High School offers and encourages students to join one of many cultural and sport clubs that are available. Hachioji High School's baseball, swimming, basketball and soccer teams are particularly strong. Also, the wind orchestra is highly regarded. Most sports teams go on to represent the school at national-level competitions.

== Notable alumni ==
- Kenji Hilke, - a professional basketball player
- Hiroki Hasegawa, is an actor.
- DJChemical, is DJ of Funky Monkey Babys.
- Naoya Ogawa, is a Japanese former world judo champion, Olympic silver medalist, professional wrestler and mixed martial artist.
- Kazuya Kaneda, is an Olympic swimmer.
- Takeshi Tada, - a professional basketball player
- Masami Tanaka, is an Olympic Swimmer, Olympic Bronze medalist.
- Elhadji Wade (fr) - a professional basketball player for Akita Northern Happinets
- Tsuyoshi Yasuda, is a manga artist.

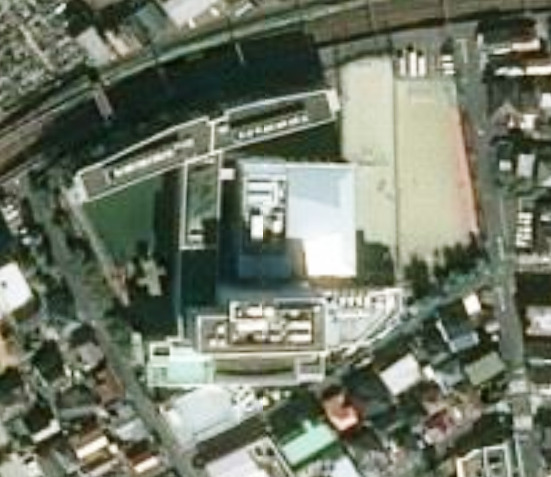
Satellite view
