= Hiromi (song) =

Single by Jun Shibata

from the album Tsukiyo no Ame
- Released: January 11, 2007
- Genre: J-Pop
- Length: 10:59
- Label: Victor Entertainment
- Songwriter: Junko Shibata
- Producer: Jun Shibata

Jun Shibata singles chronology
"Guren no Tsuki" (2006)	"Hiromi" (2007)	"Colorful" (2007)

"Hiromi" is Jun Shibata's 14th single and first to break into the Top 5. It was released on January 11, 2007, and peaked at #5. A short film starring Shibata herself was also based on this song.

== Track listing ==
1. Hiromi ^{1} ^{2}
2. Ato sukoshi dake... (あと少しだけ・・・; Just a Little More...)

^{1} Hiromi is a Japanese unisex name.
^{2} Hiromi is the only Jun Shibata song to have a title in Latin characters.

== Charts ==
Release	Chart	Peak position	Sales total	Chart run
January 11, 2007	Oricon Daily Singles Chart	2		
January 11, 2007	Oricon Weekly Singles Chart	5	17,388	5 weeks
January 11, 2007	Oricon Yearly Singles Chart			
