= Futari (song) =

"ふたり (Futari)"

Single by Jun Shibata

from the album Shin'ai Naru Kimi e
- Released: May 28, 2008
- Genre: J-Pop
- Length: 0:09:09
- Label: Victor Entertainment
- Producer: Jun Shibata

Jun Shibata singles chronology
"Colorful" (2007)	"ふたり (Futari)" (2008)	"Ai wo Suru Hito - Orochi's Theme" (2008)

"Futari" (Us) is Jun Shibata's 16th single. It was released on May 28, 2008 and peaked at #15 according to ORICON NEWS. The single was released under record label Victor Entertainment.

Credit for the song go to Jun Shibata and Takefumi Haketa.

The album is a slow and deliberate “Jun Shibata,” with a simple piano performance by Takeshi Hageta. The recording engineer is ROB FEASTER (Billy Joel, Whitney Houston, No Doubt, Jack Jackson, etc.), who is active worldwide, and the sound quality has been further improved!

== Track listing ==
No.	Title	Length
1.	"Futari"	4:27
2.	"Takaramono"	4:39
Total length:		9:06

1. Futari (ふたり; Us)
2. Takaramono (宝物; Treasure)

== Charts ==
Release	Chart	Peak position	Sales total	Chart run
May 28, 2008	Oricon Daily Singles Chart	7		
May 28, 2008	Oricon Weekly Singles Chart	15	8,682	4 weeks
May 28, 2008	Oricon Yearly Singles Chart			
