= Colorful (Jun Shibata song) =

"カラフル (Colorful)"

Single by Jun Shibata

from the album Shin'ai Naru Kimi e
- Released: September 12, 2007
- Genre: J-Pop
- Length: 0:10:33
- Label: Victor Entertainment
- Producer: Jun Shibata

Jun Shibata singles chronology
"Hiromi" (2007)	"カラフル (Colorful)" (2007)	"Futari" (2008)

"Colorful" is Jun Shibata's 15th single. It was released on September 12, 2007 and peaked at #15.

== Track listing ==
1. Colorful (カラフル; Colorful)
2. Moufu no naka (もうふのなか; Inside the Blanket)

== Charts ==
Release	Chart	Peak position	Sales total	Chart run
September 12, 2007	Oricon Daily Singles Chart	10		
September 12, 2007	Oricon Weekly Singles Chart	15	12,940	5 weeks
September 12, 2007	Oricon Yearly Singles Chart			
