= Shiroi Sekai =

"白い世界 (Shiroi Sekai)"

Single by Jun Shibata

from the album Watashi
- Released: February 23, 2005
- Genre: J-Pop
- Length: 0:10:20
- Label: Dreamusic
- Producer: Jun Shibata

Jun Shibata singles chronology
"Chiisana Boku e" (2004)	"白い世界 (Shiroi Sekai)" (2005)	"Maboroshi/Okaerinasai." (2005)

"Shiroi Sekai" ("White World") is Jun Shibata's tenth single. It was released on February 23, 2005, and peaked at #31 in Japan.

== Track listing ==
1. Shiroi Sekai(白い世界; White World)
2. Shuuden (終電; Last Train)

== Charts ==
Release	Chart	Peak position	Sales total	Chart run
February 23, 2005	Oricon Daily Singles Chart			
February 23, 2005	Oricon Weekly Singles Chart	31	9,858	4 weeks
February 23, 2005	Oricon Yearly Singles Chart			
