= Ai o Suru Hito =

"愛をする人 - Orochi's Theme (Ai o Suru Hito)"

Single by Jun Shibata

from the album Shin'ai Naru Kimi e
- Released: September 17, 2008
- Genre: J-Pop
- Length: 0:11:12
- Label: Victor Entertainment
- Producer: Jun Shibata

Jun Shibata singles chronology
"Futari" (2008)	"愛をする人 - Orochi's Theme (Ai o Suru Hito)" (2008)

Alternative covers
- First Press cover

"Ai o Suru Hito - Orochi's Theme" is Jun Shibata's 17th recut single. It was released on 17 September 2008 and peaked at #13. It was chosen as theme song for the movie Orochi, starring Yoshino Kimura.

== Track listing ==
1. Ai o Suru Hito - Orochi's Theme (愛をする人; People Who Make Love)
2. Otou-san yori. (お父さんより。; From Dad.)

== Charts ==
Release	Chart	Peak position	Sales total	Chart run
17 September 2008	Oricon Daily Singles Chart	9		
17 September 2008	Oricon Weekly Singles Chart	13	9,377	5 weeks
17 September 2008	Oricon Yearly Singles Chart			
