= Doll Elements =

Japanese female idol group

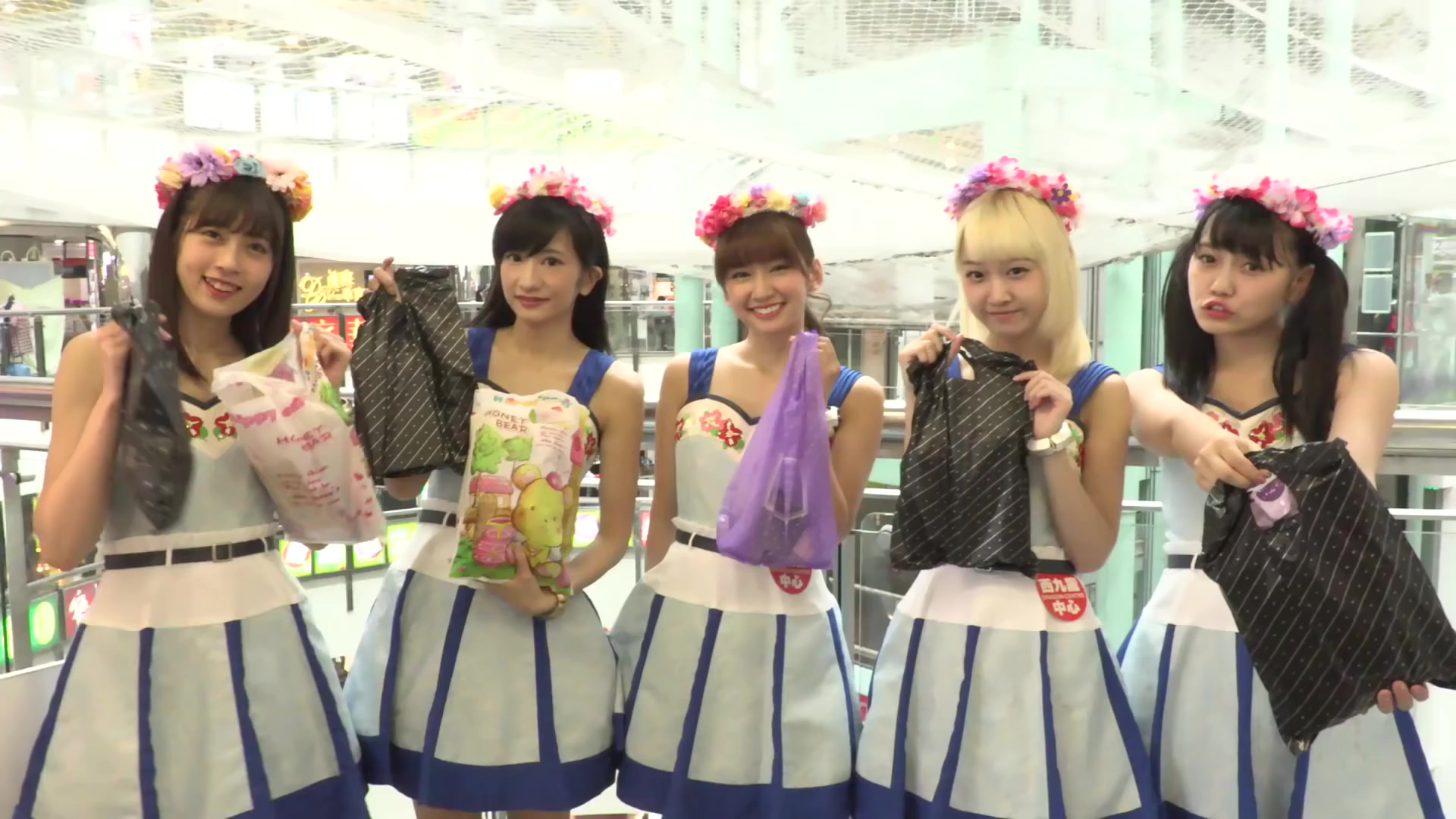

Background information
- Also known as: Doruere
- Origin: Japan
- Genres: J-pop, pop
- Years active: 2011–2017
- Labels: Arc Jewel (September 2012 – July 2013); Dreamusic (July 2013 –)
- Website: www.doll-elements.com

Doll Elements is a Japanese female idol group. It was formed as a unit consisting of 3rd generation trainees of the group Lovely Doll.

On July 3, 2013, Doll Elements debuted on the major label Dreamusic with their single "Kimi no Heart ni Toki Hanatsu!". The group disbanded on January 14, 2017.

== Members ==
- Natsumi Gonda (権田夏海)
- Rika Tonosaki (外崎梨香)
- Runa Kojima (小島瑠那)
- Yukino Komori (小森ゆきの)
- Haruka Koizumi (小泉遥)

=== Former member ===
- Anna Tamechika (為近あんな)
- Aoi Ayamori (綾森あおい)

== Discography ==
=== Singles ===
Title	Release date	Oricon Weekly Single Chart	Notes
Indies
"Miracle Elements"	September 25, 2012	25	
"Miracle Elements / Dolly Kiss"	November 28, 2012	—	
"Gyutto Star!!" (ギュッとStar!!)	March 19, 2013	15	Reached 10,000 copies. "Gyutto Star!!" music video "Kokuhaku Taisō" music video
Major
"Kimi no Heart ni Toki Hanatsu!" (君のハートに解き放つ！)	July 3, 2013	10	Opening theme of Rank Ōkoku in June–July 2013; Music video
"Kimi no Koto Mamoritai!" (君のコト守りたい！)	October 16, 2013	15	Ending theme of Selection X Music video
"Kimi no Tonari de Odoritai!" (君のトナリで踊りたい！)	April 2, 2014	11	Music Dragon Power Play (NTV, March 14 – April 4, 2014); 7th place in the Oricon Daily Single Ranking on April 1, 2014; Music video
