= Kataomoi =

Kataomoi means "unrequited love" in Japanese. It may refer to:

- Kataomoi (album), a 1997 album and its title song by Mayumi Iizuka
- "Kataomoi" (Jun Shibata song), 2002
- "Kataomoi" (Michiru Maki song), 1969, covered by Mie Nakao, and Akina Nakamori
- "Kataomoi", a 2012 single and its title song by Miwa
- "Kataomoi", a 2017 song by Japanese singer Aimer
- "Kataomoi"(片想い), a song by Tatsuro Yamashita from the 1991 album Artisan
