= Yukino Komori =

Japanese idol

Yukino Komori 小森 ゆきの
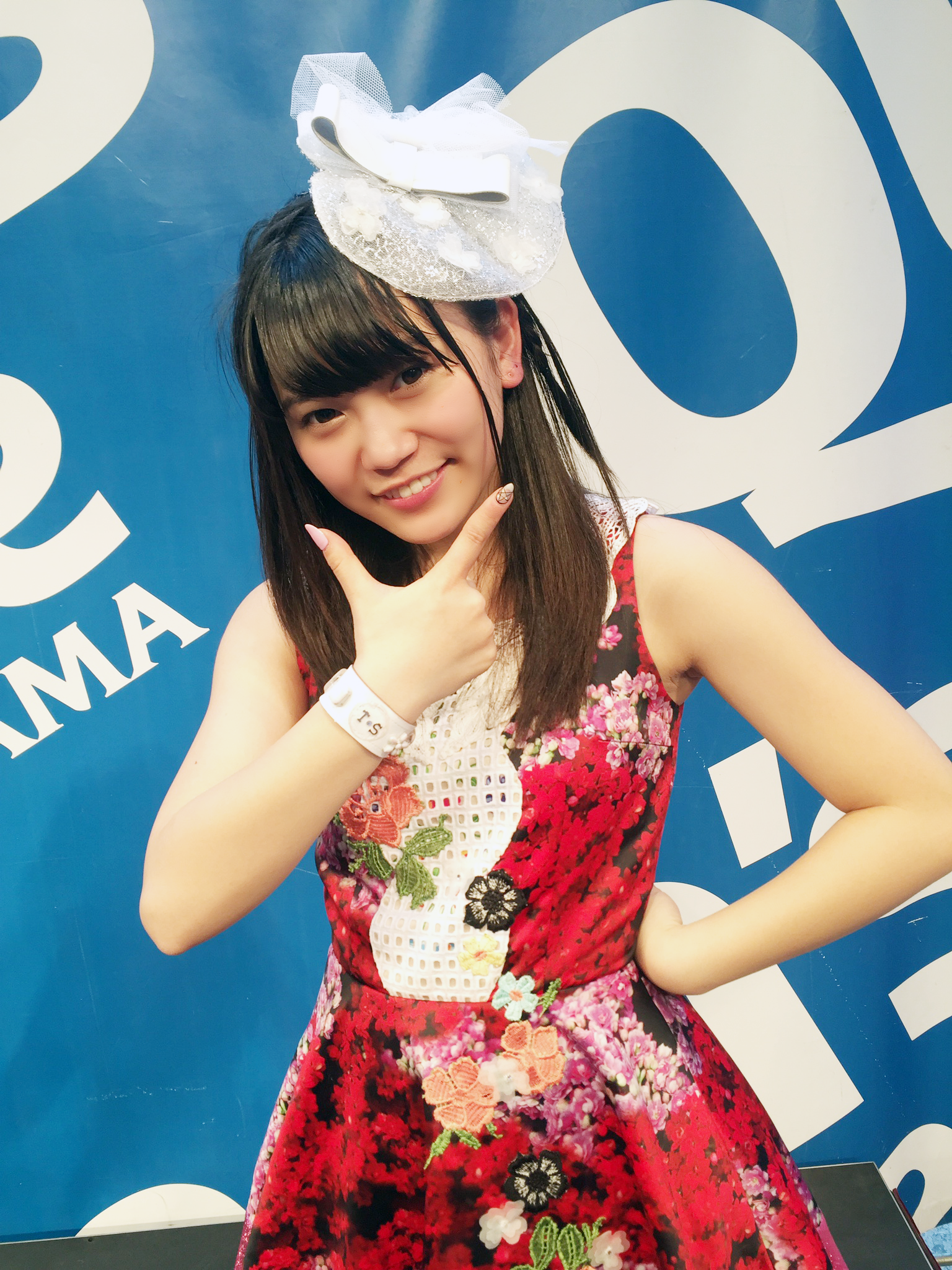
- Komori at Queens Square Yokohama, February 13, 2016

Background information
- Also known as: Yukinon (ゆきのん); DJ KOOMORI
- Born: Yukino Komori; December 5, 1996 (age 28); Chiba Prefecture, Japan
- Genres: J-Pop
- Occupations: Japanese idol; Singer; DJ
- Years active: 2013–2017
- Labels: Dreamusic
- Website: www.doll-elements.com/profile/yukino_komori

Yukino Komori (小森 ゆきの, Komori Yukino; born December 5, 1996 in Chiba Prefecture) is a former Japanese idol and was a member of a female idol group Doll☆Elements. She was the youngest member of the group. Her self introduction was "Everyday, I go Yuki-nonstop! I am the energetic girl in Doll☆Elements! Yukino Komori a.k.a Yukinon!" (今日も最後まで、ゆきのンストップ！ どるえれの元気っ子、ゆきのんこと小森ゆきのです) Her signature color in the group was green.

== Early life ==
Yukino Komori was born on December 6, 1996, in Chiba prefecture, Japan.

Komori has been taking dance classes since the age of five until she joined Doll☆Elements at sixteen. She has learned dance styles such as classic ballet, hip-hop, jazz dance and hip-hop jazz. She has wanted to be an idol because she liked to stand in front of people and dance.

As a child, Komori was a fan of a Japanese idol group, Morning Musume. Her favorite member was Riho Sayashi and Haruka Kudo. She was also a fan of AKB48 and she admires Yuko Oshima. Komori had mentioned that she wants to be a person like Oshima, who can energise many people through television. This is also a reason she wanted to be an idol.

== Career ==
Komori auditioned for the Doll☆Elements audition which took place from April 2013. On November 10, she was revealed as the new member of Doll☆Elements at a concert which was held in the Akihabara UDX Theater. This day, she was introduced during the encore and performed "Kimi no Heart ni Toki Hanatsu!" and "Kimi no Koto Mamoritai!". During the audition, Komori had been thinking that this audition will be her last chance to audition for a Japanese idol group. Therefore, she mentioned on her blog that if she failed for Doll☆Elements, she wouldn't have been an idol

On November 9, 2015, it was announced that she will be taking place as a regular member of an internet TV show; "Instant Johnson no Shall We Conte?". This was her first solo TV show appearance.

Komori announced her retirement on her blog on October 30, 2016. She noticed that her retirement will take place on January 14, 2017, at Zepp Tokyo when Doll☆Elements makes their final performance as a group.

=== DJ KOOMORI ===
Komori sometimes performs as a DJ on events, such as concerts and idol festivals. She goes by the name of DJ KOOMORI. She has performed as a DJ for the first time on August 3, 2015, when Doll☆Elements took part in an idol festival; "IDOL NATION x Tokyo Idol Festival ~KOO MEETS IDOL Kohai Daishugo~" which was held in Yoyogi 2nd Gymnasium. On August 23, she also performed in the last day of the Doll☆Elements tour; "ONE-MAN LIVE 2015 SUMMER DOLL PARTY" at Ebisu Liquidroom.

== Appearances ==
=== Television ===
- Kawa10 "Doll☆Ele no Kimi ni Maru Maru Yarasetai!" (July 6, 2015 – December 30, 2016, Kawaiian TV)
- Doll☆Elements no Merumaga 10000nin Dekirukana? (November 17, 2013 – July 31, 2014, Tsukuba TV)

=== Internet TV ===
- Instant Johnson no Shall We Conte? (November 16, 2015 – December 19, 2016, WALLOP TV)
- Doll☆Elements no Himitsu no Oshaberi ~Doll☆Bana~ (July 17, 2015 – January 11, 2017, SHOWROOM)

=== Radio ===
- Doll☆Elements no "Doruraji" (January 6, 2014 – December 27, 2016, Tokyo FM)
- Doll☆Elements no "Kimi no Ashita wo Ouen Shitai!" (April 6, 2014 – November 27, 2015, Bay FM)
