= Gekkouyoku =

"月光浴 (Gekkouyoku)"

Single by Jun Shibata

from the album Tameiki
- Released: June 26, 2002
- Genre: J-Pop
- Length: 0:11:03
- Label: Dreamusic
- Producer: Jun Shibata

Jun Shibata singles chronology
"Sore Demo Kita Michi" (2002)	"月光浴 (Gekkouyoku)" (2002)	"Kataomoi" (2002)

"Gekkouyoku" (Moonlight Bath) is Jun Shibata's 3rd single. It was released on June 26, 2002 and peaked at #34.

== Track listing ==
1. Gekkouyoku (月光浴; Moonlight Bath)
2. Sora no Iro (空の色; Color of the Sky)

== Charts ==
Release	Chart	Peak position	Sales total	Chart run
June 26, 2002	Oricon Daily Singles Chart			
June 26, 2002	Oricon Weekly Singles Chart	34	27,950	8 weeks
June 26, 2002	Oricon Yearly Singles Chart			
