= Guren no Tsuki =

"紅蓮の月 (Guren no Tsuki)"

Single by Jun Shibata

from the album Tsukiyo no Ame
- Released: July 26, 2006
- Genre: J-Pop
- Length: 0:10:16
- Label: Victor Entertainment
- Producer: Jun Shibata

Jun Shibata singles chronology
"Hanafubuki" (2006)	"紅蓮の月 (Guren no Tsuki)" (2006)	"Hiromi" (2007)

"Guren no Tsuki" (Crimson Moon) is Jun Shibata's 13th single. It was released on July 26, 2006 and peaked at #22.

== Track listing ==
1. Guren no tsuki (紅蓮の月; Crimson Moon)
2. Ushirosugata (後ろ姿; Figure from Behind)

== Charts ==
Release	Chart	Peak position	Sales total	Chart run
July 26, 2006	Oricon Daily Singles Chart	16		
July 26, 2006	Oricon Weekly Singles Chart	22	15,732	8 weeks
July 26, 2006	Oricon Yearly Singles Chart			
