= Hanafubuki =

"花吹雪 (Hanafubuki)"

Single by Jun Shibata

from the album Tsukiyo no Ame
- Released: April 19, 2006
- Genre: J-Pop
- Length: 0:11:46
- Label: Victor Entertainment
- Songwriter: Junko Shibata
- Producer: Jun Shibata

Jun Shibata singles chronology
"Maboroshi/Okaerinasai." (2005)	"花吹雪 (Hanafubuki)" (2006)	"Guren no Tsuki" (2006)

"Hanafubuki" (Falling Cherry Blossoms) is Jun Shibata's 12th single and first with Victor Entertainment. It was released on April 19, 2006, and peaked at #8.

== Track listing ==
1. Hanafubuki (花吹雪; Falling Cherry Blossoms)
2. Hitori shibai (ひとり芝居; One-Man Show)

== Charts ==
Release	Chart	Peak position	Sales total	Chart run
April 19, 2006	Oricon Daily Singles Chart	5		
April 19, 2006	Oricon Weekly Singles Chart	8	18,870	6 weeks
April 19, 2006	Oricon Yearly Singles Chart			
