= Tameiki =

"ため息 (Tameiki)"

Single by Jun Shibata

from the album Tameiki
- Released: May 8, 2003
- Genre: J-Pop
- Length: 0:10:50
- Label: Dreamusic
- Producer: Jun Shibata

Jun Shibata singles chronology
"Tonari no Heya" (2003)	"ため息 (Tameiki)" (2003)	"Anata to no Hibi" (2003)

"Tameiki" (Sigh) is Jun Shibata's 6th single and first recut. It was released on May 8, 2003 and peaked at #43.

== Track listing ==
1. Tameiki (ため息; Sigh)
2. Yume (夢; Dream)

== Charts ==
Release	Chart	Peak position	Sales total	Chart run
May 8, 2003	Oricon Daily Singles Chart			
May 8, 2003	Oricon Weekly Singles Chart	43	6,806	4 weeks
May 8, 2003	Oricon Yearly Singles Chart			
