= Anata to no Hibi =

"あなたとの日々 (Anata to no Hibi)"

Single by Jun Shibata

from the album Hitori
- Released: September 10, 2003
- Genre: J-Pop
- Length: 0:11:47
- Label: Dreamusic
- Producer: Jun Shibata

Jun Shibata singles chronology
"Tameiki" (2003)	"あなたとの日々 (Anata to no Hibi)" (2003)	"Miseinen" (2004)

Anata to no Hibi (The Days with You) is Jun Shibata's 7th and best selling single up to date. It is also her first single to break into the Top 10. It was released on September 10, 2003, and peaked at #8.

== Track listing ==
1. Anata to no hibi (あなたとの日々; The Days with You)
2. Kan beer (缶ビール; Can Beer)

== Charts ==
Release	Chart	Peak position	Sales total	Chart run
September 10, 2003	Oricon Daily Singles Chart			
September 10, 2003	Oricon Weekly Singles Chart	8	31,326	8 weeks
September 10, 2003	Oricon Yearly Singles Chart			
