= Samba Faye =

Senegalese-born Japanese basketball player

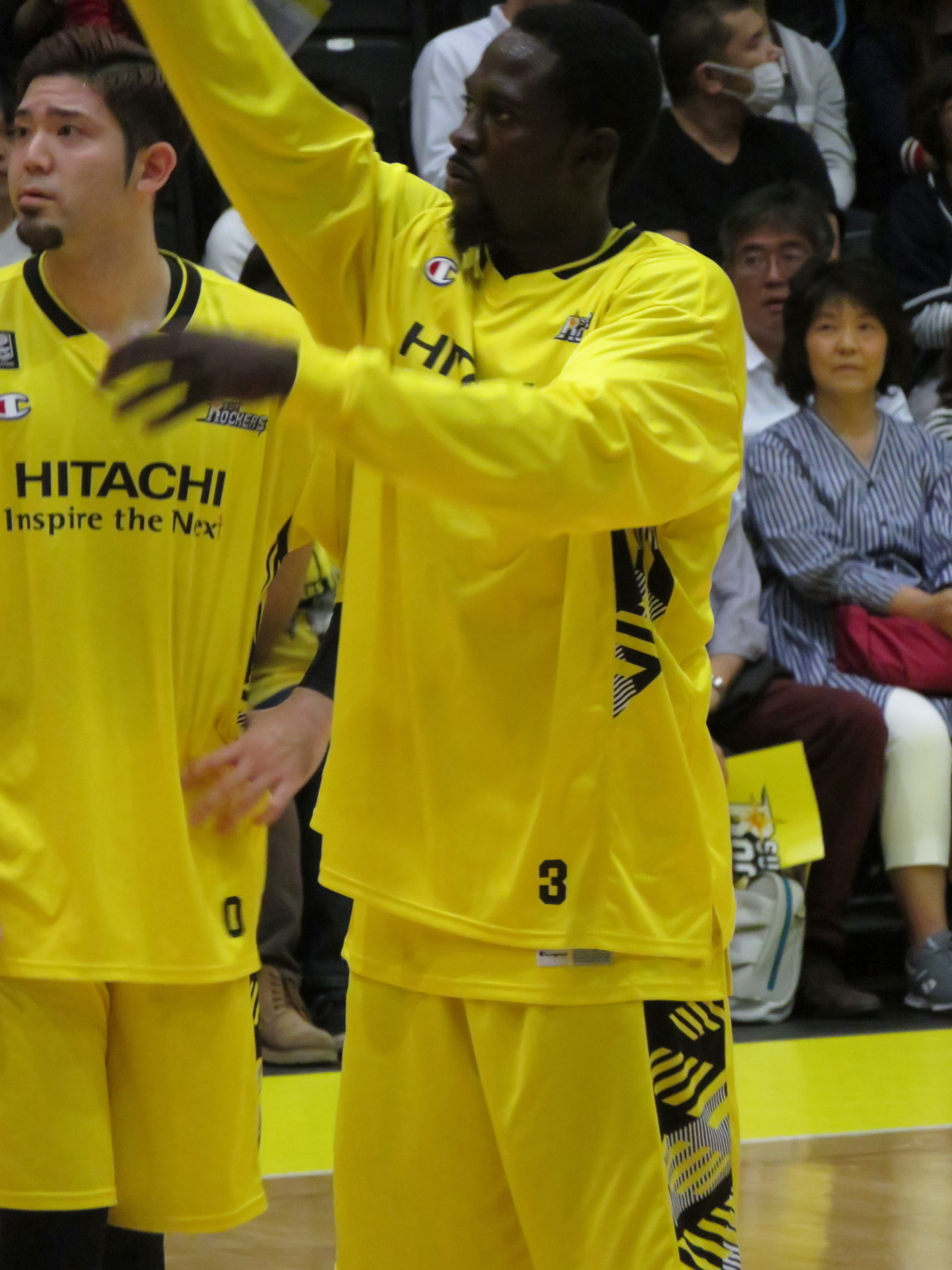

No. 1 – Tryhoop Okayama
- Position: Center
- League: B.League

Personal information
- Born: April 25, 1987 (age 39) Thiès, Senegal
- Listed height: 6 ft 9 in (2.06 m)
- Listed weight: 231 lb (105 kg)

Career information
- High school: Meitoku Gijuku (Susaki, Kōchi)
- College: Tenri University (2007-2011)
- Playing career: 2011–present

Career history
- 2011–2013: Toshiba Brave Thunders Kanagawa
- 2013–2014: Tokio Marine Nichido Big Blue
- 2014: Toshiba Brave Thunders Kanagawa
- 2015–2016: Toyotsu Fighting Eagles Nagoya
- 2016–2018: Shiga Lakestars
- 2018–2020: Sun Rockers Shibuya
- 2020–2022: Kumamoto Volters
- 2022–2023: Toyama Grouses
- 2023–2024: Earthfriends Tokyo Z
- 2024–present: Tryhoop Okayama

Career highlights
- NBDL Scoring leader (2013-14)

Samba Faye (born April 25, 1987), is a Senegalese-born Japanese professional basketball player for the Tryhoop Okayama of the Japanese B.League.

== Career statistics ==
Legend
GP	Games played	GS	Games started	MPG	Minutes per game
FG%	Field goal percentage	3P%	3-point field goal percentage	FT%	Free throw percentage
RPG	Rebounds per game	APG	Assists per game	SPG	Steals per game
BPG	Blocks per game	PPG	Points per game	**Bold**	Career high

*	Led the league

Year	Team	GP	GS	MPG	FG%	3P%	FT%	RPG	APG	SPG	BPG	PPG
2012-13	Toshiba	6		4.8	.500	.000	.333	1.2	0.5	0.2	0	2.3
2013-14	Tokio M	32	31	34.1	.434	.326	.743	12.8	1.6	0.7	0.7	24.5*
2014-15	Toshiba	10	0	9.8	.423	.000	.750	2.2	0.3	0	0.1	2.5
2014-15	Toyotsu	12	10	24.9	.524	.200	.759	12.0	1.4	0.3	0.3	12.8
2015-16	Toyotsu	32	21	19.1	.511	.295	.722	7.6	0.8	0.4	0.6	11.8
2016-17	Shiga	58	33	18.6	.544	.200	.740	5.6	0.4	0.2	0.3	8.2
2017-18	Shiga	54	49	21.4	.543	.333	.719	4.4	1.3	0.5	0.3	9.1
