= Maboroshi/Okaerinasai. =

"幻/おかえりなさい。 (Maboroshi/Okaerinasai.)"

Single by Jun Shibata

from the album Watashi
- Released: May 8, 2005
- Genre: J-Pop
- Length: 0:11:42
- Label: Dreamusic
- Producer: Jun Shibata

Jun Shibata singles chronology
"Shiroi Sekai" (2005)	"幻/おかえりなさい。 (Maboroshi/Okaerinasai.)" (2005)	"Hanafubuki" (2006)

"Maboroshi"/"Okaerinasai." (Illusion/Welcome Home.) is Jun Shibata's 11th single and second recut. It is also her first double A-side single as well as her last with Dreamusic. It was released on May 8, 2005 and peaked at #30.

== Track listing ==
1. Maboroshi (幻; Illusion)
2. Okaerinasai. (おかえりなさい。; Welcome Home.)

== Charts ==
Release	Chart	Peak position	Sales total
May 8, 2005	Oricon Weekly Singles Chart	30	15,122
