= Seiichi Kuwamoto =

Japanese basketball coach

Seiichi Kuwamoto 鍬本 晴一
Tokio Marine Nichido Big Blue
- Position: Head coach
- League: B.League

Personal information
- Born: Tokyo

Career information
- High school: Waseda (Nerima, Tokyo)
- College: Waseda University

Career history

Coaching
- xxxx-present: Tokio Marine Nichido Big Blue

Seiichi Kuwamoto (鍬本 晴一, Kuwamoto Seiichi) is the Head coach of the Tokio Marine Nichido Big Blue in the Japanese B.League.

== Head coaching record ==
Legend
Regular season	G	Games coached	W	Games won	L	Games lost	W–L %	Win–loss %
Playoffs	PG	Playoff games	PW	Playoff wins	PL	Playoff losses	PW–L %	Playoff win–loss %

Team	Year	G	W	L	W–L%	Finish	PG	PW	PL	PW–L%	Result
Tokio Marine Nichido Big Blue	2017-18	32	5	27	.156	9th in B3	-	-	-	–	-
