= Keisuke Takabatake =

Japanese basketball player (born 1990)

Keisuke Takabatake 高畠佳介
No. 31 – Tryhoop Okayama
- Position: Guard
- League: B.League

Personal information
- Born: March 17, 1990 (age 36) Kusatsu, Shiga, Japan
- Listed height: 6 ft 0 in (1.83 m)
- Listed weight: 183 lb (83 kg)

Career information
- High school: Kusatsu (Kusatsu, Shiga)
- College: Biwako Seikei Sport College
- Playing career: 2013–present

Career history
- 2013–2016: Rizing Fukuoka
- 2016–2017: Shimane Susanoo Magic
- 2017–2018: Akita Northern Happinets
- 2018-2021: Ehime Orange Vikings
- 2021-2023: Iwate Big Bulls
- 2023-present: Tryhoop Okayama

Keisuke Takabatake (born March 17, 1990) is a Japanese professional basketball player who plays for Tryhoop Okayama of the B.League in Japan.

== Career statistics ==
Legend
GP	Games played	GS	Games started	MPG	Minutes per game
FG%	Field goal percentage	3P%	3-point field goal percentage	FT%	Free throw percentage
RPG	Rebounds per game	APG	Assists per game	SPG	Steals per game
BPG	Blocks per game	PPG	Points per game	**Bold**	Career high

=== Regular season ===
Year	Team	GP	GS	MPG	FG%	3P%	FT%	RPG	APG	SPG	BPG	PPG
2012-13	Fukuoka	16	0	3.1	33.3	26.1	**100**	0.2	0.1	0.2	0	1.9
2013-14	Fukuoka	43	2	10.0	33.1	34.0	78.3	0.4	0.5	0.4	0	3.5
2014-15	Fukuoka	49	12	16.0	37.4	32.7	73.3	1.1	0.9	0.5	0	4.6
2015-16	Fukuoka	51	15	16.5	**39.6**	**37.9**	78.3	1.2	0.9	0.7	**0.1**	**7.4**
2016-17	Shimane	**60**	**33**	**22.0**	34.0	33.9	80.6	**1.7**	**1.2**	**0.8**	**0.1**	**7.4**
2017-18	Akita	39	7	12.8	31.4	27.4	86.7	1	0.9	**0.8**	**0.1**	3.8
2018-19	Ehime	57	14	20.51	34.1	33.2	77.4	2.1	2.1	0.73	0.07	8.6
2019-20	Ehime	41	7	20.7	34.3	32.4	84.2	2.1	1.4	0.6	0.0	7.2

=== Playoffs ===
Year	Team	GP	GS	MPG	FG%	3P%	FT%	RPG	APG	SPG	BPG	PPG
2016-17	Shimane	4	3	16.47	.350	.250	1.000	1.8	0.8	0.25	0	5.0
2017-18	Akita	4	0	12.49	.563	.500	.000	0.8	0.8	0.25	0	5.8

=== Early cup games ===
Year	Team	GP	GS	MPG	FG%	3P%	FT%	RPG	APG	SPG	BPG	PPG
2017	Akita	2	1	15:48	.333	.333	.500	2.5	1.0	2.5	0	4.0
2018	Ehime	3	1	18:49	.308	.286	.750	1.3	3.3	0	0	7.7
2019	Ehime	2	1	26:22	.417	.235	.889	5.0	2.0	0	0	16.0

== Trivia ==
- He is a sort of comedian with his Kansai accent and makes people laugh easily.
