= Single Collection (Jun Shibata album) =

Compilation album by Jun Shibata
- Released: September 21, 2005
- Genre: J-pop
- Length: 0:58:44
- Label: Dreamusic
- Producer: Jun Shibata

Jun Shibata chronology
Watashi (2005)	Single Collection (2005)	Tsukiyo no Ame (2007)

Single Collection is Jun Shibata's first compilation album. It was released on September 21, 2005, and peaked at No. 23 in Japan.

== Track listing ==
1. Boku no mikata (ぼくの味方; My Friend)
2. Sore demo kita michi (それでも来た道; It Nevertheless Is the Road I Came From)
3. Gekkouyoku (月光浴; Moonlight Bath)
4. Kataomoi (片想い; One-Sided Love)
5. Tonari no heya (隣りの部屋; The Room Next Door)
6. Tameiki (ため息; Sigh)
7. Anata to no hibi (あなたとの日々; The Days With You)
8. Miseinen (未成年; Underage)
9. Chiisana boku e (ちいさなぼくへ; To the Small Me)
10. Shiroi Sekai (白い世界; White World)
11. Maboroshi (幻; Illusion)

== Charts ==
Release	Chart	Peak position	Sales total
September 21, 2005	Oricon Weekly Albums Chart	23	22,065
