= Alex Murphy (basketball) =

Finnish-American basketball player

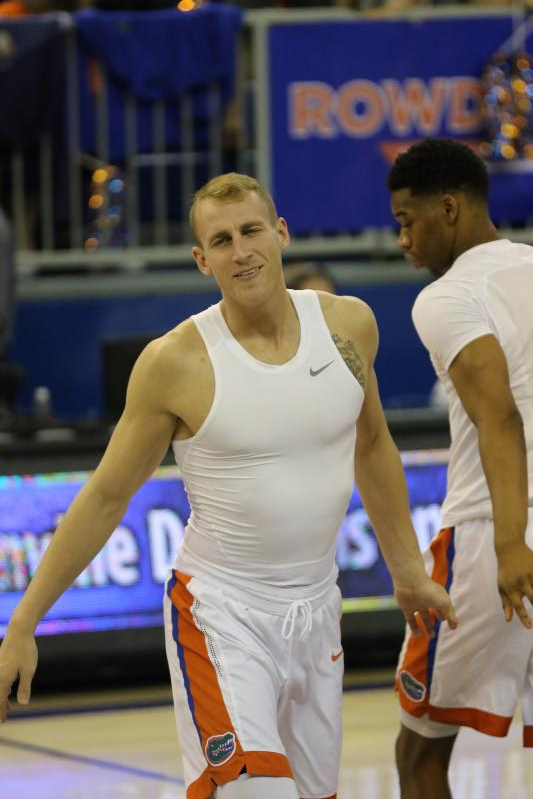
- Murphy playing for Florida

No. 5 – Baloncesto Fuenlabrada
- Position: Small forward
- League: Primera FEB

Personal information
- Born: June 3, 1993 (age 33) Wakefield, Rhode Island, U.S.
- Listed height: 6 ft 9 in (2.06 m)
- Listed weight: 220 lb (100 kg)

Career information
- High school: St. Mark's School (Southborough, Massachusetts)
- College: Duke (2011–2013); Florida (2014–2016); Northeastern (2016–2017)
- NBA draft: 2017: undrafted
- Playing career: 2017–present

Career history
- 2017–2018: Kataja
- 2018–2019: Szolnoki Olaj KK
- 2019–2020: Gipuzkoa
- 2020–2021: Granada
- 2021–2022: Fukushima Firebonds
- 2022–2023: Levanga Hokkaido
- 2023–2024: CB Estudiantes
- 2024–2025: Tryhoop Okayama
- 2025: Alvark Tokyo
- 2025: Shimane Susanoo Magic
- 2025–present: Fuenlabrada

Career highlights
- 2x Copa Princesa de Asturias (2020, 2024); LEB Oro Forward of the Year (2020); LEB Oro Bosman Player of the Year (2020)

Alex James Murphy (born June 3, 1993) is a Finnish-American professional basketball player who plays for Fuenlabrada in the Primera FEB. He played college basketball for Duke University, the University of Florida and Northeastern University. He is the son of former National Basketball Association (NBA) player Jay Murphy, and the brother of former NBA forward Erik Murphy. He plays for the Finnish national team.

== High school career ==
Murphy was ranked as the No. 41 player in the ESPNU 100, the No. 45 player by Rivals.com, and the No. 41 player by Scout.com. He attended St. Mark's School in Southborough, Massachusetts, where he played alongside Kaleb Tarczewski and Nik Stauskas. Murphy led St. Mark's School to a 27–3 record as a junior. Murphy was also named NEPSAC ISL Player of the Year in 2011. In April 2011, he decided to forgo his senior year of high school and join the class of 2011. This allowed Murphy to graduate in the spring of 2011 and attend Duke University in the fall of that year. Murphy left St. Mark's School and attended South Kingstown High School for the remaining months in order to graduate and enroll at Duke that summer.

== AAU ==
Murphy played for the Adidas sponsored New England Playaz Basketball Club.

== College recruitment ==
College recruiting
Name	Hometown	School	Height	Weight	Commit date
Alex Murphy; SF	Wakefield, Rhode Island	St. Mark's School	6 ft 8 in (2.03 m)	215 lb (98 kg)	Feb 7, 2011
Alex Murphy; SF	Recruit ratings: Scout: Rivals: (96)				

Murphy committed to play basketball at Duke on February 7, 2011. Recruiting columnists speculated that he would commit to the University of Florida because his older brother, Erik Murphy, was a four-year player under coach Billy Donovan. Murphy chose Duke over Florida, Arizona, Boston College, North Carolina, Villanova and West Virginia.

== Reclassification ==
On April 19, 2011, Murphy announced that he would reclassify and be graduating a year early from St. Mark's School and would enroll at Duke University a year earlier than expected. Having met all academic requirements necessary to do this, Murphy was able to enroll at Duke in the summer of 2011, and was the fifth member of Duke's 2011 recruiting class. "It was a very difficult decision but at the end of the day, I thought this was the best thing for my future," Murphy said. "It's a great opportunity."

== College career ==
=== Redshirt (2011-2012) ===
In December 2011, Murphy decided to redshirt his freshman season with fellow recruit Marshall Plumlee. Murphy said, "It's still to be determined, but a redshirt year is most likely what I'm going to do. That's the plan right now." after No. 5 Duke beat Washington, 86–80, at Madison Square Garden.

== Professional career ==
On August 4, 2017, Murphy signed his first professional contract with Joensuun Kataja of the Finnish Korisliiga.

On July 13, 2018, Murphy signed a one-year deal with Szolnoki Olaj KK of the Hungarian League.

On August 5, 2019, he signed with Delteco Gipuzkoa Basket.

On August 9, 2020, Murphy signed with Granada.

On June 28, 2021, Murphy signed with Fukushima Firebonds of the B.League.

On July 28, 2022, Murphy signed with Levanga Hokkaido of the B.League.

On August 12, 2023, Murphy signed with CB Estudiantes.

On June 25, 2024, Murphy signed with Tryhoop Okayama of the B.League. On January 6, 2025, his contract was terminated. On January 31, he signed with Alvark Tokyo of the B.League. On February 27, his contract was expired. On March 4, he signed with Shimane Susanoo Magic of the B.League. On April 17, his contract was terminated.

== Personal life ==
Murphy's father, Jay Murphy, is a former NBA player. His mother, Päivi, from whom he gained a Finnish citizenship by birth, played for the Finland women's national basketball team from 1988 to 1994. His older brother Erik Murphy is also a professional basketball player. The Murphys are Catholic and members of Saint Francis of Assisi Parish in Wakefield, Rhode Island.

He holds both Finnish and American passports.

== International ==
Murphy played for Finland at the FIBA U20 European Championships in the summer of 2012. Murphy is now a member of the Finland men's national basketball team and represented Finland at the 2023 FIBA Basketball World Cup.

== Career statistics ==
=== National team ===
Team	Tournament	Pos.	GP	PPG	RPG	APG
Finland	2023 FIBA World Cup	21st	3	1.3	1.3	0.3
