= Tokio Marine Nichido Big Blue =

- Leagues: Japan Industrial and Commercial Basketball Federation
- Founded: 1932
- Arena: Tokio Marine Nichido Shakujii Gymnasium
- Capacity: 200
- Location: Nerima, Tokyo
- Website: Official website
Uniform	Uniform

The Tokio Marine Nichido Big Blue is a semi-professional basketball team that competes in the Japan Industrial and Commercial Basketball Federation. After the end of the 2018-19 season, the team resigned to its place in the B3 League.

== Coaches ==
- Seiichi Kuwamoto
- Yoichi Motoyasu (assistant)

== Roster ==
Tokio Marine Nichido Big Blue roster
Players	Coaches
Pos. / No. / Nat. / Name; / / / [[ |]]	Head coach: Vacant; Assistant coach(es) Tomoo Sano Legend: (C) Team captain; Injured; Roster

== Notable players ==
- Samba Faye
- Andre Murray [tl]
- Ken Takeda
