= Tokio Marine Nichido Shakujii Gymnasium =

Arena in Nerima, Tokyo, Japan

Coordinates: 35°44′24.6″N 139°35′44.6″E

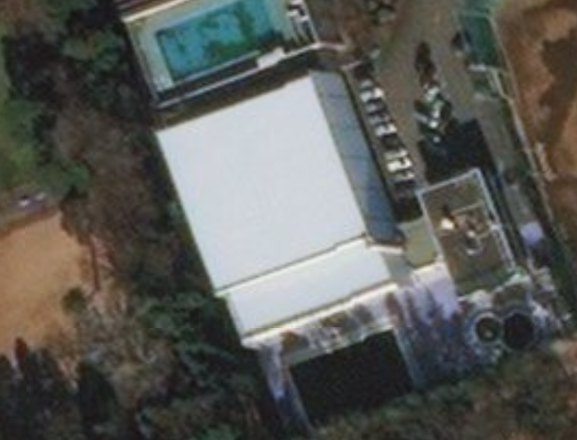
- Interactive map of Tokio Marine Nichido Shakujii Gymnasium
- Full name: Tokio Marine Nichido Shakujii Gymnasium
- Location: Nerima, Tokyo, Japan
- Owner: Tokio Marine Nichido
- Operator: Tokio Marine Nichido

Construction
- Cost

Tenant
- Tokio Marine Nichido Big Blue

Tokio Marine Nichido Shakujii Gymnasium is an arena in Nerima, Tokyo, Japan. It is the home arena of the Tokio Marine Nichido Big Blue of the B.League, Japan's professional basketball league.
