= Funky Kato =

Funky Kato ファンキー加藤
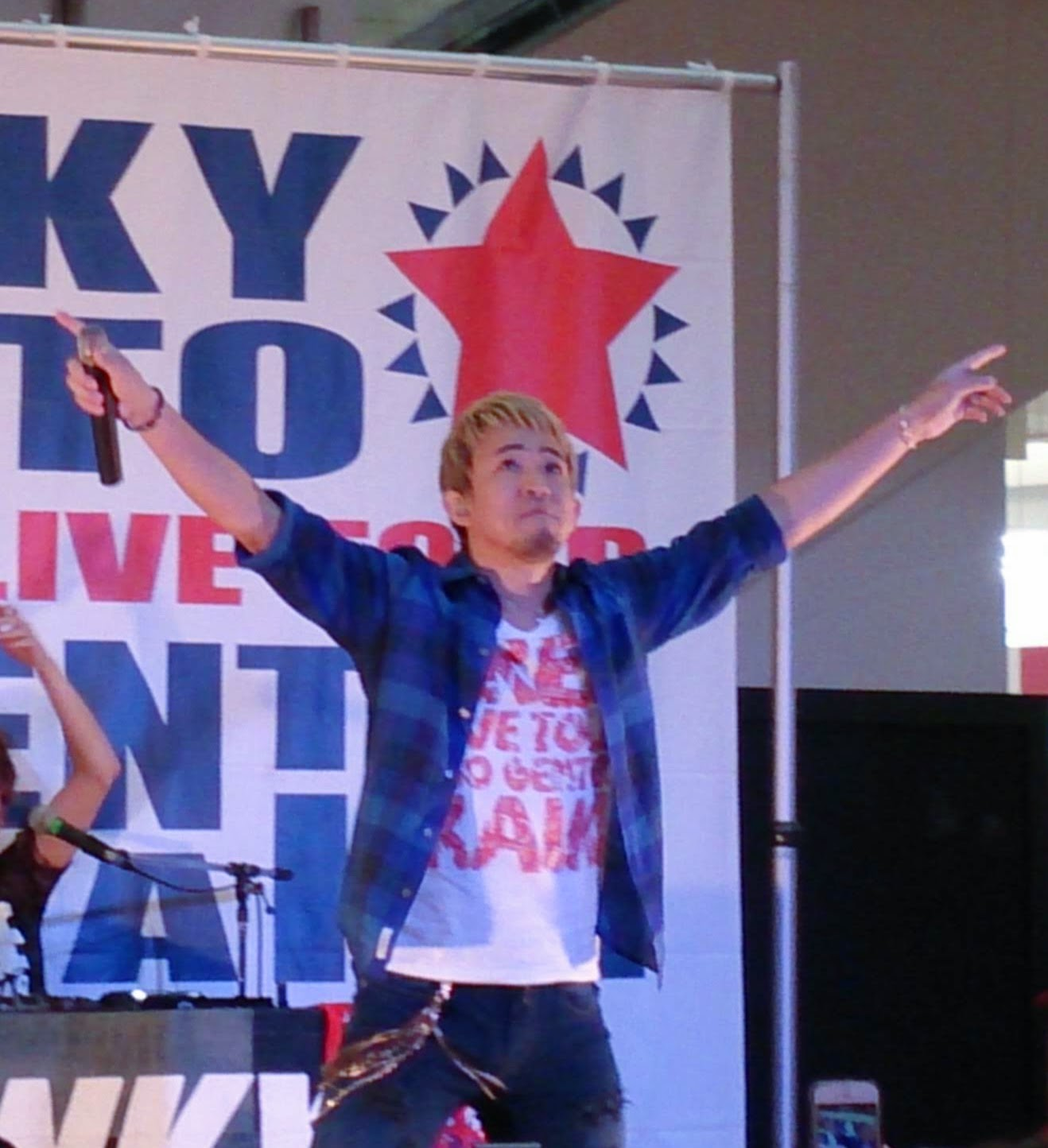

Background information
- Born: Shunsuke Kato; December 18, 1978 (age 47); Hachiōji, Tokyo, Japan
- Genre: J-Pop
- Occupation: Singer
- Instruments: Vocals, guitar
- Years active: 2004–present
- Website: funkykato.com

Shunsuke Kato (加藤 俊介, Katō Shunsuke; born December 18, 1978), known by his stage name Funky Kato (ファンキー加藤, Fankī Katō), is a Japanese singer-songwriter. He is best known as the vocalist of the band Funky Monkey Babys, which disbanded in 2013.

== History ==
Funky Kato was working as a member of FUNKY MONKEY BABYS from the band's beginnings in 2004. They would go on to sign a major label contract in 2006. After their disbandment in June 2013, he started his solo career by going on a tour entitled Funky Kato's Insutoaraibu Tour from November to February of the next year.

He has since released three singles, one album and has been able to play at the Nippon Budokan.

He married his band's former manager on April 15, 2013.

== Discography ==
=== Singles ===
List of singles, with selected peak chart positions
| Title | Release date | Peak chart positions | |
| Title | Release date | Oricon | Japan Hot 100 |
|---|---|---|---|
| "My Voice" | February 12, 2014 | 3 | 3 |
| "Kagayake" (輝け) | May 14, 2014 | 5 | 4 |
| "Taiyō" (太陽) | August 20, 2014 | 14 | 12 |
