= Jun Shibata =

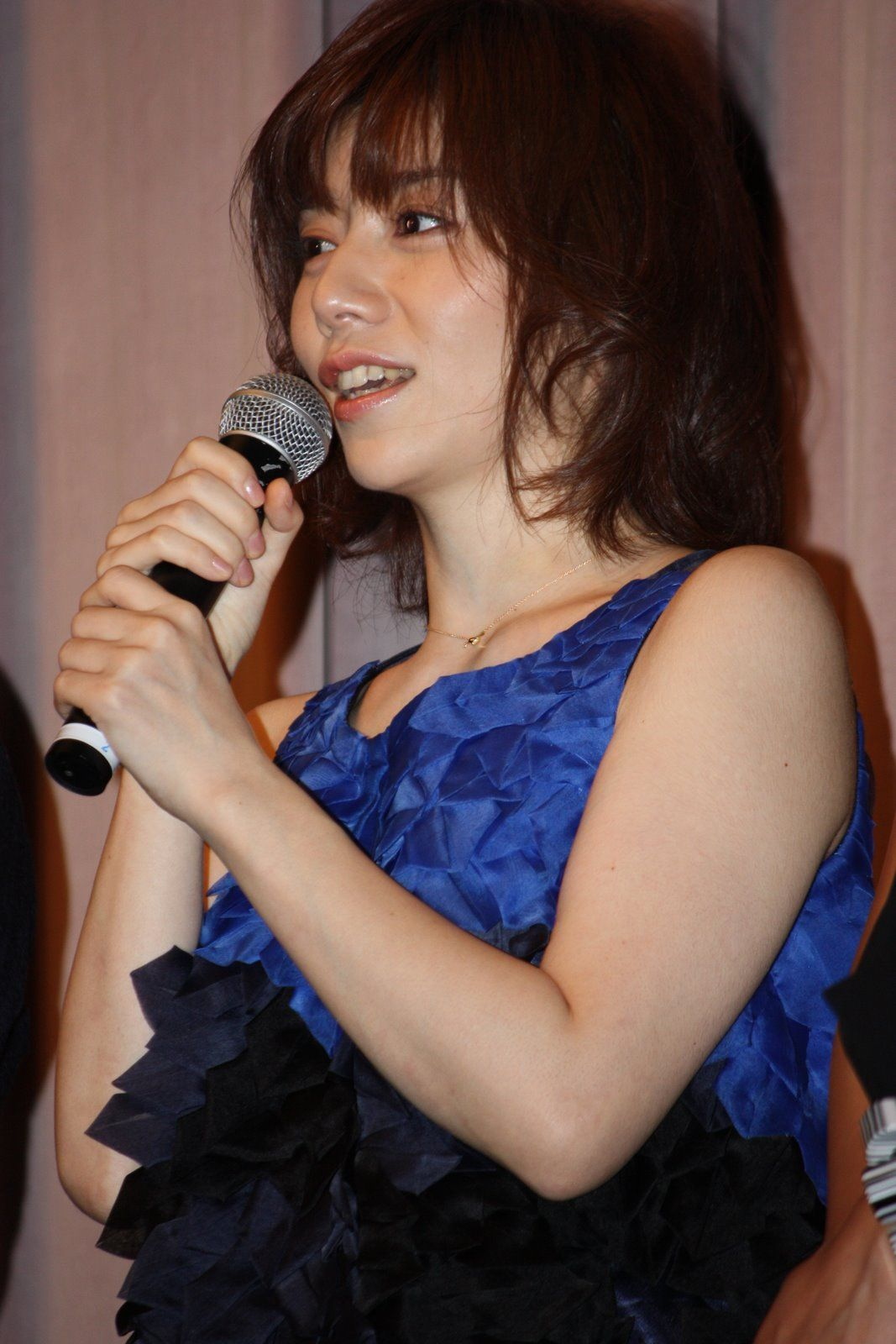

Background information
- Also known as: Shibajun
- Born: Jun Shibata (柴田淳); November 19, 1976 (age 50); Setagaya, Tokyo, Japan
- Genre: J-pop
- Occupations: Singer, songwriter
- Instruments: Vocals, piano
- Years active: 1998–present
- Labels: Dreamusic Incorporated (2001–2005); Victor Entertainment (2006 -)

Jun Shibata (柴田 淳, Shibata Jun; born November 19, 1976), nicknamed "Shibajun", is a Japanese pop female singer-songwriter. She was born in Setagaya, Tokyo. In 2016, she was diagnosed with partial hearing loss.

== Musical characteristics ==
Many of her songs are of slow and medium tempo and/or ballads expressive of fragility. Occasionally her soft vocals are accompanied by herself on the piano.

In the early stages of her singing career, she was known to have travelled extensively nationwide to perform live at local record stores in front of small crowds.

She has provided lyrics to the well-known Japanese singing-duo Chemistry for their song "Tsukiyo".

== Discography ==
Numbers in bold represent peak Oricon Weekly Ranking position.

=== Singles ===
- Boku no Mikata (ぼくの味方) June 27, 2001 (Indies Release) Uncharted
- Boku no Mikata (ぼくの味方) October 31, 2001, Uncharted
- Sore Demo Kita Michi (それでも来た道) February 20, 2002, No. 90
- Gekkouyoku (月光浴) June 26, 2002, No. 34
- Kataomoi (片想い) October 23, 2002, No. 20
- Tonari no Heya (隣の部屋) January 29, 2003, No. 17
- Tameiki (ため息) May 8, 2003, No. 43
- Anata to no Hibi (あなたとの日々) September 10, 2003, No. 8
- Miseinen (未成年) January 28, 2004, No. 20
- Chiisana Boku e (ちいさなぼくへ) November 25, 2004, No. 22
- Shiroi Sekai (白い世界) February 23, 2005, No. 31
- Maboroshi/Okaerinasai. (幻/おかえりなさい。) May 18, 2005, No. 30
- Hanafubuki (花吹雪) April 19, 2006, No. 8
- Guren no Tsuki (紅蓮の月) July 26, 2006, No. 22
- Hiromi January 11, 2007, No. 5
- Colorful (カラフル) September 12, 2007, No. 15
- Futari (ふたり) May 28, 2008, No. 15
- Ai wo Suru Hito – Orochi's Theme (愛をする人 – Orochi's Theme) September 17, 2008, No. 13
- Love Letter October 7, 2009, No. 14 6,061 copies sold

=== Studio albums ===
- Oort no Kumo (オールトの雲) March 20, 2002, No. 59
- Tameiki (ため息) February 26, 2003, No. 12
- Hitori (ひとり) February 25, 2004, No. 15
- Watashi (わたし) March 30, 2005, No. 6
- Tsukiyo no Ame (月夜の雨) February 21, 2007, No. 9
- Shin'ai Naru Kimi e (親愛なる君へ) June 18, 2008, No. 9
- Ghost Writer (ゴーストライター) November 4, 2009, No. 9 17,380 copies sold
- Boku Tachi no Mirai (僕たちの未来) August 3, 2011
- Anata to Mita Yume Kimi no Inai Asa (あなたと見た夢 君のいない朝) March 27, 2013
- Babyrousa no Kiba (バビルサの牙; Babyrousa's Tusk) December 17, 2014
- Watashi wa Shiawase (私は幸せ; I'm Happy) September 20, 2017
- Brinicle (ブライニクル) October 31, 2018
- 901 Go Shitsu no Obake (901号室のおばけ) November 20, 2024

=== Compilations ===
- Single Collection September 21, 2005, No. 23
- Shibaura (しば裏) March 14, 2007, No. 36
- All Time Request BEST ～しばづくし～ November 25, 2015

=== DVDs ===
- Jun Shibata Music Film Collection (しば漬け) March 26, 2003
- Live at Gloria Chapel June 23, 2004
- Jun Shibata Music Film Collection (しば漬け2) September 21, 2005
- Jun Shibata Tour 2007: Shibajun, Hajimemashita (~柴田淳 Tour 2007～しばじゅん、はじめました～) September 26, 2007
- Jun Shibata Concert Tour 2008 Tsukiyo Party Vol.1: Shibajun, Icecream kara Sunny e~ (月夜Party Vol.１ ～しばじゅん、アイスクリームからサニーへ～) March 4, 2009

=== Digital releases ===
- Guren no Tsuki Live Version (紅蓮の月 Live Version) September 27, 2006
