= Kataomoi (Jun Shibata song) =

"片想い (Kataomoi)"

Single by Jun Shibata

from the album Tameiki
- Released: October 23, 2002
- Genre: J-Pop
- Length: 0:11:47
- Label: Dreamusic
- Producer: Jun Shibata

Jun Shibata singles chronology
"Gekkouyoku" (2002)	"片想い (Kataomoi)" (2002)	"Tonari no Heya" (2003)

"Kataomoi" (One-Sided Love) is Jun Shibata's 4th single and first to break into the Top 20. It was released on October 23, 2002 and peaked at #20.

== Track listing ==
1. Kataomoi (片想い; One-Sided Love)
2. Utsukushii hito (美しい人; Beautiful Person)

== Charts ==
Release	Chart	Peak position	Sales total	Chart run
October 23, 2002	Oricon Daily Singles Chart			
October 23, 2002	Oricon Weekly Singles Chart	20	23,834	11 weeks
October 23, 2002	Oricon Yearly Singles Chart			
