= Dreamusic =

Japanese record label and talent agency

Dreamusic Incorporated
- Company type: Subsidiary
- Industry: Music
- Founded: 2001; 25 years ago
- Founder: Tomoyuki Takechi
- Headquarters: Shibuya, Tokyo, Japan
- Key people: Tom Yoda (chairman); Tomoyuki Takechi (president); Mitsuo Takako (representative to the RIAJ)
- Revenue: 310.21 million Japanese yen
- Owner: See list
- Number of employees: 33 (as of 2009)
- Parent: T.Y. Limited, Inc.
- Subsidiaries: FOGHORN Management
- Website: http://www.dreamusic.co.jp/index.html

Dreamusic Incorporated (株式会社ドリーミュージック, Kabushiki gaisha Dorii Miyuujikku) is a Japanese record label also working as a subsidiary of TY Limited Incorporated.

Its chairman is Tom Yoda, ex-chairman of Avex Group.

== Labels ==
- Dreamusic Overseas
- Teenage Symphony Label
- Feel Mee (from assets acquired from Interchannel in 2013)

== Artists ==
=== Domestic ===
- Funky Monkey Babys
- Doll Elements
- Yōichi Aoyama
- Yūzō Kayama
- Hiroko Nakamura
- Ayaka Hirahara
- Ryoko Moriyama
- Hiroshi Ikematsu
- Kana Oshita
- Color Bottle
- Kawae Minoko
- Shinji Kuno
- Yukie Sone
- Norimasa Fujisawa
- Platinum
- Minji
- Meilin
- Gyunta
- Teenage Symphony (Dreamusic/Teenage Symphony)
- Jam 9
- T4
- Lisa Ono

=== International ===
- Choi Ye-na
- Elliot Minor
- Dúné
- Erik Mongrain
- Smile.dk
- Sunshine State
- Caitlyn
- Nicole
- Mon Roe
- Kids on Bridges
- BABY BLUE (MNL48 sub-unit)

=== Former ===
- Jun Shibata (Active, with Victor Entertainment)
- YamaArashi (Active, with Knife Edge)
- Amin (Active, with Victor Entertainment)
- MisaChi (Active, unsigned)
- Miku Nakamura (Active, unsigned)
- Machine
- Rockwell (Active, with U's Music)
- Masanori Sera (Retired, since 2008)
- Silent Siren (Active, with EMI Records Japan)

== Distribution ==
Sony Music Entertainment Japan Incorporated is the current distributor of Dreamusic and is one of its shareholders.

Dreamusic was formerly distributed by Columbia Music Entertainment from 2003 to 2007 and by King Records from 2007 to 2010.

== Shareholders ==
- TY Limited
- Taito
- Takara Tomy
- Sony Music Entertainment Japan
- Gaku Records
- Japan-Asia Holdings
- Dai-ichi Hoki
- Nihon Unicom
- Rentrak
- Atoss International

== See also ==
- List of record labels
- Tom Yoda
