= Shibaura (album) =

しば裏 (Shibaura)

Compilation album by Jun Shibata
- Released: March 14, 2007
- Genre: J-pop
- Length: 1:18:22
- Label: Dreamusic
- Producer: Jun Shibata

Jun Shibata chronology
Tsukiyo no Ame (2007)	しば裏 (Shibaura) (2007)	Shin'ai Naru Kimi e (2008)

Shibaura is Jun Shibata's second compilation album. It was released on March 14, 2007, and peaked at No. 36 in Japan.

== Track listing ==
1. Sora no iro (空の色; Color of the Sky)
2. Yume (夢; Dream)
3. Wasuremono (忘れもの; Lost Objects)
4. Okaerinasai. (おかえりなさい。; Welcome Home.)
5. Kanbeer (缶ビール; Can Beer)
6. Shuuden (終電; Last Train)
7. Henshin (変身; Metamorphosis)
8. Utsukushii hito (美しい人; Beautiful Person)
9. Hikari (光; Light)
10. Shiawase na uta (幸せなうた; Happy Song)
11. Kaerimichi (帰り道; The Way Home)
12. Ichibanboshi (いちばん星; The First Star)
13. Boku no mikata (Indies Version) (ぼくの味方 （インディーズバージョン）; My Friend (Indies Version))
14. Pink no kumo (ピンクの雲; Pink Clouds)

== Charts ==
Release	Chart	Peak position	Sales total
March 14, 2007	Oricon Weekly Albums Chart	36	9,727
