= Yoichi Motoyasu =

Japanese basketball coach

Personal information
- Born: June 9, 1981 (age 45) Shunan, Yamaguchi

Career information
- High school: Tokuyama (Tokuyama, Yamaguchi)
- College: Waseda University (2001-2010)
- Position: Head coach
- Coaching career: 2009–present

Career history

Coaching
- 2009–2012: Tokio Marine Nichido Big Blue (asst.)
- 2012–2014: Tokyo Cinq Rêves (asst.)
- 2014–2015: Akita Northern Happinets (asst.)
- 2015–2016: Osaka Evessa (asst.)
- 2018-2019: Tryhoop Okayama

Yoichi Motoyasu (元安陽一, Motoyasu Yōichi; born June 9, 1981) is a former professional basketball assistant coach for Tokio, Akita, and Osaka in Japan.
