= Oort no Kumo =

オールトの雲 (Oort no Kumo)

Studio album by Jun Shibata
- Released: 20 March 2002
- Genre: J-pop
- Length: 0:50:16
- Label: Dreamusic
- Producer: Jun Shibata

Jun Shibata chronology
オールトの雲 (Oort no Kumo) (2002)	Tameiki (2003)

Oort no Kumo (Oort Cloud) is Jun Shibata's 1st studio album. It was released on 20 March 2002 and peaked at #59 in the Oricon Weekly Albums Chart.

== Track listing ==
1. Nanka ii koto nai kana (なんかいいことないかな; Isn't There Something Good)
2. Boku no mikata (ぼくの味方; My Friend)
3. Henshin (変身; Metamorphosis)
4. Isshoni kaerou (一緒に帰ろう; Let's Go Home Together)
5. Yoru no umi ni tachi... (夜の海に立ち...; On the Beach at Night...)
6. Kaerimichi (帰り道; The Way Home)
7. Hon no chotto (ほんのちょっと; Just a Little)
8. Hoshi no yoin (星の余韻 The Lingering of the Stars)
9. Sukitooru tsuki~Hikikatari~ (透き通る月～弾き語り～; Transparent Moon: Hikigatari) ^{1}
10. Sore demo kita michi (それでも来た道; It Nevertheless Is the Road I Came From)

^{1}Hikigatari means to sing to one's own accompaniment.

== Charts ==
Release	Chart	Peak position	Sales total
20 March 200	Oricon Weekly Singles Chart	59	12,016
