= DeVaughn Washington =

American basketball player

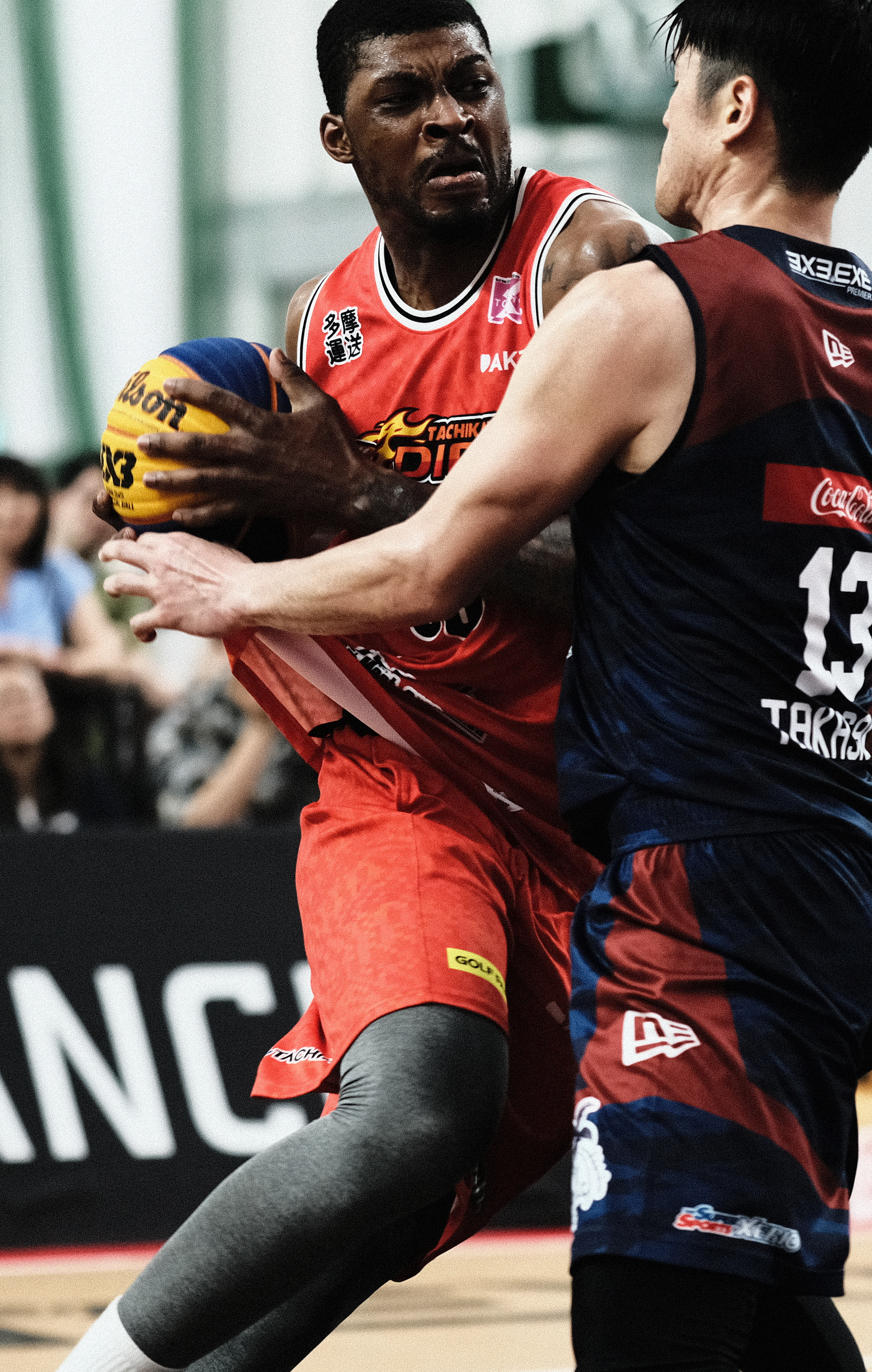
- Washington in 2019

Personal information
- Born: March 29, 1989 (age 37) Virginia Beach, Virginia, U.S.
- Listed height: 6 ft 8 in (2.03 m)
- Listed weight: 212 lb (96 kg)

Career information
- High school: Kempsville (Virginia Beach, Virginia)
- College: Ohio (2007–2011)
- NBA draft: 2011: undrafted
- Playing career: 2011–present
- Position: Power forward

Career history
- 2011–2012: Gelişim Koleji
- 2012: Bohemios Montevideo
- 2012–2013: WBC Wels
- 2013–2014: Kumamoto Volters
- 2014: Nishinomiya Storks
- 2014–2015: Shinshu Brave Warriors
- 2015–2016: Kumamoto Volters
- 2016–2017: Kauhajoki Karhu
- 2017–2018: Balkan Botevgrad
- 2018–2019: Kymis
- 2019–2020: Falco Szombathely
- 2020–2021: Rabotnički
- 2021: Larisa
- 2021–2022: Balkan
- 2022–2023: Tryhoop Okayama
- 2023: Sendai 89ers
- 2023–2024: Niigata Albirex BB
- 2024: Nagasaki Velca
- 2024: Tachikawa Dice
- 2024–2025: Prawira Bandung
- 2025: Ikaroi Trikalon
- 2025–2026: Kožuv
- 2026: Ángeles de la Ciudad de México

Career highlights
- Bulgarian League All-Star (2018)

DeVaughn Lamar Washington (born March 29, 1989) is an American professional basketball player for Ángeles de la Ciudad de México of the CIBACOPA. Washington is known for being a consistent scorer in Europe. Standing at 2.03 m (6 ft 8 in), he plays the power forward position. After playing four years of college basketball at Ohio Washington entered the 2011 NBA draft, but he was not selected in the draft's two rounds.

== High school career ==
Washington played high school basketball at Kempsville high school, in Virginia Beach, Virginia. He was ranked as the 778 best player of the nation and the 141 best Small forward of the state.

== College career ==
In his senior year, Washington was the second best scorer and the second best rebounder of the team, averaging 13.3 points and 5.6 rebounds per game. He led the Bobcats to a third postseason appearance in four years. Washington finished with 1,061 points for his career in Athens after improving every season.

== Professional career ==
After going undrafted in the 2011 NBA draft, Washington joined Saint-Étienne in France. He left the team before appearing in a single game with them and joined Gelişim Koleji of the Turkish Basketball Second League. On February 14, 2012, he joined Bohemios of the Uruguayan League. On July 20, 2012, he returned to Europe and joined WBC Wels of the Austrian Basketball League.

The following season, Washington moved to Kumamoto Volters of the B.League. On November 21, he joined Shinshu Brave Warriors.

On September 23, 2017, Washington joined Kauhajoki Karhu of the Korisliiga. The following year, he joined Balkan Botevgrad. During the season, he led Balkan to the NBL finals, where Balkan lost from Levski Sofia.

On June 16, 2018, Washington joined Kymi of the Greek Basket League. On October 14, 2018, Washington posted 24 points and grabbed 6 rebounds in a 77–74 team loss against Olympiacos.

Washington finished the 2020–2021 season back in Greece, playing for Larisa. In 9 games, he averaged 11.7 points and 4.9 rebounds, playing 23 minutes per contest. On August 5, 2021, Washington renewed his contract with the Greek club. On November 27 of the same year, however, he parted ways with Larisa, after averaging only 4.4 points and 4.8 rebounds, playing 19 minutes per contest. On December 1, he signed with BC Balkan Botevgrad of the Bulgarian National Basketball League.

On August 18, 2022, Washington signed with the Tryhoop Okayama of the B.League.

In December 2024, Washington signed with the Prawira Bandung of the Indonesian Basketball League (IBL).
