= Kenji Hilke =

Japanese basketball player

Kenji Hilke 比留木謙司
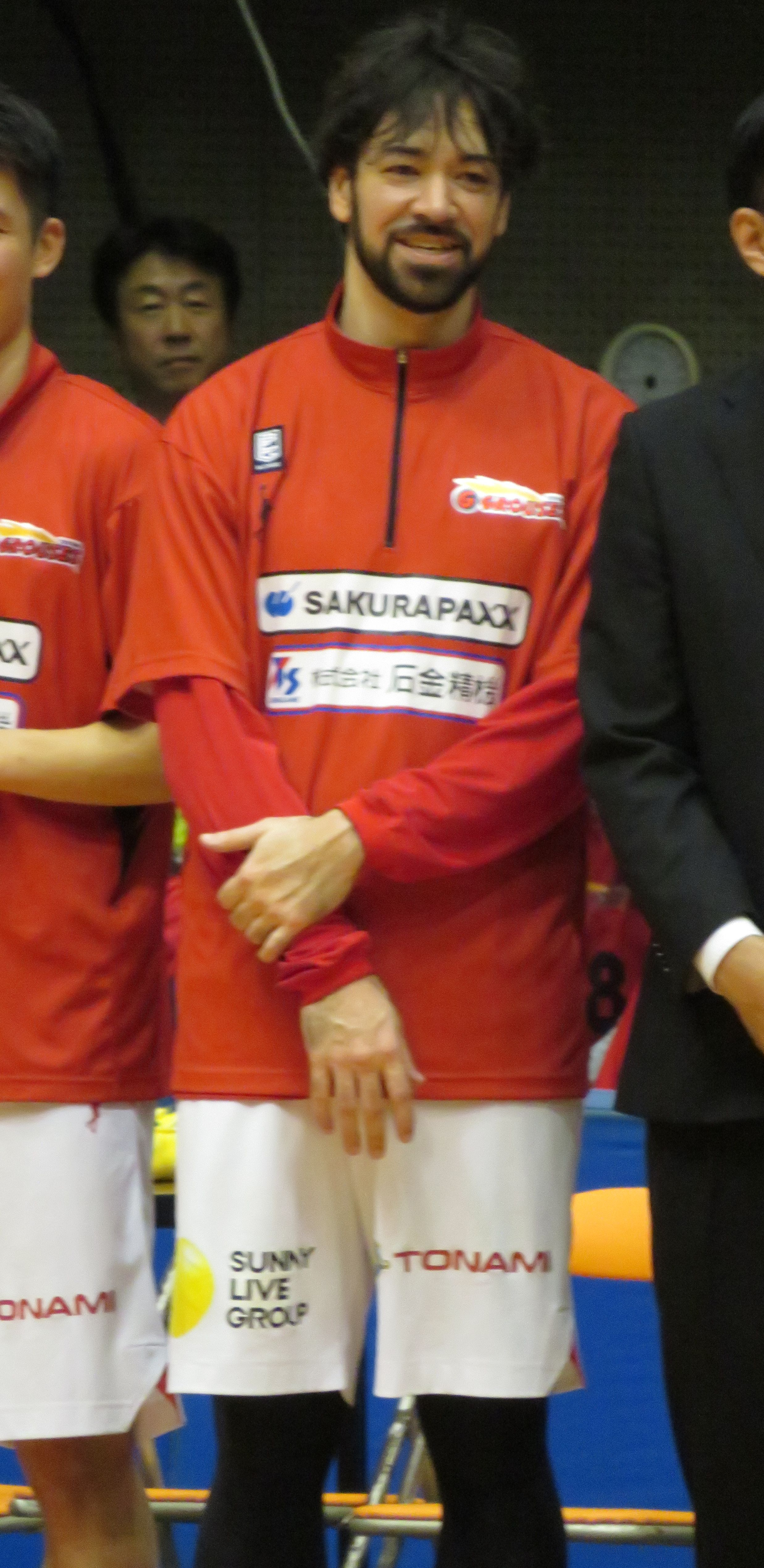

Personal information
- Born: July 19, 1985 (age 41) Mitaka, Tokyo
- Listed height: 6 ft 5 in (1.96 m)
- Listed weight: 207 lb (94 kg)

Career information
- High school: Hachioji Academy (Hachioji, Tokyo)
- College: San Diego City College
- Playing career: 2004–2020
- Coaching career: 2019–present

Career history

Playing
- 2004-2005: Far East Ballers
- 2004-2005: Yokohama Giga Cats
- 2005: Legend
- 2008: High Desert Rattlers
- 2008: Rizing Fukuoka
- 2009: Toyama Grouses
- 2009-2010: Tokyo Apache
- 2010-2013: Rera Kamuy Hokkaido
- 2013-2016: Kumamoto Volters
- 2016-2017: Toyama Grouses
- 2017-2018: San-en NeoPhoenix
- 2018-2019: Toyama Grouses
- 2019-2020: Tryhoop Okayama

Coaching
- 2019-2020: Tryhoop Okayama (asst)
- 2020-2023: Tryhoop Okayama

Hilke Kenji William (比留木 謙司, Hiruki Kenji; born July 19, 1985) is a Japanese basketball coach and former professional basketball player. He also played for the Japan men's national 3x3 team.
