= Tatsumi Yoda =

Japanese business magnate

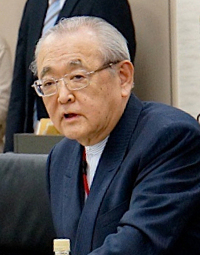
- Born: May 27, 1940 (age 86); Nagano City, Japan
- Other name: Thomas Yoda
- Education: Meiji University
- Occupation: Business magnate
- Known for: Founder of Avex Group; Tokyo International Film Festival a pillar in Japanese entertainment

Tatsumi (Tom) Yoda (依田 巽, Yoda Tatsumi; born May 27, 1940) is a Japanese business magnate.

== Profile ==
Born on May 27, 1940 in Nagano City, Nagano Prefecture, Tatsumi (nicknamed Tom) graduated from Nagano Hhigh School in 1959 before earning a degree in Business Administration from Meiji University in 1963.

He began his professional career at Osada Electric in 1963, later moving to Sansui Electric in 1969.

After resigning as the Director of Sansui Electric in 1988, he founded T.Y.Limited, originally named Thomas Yoda Limited.

That same year, he met Max Matsuura and others, leading him to become an advisor to Avex D.D. (now Avex Inc.). He was appointed Chairman in 1992 and served as Chairman of the Board /CEO from 1993 to 2004. In 2003, he became Chairman of the Recording Industry Association of Japan.

In 1999, he joined Gaga Communications as a director.

After stepping down as Chairman of Avex in 2004, he was appointed Chairman of Gaga Communications (now Gaga Corporation) and currently serves as President and CEO.

For many years, he has played a pivotal role in promoting Japanese entertainment content on the global stage.

From 2008, he served as Chairman of the Tokyo International Film Festival (TIFF & TIFFCOM) for five years, pioneering the introduction of a green carpet with an ecological theme, ahead of other film festivals worldwide.

In 2024, he was appointed Chairman of the Japan Culture and Entertainment Industry Promotion Association (CEIPA) and contributed to the establishment of the Music Award Japan.

== Other Institutions Served ==
Aside from Avex and Sansui:

- Osada Electric (1969)
- International Federation of the Phonographic Industry (2000–2004)
- Japan/China Year 2002
- Cabinet Secretariat of Japan (2002–2007)
- Ministry of Economy, Trade and Industry (2003)
- Japan/Korea Friendship Year 2005
- The Foundation for Promotion of Music, Industry and Culture (2001–2006)
- The Japan-China Exchange Year of Culture and Sports 2007
- Rakuten Inc. (2003–2011)
