= Yōichi Aoyama =

Male Japanese popular music artist

Aoyama Yōichi (青山 陽一) is a male Japanese popular music artist who started his career as a member of GRANDFATHERS.

His album Blues for Tomato reached #255 in the Oricon charts on 31 October 2011.

== Discography ==
=== Singles ===
- 'Saigo ha Nudo' (23 December 1998)
- 'STARLAB' (19 January 2000)
- 'Nanpasen no Seira' (25 April 2001)
- 'Come and Go' (26 June 2002)

=== Albums ===
- SINGS WITH THE BLUE MOUNTAINS (20 May 1990)
- Home Fever (6 June 1993)
- one or six (10 October 1995)
- Ah (15 November 1997)
- SONGS TO REMEMBER (24 February 1999)
- SO FAR SO CLOSE (21 January 1999)
- EQ (23 February 2000)
- Bugcity (6 June 2001)
- Jaw (7 August 2002)
- ODREL (26 May 2004)
