= Tryhoop Okayama =

Professional basketball team

- Division: Third
- Leagues: B.League
- Founded: 2018
- Arena: Zip Arena Okayama
- Location: Okayama, Okayama
- Team manager: Kenji Hilke
- Head coach: Kenji Hilke
- Website: www.tryhoop.com
Home	Away

The Tryhoop Okayama is a professional basketball team based in Okayama. The team most recently competed in the third division of the B.League. Starting from the 2026–27 season, the team will compete in the B.League One, the league's second division, as a member of the Western Conference. They began play in the 2019–2020 season. Their main home court is Zip Arena in Okayama City.

== Coaches ==
- Yoichi Motoyasu
- Satoshi Toyao
- Kenji Hilke

== Roster ==
Tryhoop Okayama roster
Players
Coaches

Pos.	No.	Nat.	Name	Ht.	Wt.	Age
G	0	(Japan)	Yuito Hanada	1.76 m (5 ft 9 in)	71 kg (157 lb)	23 – 6 October 2002
F	2	(Japan)	Yuta Kono	1.90 m (6 ft 3 in)	88 kg (194 lb)	28 – 29 January 1998
PG	3	(Japan)	Taito Urano	1.70 m (5 ft 7 in)	71 kg (157 lb)	27 – 9 April 1999
SG	18	(Japan)	Rikuto Okada	1.74 m (5 ft 9 in)	76 kg (168 lb)	33 – 7 May 1993
SG	22	(Japan)	Yusuke Mukai	1.81 m (5 ft 11 in)	83 kg (183 lb)	34 – 10 September 1991
G	27	(Japan)	Sora Suzuki	1.80 m (5 ft 11 in)	82 kg (181 lb)	29 – 19 April 1997
G/F	31	(Japan)	Keisuke Takabatake	1.83 m (6 ft 0 in)	83 kg (183 lb)	36 – 17 March 1990
SG	91	(Japan)	Taisei Sato	1.80 m (5 ft 11 in)	78 kg (172 lb)	25 – 20 May 2001
F		(Finland)	Alex Murphy	2.06 m (6 ft 9 in)	100 kg (220 lb)	33 – 3 June 1993

Head coach

(Japan) Isamu Omori

Legend

- (C) Team captain
- Injured

- Roster
Updated: 1 July 2024

Note: Flags indicate national team eligibility at FIBA-sanctioned events. Players may hold other non-FIBA nationalities not displayed.

== Notable players ==
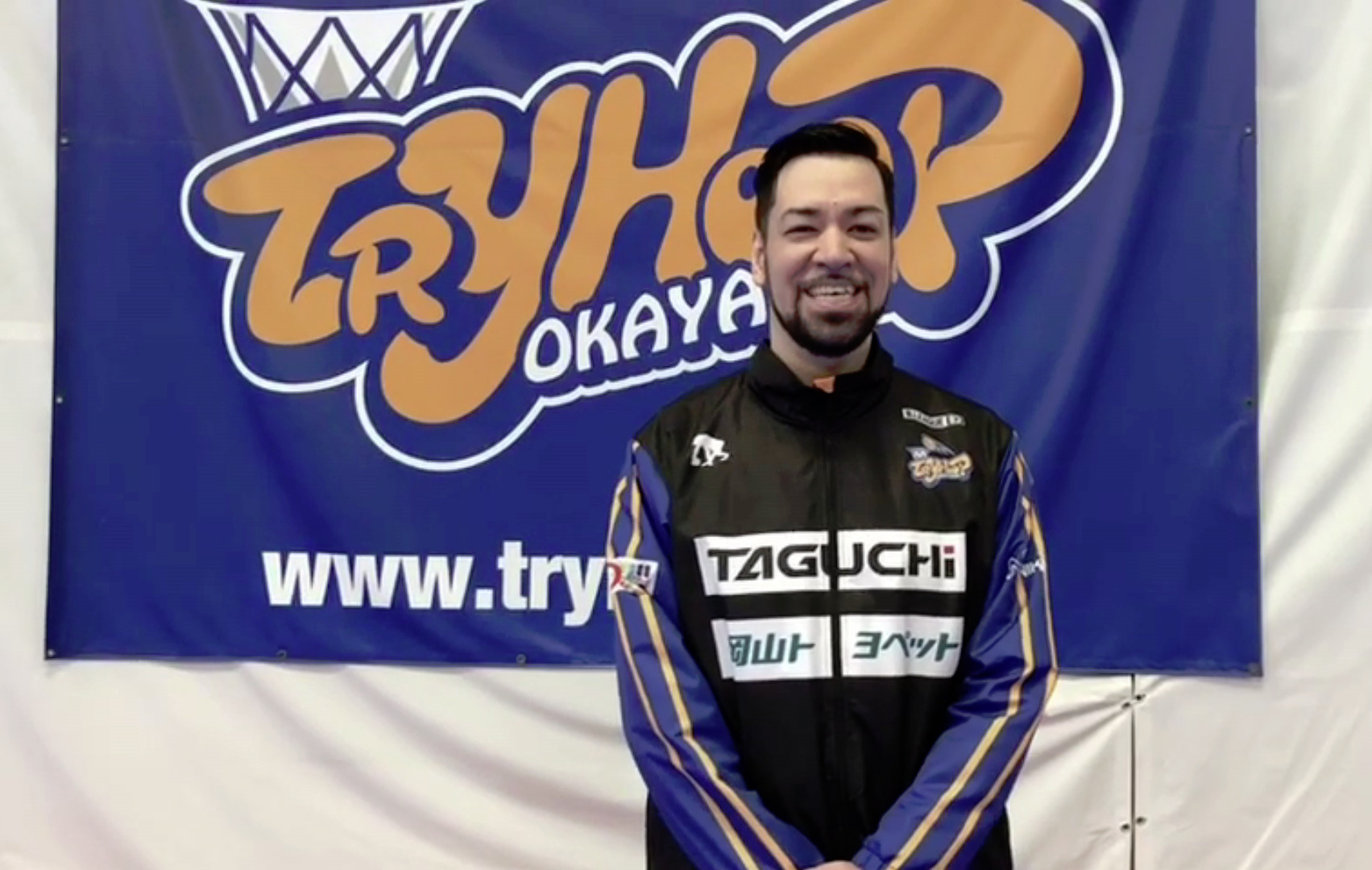
Hilke Kenji

- Kenji Hilke
- Chukwudiebere Maduabum
- Alex Murphy
- Jeff Parmer
- Nigel Spikes
- DeVaughn Washington

== Arenas ==
- Zip Arena Okayama
- Kasaoka General Gymnasium
- Okayama Gakugeikan High School
- Mitsu Sports Park
- Mimasaka Arena
- Tsuyama General Gymnasium
