= Lovely Doll =

Japanese female idol group

- Also known as: Rabudoru
- Origin: Japan
- Genres: J-pop, pop
- Years active: 2011–present
- Labels: Arc Jewel (2012–2013); Crown Gold (2014); Fujiyama Project Japan (2015–present)
- Members: Miyu Aisako; Yuriko Sano; Haruna; Riona Ota; Miki Sakura; Emi Ando
- Website: lovelydoll.jp

Lovely Doll (愛乙女★DOLL, Raburī Dōru) is a Japanese female idol group, managed by Arc Jewel.

== Members ==
| Name | Birth date and age | Gen. | Color | Notes |
|---|---|---|---|---|
| Miyu Aisako (愛迫みゆ) | November 30, 1991 (age 33) | 1 | Pink | Former AKB48 kenkyūsei. Former leader (2011–2013). |
| Yuriko Sano (佐野友里子) | January 22, 1992 (age 33) | 4 | Yellow | Former AKB48 kenkyūsei. Leader (2016–present). |
| Haruna (ハルナ) | June 16, 1999 (age 26) | 4 | Green | |
| Riona Ota (太田里織菜) | December 31, 1996 (age 28) | 5 | Red | Former NMB48 member. |
| Miki Sakura (佐倉みき) | September 6, 1995 (age 30) | 5 | White | |

=== Former members ===
| Name | Birth date and age | Gen. | Notes |
|---|---|---|---|
| Miyu Hanazono (花園まゆ) | June 1, 1990 (age 35) | 1 | Left on April 2, 2011 |
| Marina Kanno (管野まりな) | May 16, 1991 (age 34) | 1 | Left on August 12, 2012 |
| Akane Iwata (岩田あかね) | December 13, 1989 (age 35) | 1 | Left on September 2, 2012 |
| Mirano Matsudo (松戸ミラノ) | February 28, 1994 (age 31) | 4 | Left on March 22, 2013. Kenkyūsei. |
| Mai Hinatsuki (雛月麻衣) | March 13, 1995 (age 30) | 4 | Left on March 31, 2013. Kenkyūsei. |
| Yuki Iwasaki (岩崎夢生) | October 16, 1992 (age 33) | 2 | Left on April 4, 2015 |
| Aya Ashizaki (芦崎麻耶) | March 18, 1993 (age 32) | 2 | Left on May 5, 2015 |
| Kana Suzuki (都築かな) | January 28, 1995 (age 30) | 4 | Left on May 5, 2015 |
| Arisa Yoshihashi (吉橋亜理砂) | March 12, 1996 (age 29) | 5 | Left on January 23, 2017 |
| Rira Nakagawa (中川梨来) | July 24, 1999 (age 26) | 5 | Left on January 23, 2017 |
| Karen Asahina (朝比奈花恋) | January 20, 1994 (age 31) | 6 | Left on June 10, 2018 |
| Emi Ando (安藤笑) | August 7, 1995 (age 30) | 6.5 | Left on December 8, 2018 |

== Discography ==
=== Albums ===
List of studio albums, with selected chart positions
| Title | Album details | Peak | |
| Title | Album details | JPN | JPN Hot. (Note: The Billboard Japan Hot Albums chart was established in June 2015.) |
|---|---|---|---|
| Doll Collection I | Released: 13 August 2013; Label: Arc Jewel; Formats: CD | 86 | — |
| Doll Collection II | Released: 3 May 2016; Label: Fujiyama Project Japan; Formats: CD, CD+DVD | 15 | 35 |

=== Singles ===
List of singles, with selected chart positions
| Title | Year | Peak | | Album |
| Title | Year | JPN | JPN Hot. | Album |
Arc Jewel (Indies)
| "Go!ǃ My Wish!ǃ/Love & Peace" | 2012 | — (Note: "Go!ǃ My Wish!ǃ/Love & Peace" did not enter the Oricon Singles Chart, but peaked at number 1 on the Oricon Indies Singles Chart.) | — | Doll Collection I |
| "Go!ǃ My Wish!ǃ/Love & Peace/Kimi no Yubikiri" | 2012 | — | — | Doll Collection I |
| "Bitter Choco Valentine" | 2013 | 24 | — | Doll Collection I |
| "Paradise in the Summer" | 2013 | 10 | 40 | Doll Collection I |
| "Aoi Sora no Nozomu nara" | 2013 | 9 | 25 | Doll Collection II |
Crown Gold (Major)
| "High Jump!ǃ" | 2014 | 7 | 34 | Doll Collection II |
| "Setsunatsu Diver" | 2014 | 11 | 20 | Doll Collection II |
| "Bargain Girl" | 2014 | 8 | 23 | Non-album single |
Fujiyama Project Japan
| "Calendar Girl" | 2015 | 7 | 34 | Non-album singles |
| "Heatup Dreamer" | 2015 | 5 | 23 | Non-album singles |
| "Lovely Meramera Summer Time" | 2016 | 14 | 26 | Non-album singles |
| "Yoake Mae, Niji ga Sasu" | 2017 | 7 | 37 | Non-album singles |
| "Hikari no Symphony" | 2017 | 8 | 39 | Non-album singles |
| "Mirai Koro" | 2019 | 5 | — | Non-album singles |
