= Watashi (album) =

わたし (Watashi)

Studio album by Jun Shibata
- Released: March 30, 2005
- Genre: J-pop
- Length: 0:49:49
- Label: Dreamusic
- Producer: Jun Shibata

Jun Shibata chronology
Hitori (2004)	わたし (Watashi) (2005)	Single Collection (2005)

Watashi (Me) is Jun Shibata's fourth and last studio album with Dreamusic. It was released on March 30, 2005 and peaked at number 6 in Japan.

== Track listing ==
1. Okaerinasai. (おかえりなさい。; Welcome Home.)
2. Shiroi sekai (白い世界; White World)
3. Game (ゲーム; Game)
4. Ano natsu (あの夏; That Summer)
5. Chiisana boku e (ちいさなぼくへ; To the Small Me)
6. Itsuka oujisama mo♪~Haikei, oujisama☆Zokuhen~ (いつか王子様も♪～拝啓、王子様☆続編～; Someday the Prince Too: Dear, Prince Continuation)
7. Michibata (道端; Roadside)
8. Mata ashita (また明日; See You Tomorrow)
9. Maboroshi (幻; Illusion)
10. Hitorigurashi (一人暮らし; Living Alone)
11. Watashi no yume (わたしの夢; My Dream)

== Charts ==
Release	Chart	Peak position	Sales total
March 30, 2005	Oricon Weekly Albums Chart	6	43,789
