= Funky Monkey Babys =

Japanese band

- Also known as: Fan-mon
- Origin: Hachiōji, Tokyo, Japan
- Genres: Hip-pop; rap rock
- Years active: 2004-2013
- Label: Dreamusic Incorporated
- Members: Funky Kato; Mon-kichi; DJ Chemical
- Website: funkymonkeybabys.com

Funky Monkey Babys (ファンキー・モンキー・ベイビーズ) is a Japanese band formed in 2004 under the record company Dreamusic Incorporated.

Their music is mostly hip hop, but is also inspired by pop and rock music. All members in the group are from Hachiōji, Tokyo. They are known for featuring celebrities in their promotion videos and singles jackets. The band is also known as Fan-mon (ファンモン) in short. Band members include Funky Kato, Monica and DJ Chemical.

== History ==
Their fourth single, "Lovin' Life", is a charted hit that recorded long sales and received multiple high rankings on the Japanese sales charts in the first half of 2007. In July 2007, they released another single, "Chippoke na Yūki". They attracted fans with their high energy live performances all over Japan and continued to gain popularity in various popular media.

On 10 February 2010, the band released their first greatest-hits album Funky Monkey Babys Best. The album debuted at number one on the Japanese Oricon weekly charts with the first week sales of around 255,000 copies.

They announced their intent to disband after their final tour in 2013 on 29 November 2012. Their last live concerts were held at the Tokyo Dome on 1 and 2 June 2013.

Their song ちっぽけな勇気 was also featured in the Japanese television series Asuko March.

== Members ==
- Funky Kato (ファンキー加藤) – MC
- Mon-kichi (モン吉) – MC
- DJ Chemical (DJケミカル) – DJ

== Discography ==
=== Singles ===
Number	Release	Title	Highest rank
1	25 January 2006	"そのまんま東へ" ("Sono Manma Higashi e")	77th
2	26 April 2006	"恋の片道切符" ("Koi no Katamichi Kippu")	31st
3	21 June 2006	"Always"	55th
4	24 January 2007	"Lovin' Life"	10th
5	23 May 2007	"ちっぽけな勇気" ("Chippoke na Yūki")	8th
6	31 October 2007	"もう君がいない" (Mō Kimi ga Inai)	8th
7	26 March 2008	"旅立ち" ("Tabidachi")	10th
8	23 July 2008	"告白" ("Kokuhaku")	4th
9	5 November 2008	"希望の唄/風" ("Kibou no Uta/Kaze")	11th
DVD	28 January 2009	"雪が降る街" ("Yuki ga Furu Machi")	34th
10	18 February 2009	"桜" ("Sakura")	7th
11	18 November 2009	"ヒーロー/明日へ" ("Hero/Ashita e")	4th
Limited distribution	9 December 2009	"ふるさと" ("Furusato")	
12	27 January 2010	"涙/夢" ("Namida/Yume")	4th
13	12 May 2010	"大切" ("Taisetsu")	6th
14	4 August 2010	"あとひとつ" ("Ato Hitotsu")	8th
15	16 March 2011	"ランウェイ☆ビート" ("Runway Beat")	5th
16	8 June 2011	"それでも信じてる/ラブレター" ("Soredemo Shinjiteru"; "Love Letter")	10th
17	16 November 2011	"Love Song"	10th

=== Albums ===
Number	Release	Title	Highest rank
1	19 July 2006	ファンキーモンキーベイビーズ (Funky Monkey Babys)	15th
2	12 December 2007	ファンキーモンキーベイビーズ 2 (Funky Monkey Babys 2)	5th
3	4 March 2009	ファンキーモンキーベイビーズ 3 (Funky Monkey Babys 3)	1st
Compilation	10 February 2010	ファンキーモンキーベイビーズ Best (Funky Monkey Babys Best)	1st
4	21 December 2011	ファンキーモンキーベイビーズ 4 (Funky Monkey Babys 4)	1st

== See also ==
- List of Dreamusic Incorporated artists
- List of Japanese hip-hop musicians
- List of Japanese rock bands
- Music of Japan
