= Hitori (album) =

ひとり (Hitori)

Studio album by Jun Shibata
- Released: 25 February 2004
- Genre: J-pop
- Length: 0:56:29
- Label: Dreamusic
- Producer: Jun Shibata

Jun Shibata chronology
Tameiki (2003)	ひとり (Hitori) (2004)	Watashi (2005)

Hitori (Alone) is Jun Shibata's third studio album. It was released on 25 February 2004 and peaked at No. 15 in Japan.

== Track listing ==
1. Shoujo (少女; Girl)
2. Niji (虹; Rainbow)
3. Miseinen (未成年; Underage)
4. Ashiato~Piano Solo~ (足跡～Piano Solo～; Footsteps: Piano Solo)
5. Anata to no hibi (あなたとの日々; The Days with You)
6. Kanawanai (かなわない; Impossible)
7. Yuuhi~Piano Solo~ (夕日～Piano Solo～; Sunset: Piano Solo)
8. Yuki no oto (雪の音; The Sound of Snow)
9. Konbini (コンビニ; Convenience Store)
10. Kon'ya, kimi no koe ga kikitai (今夜、君の声が聞きたい; Tonight, I want to Hear Your Voice)
11. Hitori aruki (ひとり歩き; Walking Alone)

== Charts ==
Relayse	Chart	Peak position	Sales total
25 February 2004	Oricon Weekly Albums Chart	15	39,922
