= Tsukiyo no Ame =

月夜の雨 (Tsukiyo no Ame)

Studio album by Jun Shibata
- Released: February 21, 2007
- Genre: J-pop
- Length: 0:51:01
- Label: Victor Entertainment
- Producer: Jun Shibata

Jun Shibata chronology
Single Collection (2005)	月夜の雨 (Tsukiyo no Ame) (2007)	Shibaura (2007)

Alternative covers
- CD+DVD cover

Tsukiyo no Ame ('Rain on a moonlit night') is Jun Shibata's fifth studio album and the first with Victor Entertainment. It was released on February 21, 2007, and peaked at number 9.

== Track listing ==
1. "Prologue" (プロローグ; 'Prologue')
2. "Ao no jikan" (青の時間; 'Blue Time')
3. "Hiromi"
4. "Namida gohan" (涙ごはん; 'Meal of Tears')
5. "Tsukiyobatake ~vocal solo~" (月夜畑 ～vocal solo～; 'Field on a Moonlight Night: Vocal Solo')
6. "Hanafubuki" (花吹雪; 'Falling Cherry Blossoms')
7. "Mayonaka no chocolate" (真夜中のチョコレート; 'Midnight Chocolate')
8. "Tsuma ouji☆彡 (Haikei oujisama☆Daisanshou)" (つまおうじ☆彡 (拝啓王子様☆第三章); 'Wife and Prince (Dear Prince: Third Chapter)')
9. "Ningyo no koe" (人魚の声; 'Mermaid's Voice')
10. "Amayo no tsuki ~piano solo~" (雨夜の月 ～piano solo～; 'Rainy Night Moon: Piano Solo')
11. "Guren no tsuki" (紅蓮の月; 'Crimson Moon')
12. "Kimi ga omoeba..." (君が思えば…; 'If I Think of You...')
13. "Watashi no monogatari" (私の物語; 'My Story')

== Charts ==
Release	Chart	Peak position	Sales total
February 21, 2007	Oricon Daily Albums Chart	7	
February 21, 2007	Oricon Weekly Albums Chart	9	31,665
