= Shin'ai Naru Kimi e =

親愛なる君へ (Shin'ai Naru kimi e)

Studio album by Jun Shibata
- Released: 18 June 2008
- Genre: J-pop
- Length: 0:45:45
- Label: Victor Entertainment
- Producer: Jun Shibata

Jun Shibata chronology
Shibaura (2007)	親愛なる君へ (Shin'ai Naru kimi e) (2008)

Shin'ai Naru Kimi e (To my beloved you) is Jun Shibata's sixth studio album. It was released on 18 June 2008.

== Track listing ==
1. Colorful (カラフル; Colorful)
2. Tsubaki (椿; Camellia)
3. Ai wo suru hito (愛をする人; People Who Fall in Love)
4. Melody (メロディ; Melody)
5. 38.0°C～Piano Solo
6. Kimi e (君へ; To You)
7. Juu kazoete (十数えて; Count to Ten)
8. Futari (ふたり; Us)
9. Naite ii hi made (泣いていい日まで; Until the Day When It's Okay to Cry)
10. Kotori to kaze (小鳥と風; A Small Bird and the Wind)

== Charts ==
Release	Chart	Peak position	Sales total
18 June 2008	Oricon Daily Albums Chart	6	
18 June 2008	Oricon Weekly Albums Chart	9	23,168
18 June 2008	Oricon Yearly Albums Chart	406	
