= Tameiki (album) =

ため息 (Tameiki)

Studio album by Jun Shibata
- Released: February 26, 2003
- Genre: J-pop
- Length: 0:53:39
- Label: Dreamusic
- Producer: Jun Shibata

Jun Shibata chronology
Oort no Kumo (2002)	ため息 (Tameiki) (2003)	Hitori (2004)

Tameiki (Sigh) is Jun Shibata's second studio album and best-selling to date. It was released on February 26, 2003 and peaked at No. 12 in Japan.

== Track listing ==
1. Yume (夢; Dream)
2. Tonari no heya (隣の部屋; The Room Next Door)
3. Kataomoi (片想い; One-Sided Love)
4. Circus~Piano Solo~ (サーカス～Piano Solo～; Circus)
5. Haikei, oujisama☆ (拝啓、王子様☆; Dear, Prince)
6. Gekkouyoku (月光浴; Moonlight Bath)
7. Utsukushii hito (美しい人; Beautiful Person)
8. Nani mo nai basho-Hikigatari- (なにもない場所－弾き語り－; Empty Place: Hikigatari) ^{1}
9. Tameiki (ため息; Sigh)
10. Tsuki no mado (月の窓; Window of the Moon)
11. Mejiro no kokoro~Piano Solo~ (めじろの心～Piano Solo～; White-Eyed Heart: Piano Solo)

^{1}Hikigatari means to sing to one's own accompaniment.

== Charts ==
Release	Chart	Peak position	Sales total
February 26, 2003	Oricon Weekly Albums Chart	12	83,503
