= Hoops Dome =

Basketball arena in Lapu-Lapu, Philippines

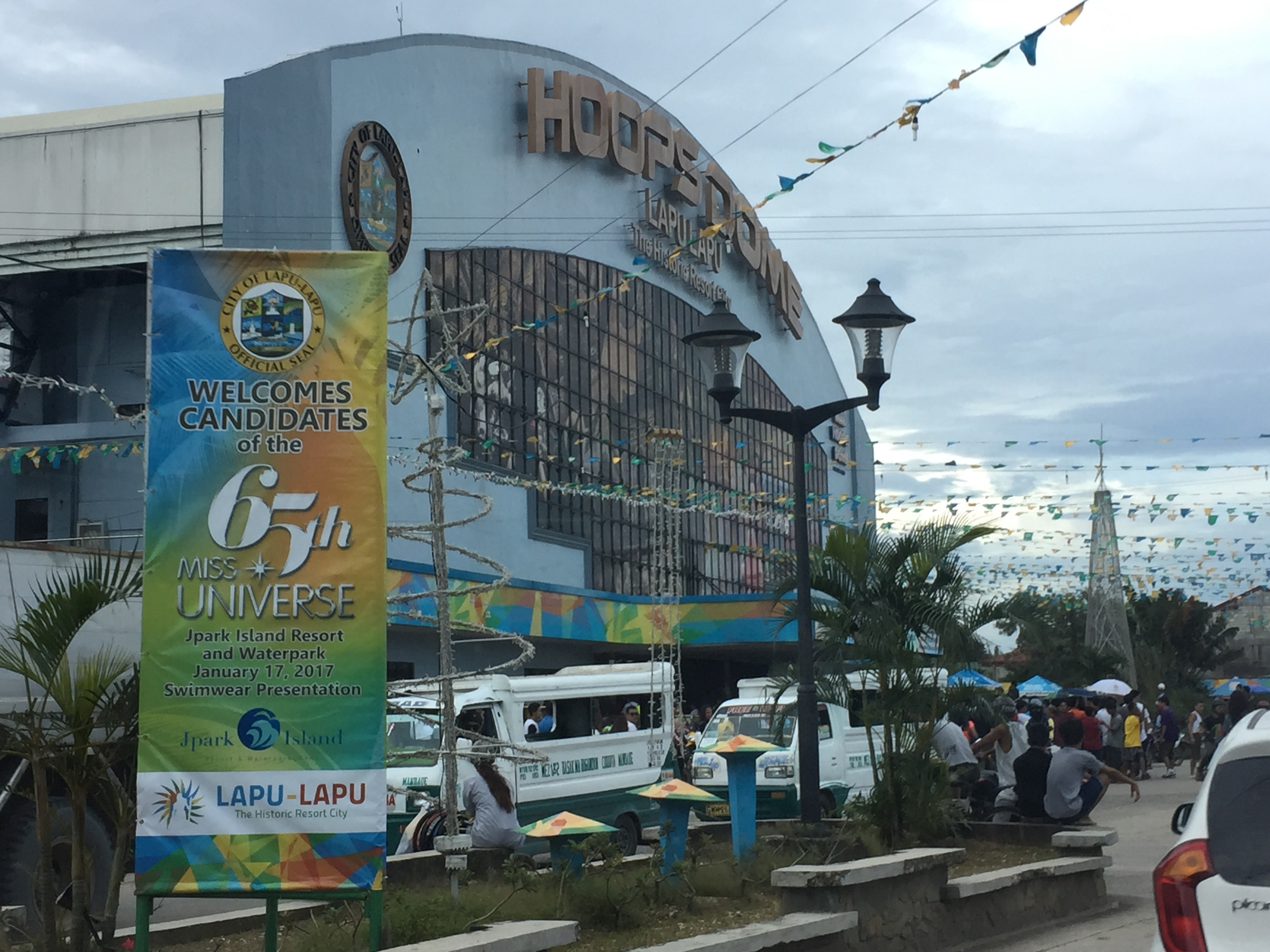
- The facade of the arena, viewed from the northeast side.
- Interactive map of Hoops Dome
- Location: Lapu-Lapu, Cebu, Philippines
- Coordinates: 10°18′19″N 123°57′26″E
- Owner: Lapu-Lapu City Government
- Capacity: 4,600
- Surface: 4,000 square metres (43,000 sq ft)
- Public transit: MI-03B Cordova - MEPZ 1; SU Cordova - IT Park

Construction
- Built: 2008
- Opened: July 2, 2011; 15 years ago
- Cost: ₱192 million

Tenants
- Philippine Basketball Association (out-of-town games); San Miguel Alab Pilipinas (ABL) (2018–2020); Cebu Greats (MPBL) (2018–present): Major events hosted; 2017 PBA All-Star Week Visayas leg 2024 East Asia Super League Final Four

The Hoops Dome is an indoor arena in Lapu-Lapu, Cebu, Philippines. The venue occupies an area of 4,000 square metres. The Hoops Dome was completed in 2008 and was formally opened on July 2, 2011. It has hosted numerous PBA games since opening in 2011, most notably the Visayas leg of the 2017 PBA All-Star Week on April 30, 2017. It is also one of the home arenas of the Cebu Casino Ethyl Alcohol during the team's tenure in the Maharlika Pilipinas Basketball League from 2018 until 2020.

The arena hosted the inaugural Final Four of the East Asia Super League in the 2023–24 season.

== Events ==
=== PBA out-of-town games ===
Date	Winning team	Result	Losing team	Ref.
November 5, 2011	Petron Blaze Boosters	86–80	Alaska Aces	
March 24, 2012	Talk N' Text Tropang Texters	102–90	Rain or Shine Elasto Painters	
June 2, 2012	Barangay Ginebra Kings	100–77	Meralco Bolts	
November 10, 2012	San Mig Coffee Mixers	77–68	Alaska Aces	
January 21, 2017	San Miguel Beermen	106–100	GlobalPort Batang Pier	
April 30, 2017 (2017 All-Star Week)	Gilas Pilipinas	125–112	PBA Visayas All-Stars	
August 26, 2017	Barangay Ginebra San Miguel	94–80	Alaska Aces	
November 9, 2019	Rain or Shine Elasto Painters	91–85	San Miguel Beermen	

=== EASL games ===
Date	Home team	Result	Away team	Phase	Ref.
March 8, 2024	(Japan) Chiba Jets	92–84	(Chinese Taipei) New Taipei Kings	2023–24 Final Four semifinals	
March 8, 2024	(South Korea) Seoul SK Knights	94–79	(South Korea) Anyang Jung Kwan Jang Red Boosters	2023–24 Final Four semifinals	
March 10, 2024	(South Korea) Anyang Jung Kwan Jang Red Boosters	78–76	(Chinese Taipei) New Taipei Kings	2023–24 Final Four third place game	
March 10, 2024	(South Korea) Seoul SK Knights	69–72	(Japan) Chiba Jets	2023–24 Final Four final	

Preceded by Smart Araneta Coliseum	Host of the PBA All-Star Game; 2017	Succeeded by Batangas City Sports Coliseum; Davao del Sur Coliseum; University of San Agustin
