= 2023–24 East Asia Super League =

Sports season

East Asia Super League
- Season: 2023–24
- Duration: 11 October 2023 – 10 March 2024
- Teams: 8

Final Four
- Champions: (Japan) Chiba Jets
- Runners-up: (South Korea) Seoul SK Knights
- Third place: (South Korea) Anyang JKJ Red Boosters
- Fourth place: (Chinese Taipei) New Taipei Kings
- Final Four MVP: (Japan) Yuki Togashi (Chiba Jets)

Records
- Biggest home win: Seoul SK Knights 89–57 New Taipei Kings (31 January 2024)
- Biggest away win: Anyang JKJ Red Boosters 69–102 Chiba Jets (13 December 2023)
- Highest scoring: Chiba Jets 115–98 Anyang JKJ Red Boosters (10 January 2024)

Seasons
- ← 2023 (Champions Week) 2024–25 →

The 2023–24 East Asia Super League was the first regular season of the East Asia Super League, an international basketball club competition involving teams from domestic leagues in Japan, South Korea, Philippines and Taiwan. The season started on 11 October 2023, and ended on 10 March 2024.

Originally set to be held from 12 October 2022 to February 2023 under a in home and away format and a Final Four knockout stage, the start of the EASL regular season was postponed to October 2023.

The Chiba Jets won their won their first title after defeating Seoul SK Knights in the final in the Hoops Dome in Lapu-Lapu City, Philippines.

== Team allocation ==
Four leagues are represented for the 2023–24 EASL, namely the champions and runners-up of the Japanese B.League, the Korean Basketball League, the Philippine Basketball Association, and the Taiwanese P. League+.

Prior to the postponement of the season, each of the top two finishing teams of the 2022 PBA Philippine Cup, 2021–22 B.League season, 2021–22 Korean Basketball League, and the champions of the 2021–22 P. League+ season qualified. Initially, the Philippine allocation was unclear since the Philippine Basketball Association holds multiple conferences or tournaments across a single season. Among the possibilities were drawing of lots among the top four PBA teams, forming a selection team or entering the national team. Champions San Miguel Beermen and runners-up TNT Tropang Giga qualified for the EASL season.

However, the PBA later decided that the top two finishing teams of the already finished 2023 PBA Governors' Cup, namely TNT Tropang Giga and Barangay Ginebra San Miguel, will qualify instead. Furthermore, Barangay Ginebra withdrew for undisclosed reasons and were replaced by semifinalists Meralco Bolts shortly prior to the start of the league.

It was also determined that the qualified teams from Japan, South Korea, and Taiwan are based from the 2022–23 season instead of the 2021–22 season. The qualified teams remained largely the same; Utsunomiya Brex originally qualified under the old format. The Chiba Jets qualified instead.

Hong Kong based Chun Yu Bay Area Dragons, a franchise team, were also expected participate. However, the EASL announced the Dragons' disbandment on 1 September 2023 reportedly due to financial reasons. They were later replaced by the 2022–23 P. League+ runners-up New Taipei Kings.

The league considers the P. League+ teams as the representatives of the "Greater China".

Each team may have 12-men roster with two foreign players and an additional Asian player.

League	Country or region	Berths
Franchise team	Hong Kong	~~1~~ 0
P. League+	Chinese Taipei (Note: Taiwan, officially Republic of China. The organizers of the EASL and FIBA uses the designation of "Chinese Taipei".)	1+1
B.League	Japan	2
Korean Basketball League	South Korea	2
Philippine Basketball Association	Philippines	2

=== Qualified teams ===
Team	Domestic league standing
~~(Hong Kong) Chun Yu Bay Area Dragons~~ (Note: Disbanded prior to the start of the season.)	N/A (EASL franchise)
(Chinese Taipei) Taipei Fubon Braves	2022–23 P. League+ champions
(Chinese Taipei) New Taipei Kings	2022–23 P. League+ runners-up
(Japan) Ryukyu Golden Kings	2022–23 B.League champions
(Japan) Chiba Jets	2022–23 B.League runners-up
(South Korea) Anyang Jung Kwan Jang Red Boosters	2022–23 Korean Basketball League champions
(South Korea) Seoul SK Knights	2022–23 Korean Basketball League runners-up
(Philippines) TNT Tropang Giga	2023 PBA Governors' Cup champions
(Philippines) Meralco Bolts (Note: Replaced 2023 PBA Governor's Cup runners-up Barangay Ginebra San Miguel)	2023 PBA Governors' Cup semifinalist

== Preparation ==
=== Original draw and format ===
The initial official draw for the 2022–23 EASL season was held on 28 June 2022 at the Shangri-La at the Fort, Manila in Taguig.

The teams initially were drawn in two groups. A coin flipping mechanic were used; each champion in each domestic league were made to choose a coin side. The winner of the coin flip were placed on Group A while the other placed in Group B.

Each club was to play all the other clubs twice in home and away matches starting from 12 October 2022 to February 2023, with two EASL Group Stage games taking place every Wednesday night. The final four were to be play in a venue in Metro Manila in the Philippines in March 2023.

=== Postponement and resumption ===
A few weeks before the supposed opening day, the league announced the cancellation of the home and away season, instead pushing through with a "Champions Week" that was initially announced to be held in Manila in early 2023. The COVID-19 pandemic was blamed for the cancellation. Japan was later named the host country for this event. The original groups for the postponed season were also the groupings for the Champions Week.

A new draw was held for the EASL season on 21 June 2023.

== Champions Week ==
In December, EASL announced that the Champions Week will be hosted by the qualifying Japanese teams, with the Utsunomiya Brex hosting the first six games, while the Ryukyu Golden Kings hosting the last six games at the Okinawa Arena. The Champions Week would be tagged as a "special tournament" which would proceed the start of the inaugural season proper.

== Group stage ==
=== Group A ===
Pos	Team	Pld	W	L	PF	PA	PD	Qualification
1	(Japan) Chiba Jets	6	6	0	546	450	+96	Semifinals
2	(South Korea) Anyang JKJ Red Boosters	6	4	2	542	537	+5	Semifinals
3	(Philippines) TNT Tropang Giga	6	1 (Note: TNT Tropang Giga 177–175 Taipei Fubon Braves)	5	491	536	−45	
4	(Chinese Taipei) Taipei Fubon Braves	6	1	5	464	520	−56	

Source: EASL
Notes:

11 October 2023	Chiba Jets (Japan)	93–75	(Philippines) TNT Tropang Giga	Funabashi
19:00 (JST)	Scoring by quarter: 21–22, 24–22, 26–12, 22–19
	Pts: Brown, Stephens 19; Rebs: Brown 12; Asts: Ogawa 6	Boxscore	Pts: Miller 22; Rebs: Hollis-Jefferson 9 Asts: Hollis-Jefferson, Montalbo 5	Arena: Funabashi Arena; Attendance: 3,667

18 October 2023	Taipei Fubon Braves (Chinese Taipei)	82–85(OT)	(Japan) Chiba Jets	Taipei
19:00 (TST)	Scoring by quarter: 20–15, 22–14, 13–18, 19–27, Overtime: 8–11
	Pts: Singletary 29; Rebs: Singletary 18; Asts: Barefield, Singletary 4	Boxscore	Pts: Togashi 38; Rebs: Mutts 12; Asts: Togashi 7	Arena: National Taiwan University Sports Center; Attendance: 3,889

25 October 2023	Anyang JKJ Red Boosters (South Korea)	98–77	(Chinese Taipei) Taipei Fubon Braves	Anyang
19:00 (KST)	Scoring by quarter: 31–17, 29–23, 17–23, 21–14
	Pts: Bae 18; Rebs: Monroe 9 Asts: Monroe 10	Boxscore	Pts: Barefield, Johnson 18; Rebs: Johnson 9 Asts: Johnson 6	Arena: Anyang Gymnasium; Attendance: 1,022

1 November 2023	TNT Tropang Giga (Philippines)	66–75	(Japan) Chiba Jets	Santa Rosa
19:00 (PST)	Scoring by quarter: 14–23, 18–27, 24–14, 10–11
	Pts: Miller 22; Rebs: Miller 13; Asts: Castro, Oftana 3	Boxscore	Pts: Mooney 30; Rebs: Mooney 16; Asts: Togashi 5	Arena: City of Santa Rosa Multi-Purpose Complex

15 November 2023	Taipei Fubon Braves (Chinese Taipei)	106–97	(Philippines) TNT Tropang Giga	Taipei
19:00 (TST)	Scoring by quarter: 31–34, 23–18, 30–23, 22–22
	Pts: Johnson 29; Rebs: Singletary 9 Asts: Barefield 7	Boxscore	Pts: Miller 34; Rebs: Miller 10; Asts: Hollis-Jefferson 10	Arena: Taipei Heping Basketball Gymnasium

6 December 2023	Anyang JKJ Red Boosters (South Korea)	105–97	(Philippines) TNT Tropang Giga	Anyang
19:00 (KST)	Scoring by quarter: 32–26, 26–18, 22–23, 25–30
	Pts: Choi 24; Rebs: Monroe 10; Asts: Park 10	Boxscore	Pts: Miller 35; Rebs: Miller 9 Asts: Hollis-Jefferson, Montalbo 5	Arena: Anyang Gymnasium

13 December 2023	Anyang JKJ Red Boosters (South Korea)	69–102	(Japan) Chiba Jets	Anyang
19:00 (KST)	Scoring by quarter: 21–22, 18–27, 14–28, 16–25
	Pts: Abando 17; Rebs: Monroe 11; Asts: Park 4	Boxscore	Pts: Mooney 22; Rebs: Mooney 22; Asts: three players 5	Arena: Anyang Gymnasium

20 December 2023	TNT Tropang Giga (Philippines)	80–69	(Chinese Taipei) Taipei Fubon Braves	Santa Rosa
19:00 (PST)	Scoring by quarter: 17–21, 31–21, 14–16, 18–11
	Pts: Ro. Hollis-Jefferson 35; Rebs: Ro. Hollis-Jefferson 11; Asts: Ro. Hollis-Jefferson 5	Boxscore	Pts: Johnson 19; Rebs: Johnson 20; Asts: Chou 6	Arena: City of Santa Rosa Multi-Purpose Complex

27 December 2023	Chiba Jets (Japan)	76–60	(Chinese Taipei) Taipei Fubon Braves	Funabashi
19:00 (JST)	Scoring by quarter: 17–14, 20–16, 21–13, 18–17
	Pts: Mooney 21; Rebs: Cooks, Mooney 15; Asts: Togashi 6	Boxscore	Pts: Barefield 16; Rebs: Zimmerman 13; Asts: five players 1	Arena: Funabashi Arena; Attendance: 4,125

10 January 2024	Chiba Jets (Japan)	115–98	(South Korea) Anyang JKJ Red Boosters	Funabashi
19:00 (JST)	Scoring by quarter: 24–24, 26–31, 36–19, 29–24
	Pts: Cooks 28; Rebs: Cooks 13; Asts: Cooks 8	Boxscore	Pts: Carter 27; Rebs: four players 3 Asts: Choi 8	Arena: Funabashi Arena; Attendance: 3,774

24 January 2024	TNT Tropang Giga (Philippines)	76–88	(South Korea) Anyang JKJ Red Boosters	Pasig
19:00 (PST)	Scoring by quarter: 19–34, 22–19, 20–18, 15–17
	Pts: Ro. Hollis-Jefferson 33; Rebs: Ra. Hollis-Jefferson 12; Asts: Ro. Hollis-Jefferson 7	Boxscore	Pts: Choi 23; Rebs: Carter, Wilson 14; Asts: Carter, Park 7	Arena: PhilSports Arena

7 February 2024	Taipei Fubon Braves (Chinese Taipei)	70–84	(South Korea) Anyang JKJ Red Boosters	Taipei
19:00 (TST)	Scoring by quarter: 19–28, 20–28, 16–18, 15–10
	Pts: Zaytsev 17; Rebs: Patton 11; Asts: Zaytsev 8	Boxscore	Pts: Carter 21; Rebs: Carter 13; Asts: Wilson 7	Arena: Taipei Heping Basketball Gymnasium

=== Group B ===
Pos	Team	Pld	W	L	PF	PA	PD	Qualification
1	(South Korea) Seoul SK Knights	6	4 (Note: Seoul SK Knights 161–147 New Taipei Kings)	2	475	438	+37	Semifinals
2	(Chinese Taipei) New Taipei Kings	6	4	2	467	483	−16	Semifinals
3	(Japan) Ryukyu Golden Kings	6	3	3	479	453	+26	
4	(Philippines) Meralco Bolts	6	1	5	469	516	−47	

Source: EASL
Notes:

18 October 2023	Ryukyu Golden Kings (Japan)	80–79	(South Korea) Seoul SK Knights	Okinawa
19:00 (JST)	Scoring by quarter: 27–20, 12–20, 22–18, 19–21
	Pts: Imamura 18; Rebs: Law 13; Asts: Law 6	Boxscore	Pts: Warney 39; Rebs: Warney, Williams 10; Asts: Oh J. 5	Arena: Okinawa Arena; Attendance: 5,526

1 November 2023	Seoul SK Knights (South Korea)	82–69	(Japan) Ryukyu Golden Kings	Goyang
19:00 (KST)	Scoring by quarter: 24–17, 18–17, 26–19, 14–16
	Pts: Williams 23; Rebs: Williams 17; Asts: Kim S. 8	Boxscore	Pts: Imamura 15; Rebs: Tamayo 7 Asts: Durham 7	Arena: Goyang Sono Arena; Attendance: 1,164

8 November 2023	New Taipei Kings (Chinese Taipei)	90–72	(South Korea) Seoul SK Knights	New Taipei City
19:00 (TST)	Scoring by quarter: 21–29, 22–14, 26–15, 21–14
	Pts: Manigault 22; Rebs: Manigault 11; Asts: Je. Lin 9	Boxscore	Pts: Warney 45; Rebs: Warney, Williams 11; Asts: Kim S. 4	Arena: Xinzhuang Gymnasium

15 November 2023	Ryukyu Golden Kings (Japan)	89–61	(Philippines) Meralco Bolts	Okinawa
19:00 (JST)	Scoring by quarter: 17–21, 31–13, 21–13, 20–14
	Pts: Imamura 19; Rebs: Durham 9 Asts: Durham 6	Boxscore	Pts: Newsome 11; Rebs: Ibeh 9 Asts: Caram 4	Arena: Okinawa Arena; Attendance: 6,120

29 November 2023	New Taipei Kings (Chinese Taipei)	97–92	(Philippines) Meralco Bolts	New Taipei City
19:00 (TST)	Scoring by quarter: 25–30, 20–18, 20–18, 32–26
	Pts: Je. Lin 25; Rebs: Anigwe 14; Asts: Je. Lin 7	Boxscore	Pts: Lofton 35; Rebs: Ibeh, Newsome 6 Asts: Newsome 4	Arena: Xinzhuang Gymnasium

13 December 2023	Meralco Bolts (Philippines)	97–88(OT)	(Japan) Ryukyu Golden Kings	Macau, China
19:00 (CST)	Scoring by quarter: 17–21, 21–16, 19–20, 23–23, Overtime: 17–8
	Pts: Lofton 35; Rebs: Ibeh 12; Asts: three players 3	Boxscore	Pts: Law 27; Rebs: Cooley 13; Asts: Law 6	Arena: Studio City Event Center

27 December 2023	Meralco Bolts (Philippines)	80–81	(South Korea) Seoul SK Knights	Pasig
19:00 (PST)	Scoring by quarter: 20–20, 13–25, 23–19, 24–17
	Pts: Lofton 32; Rebs: Ibeh 11; Asts: Newsome 6	Boxscore	Pts: Warney 31; Rebs: Williams 8 Asts: Warney 6	Arena: PhilSports Arena

3 January 2024	Meralco Bolts (Philippines)	77–89	(Chinese Taipei) New Taipei Kings	Pasig
19:00 (PST)	Scoring by quarter: 21–21, 26–21, 11–24, 77–89
	Pts: Lofton 20; Rebs: Ibeh 7 Asts: Lofton 4	Boxscore	Pts: Je. Lin 23; Rebs: Anigwe, Je. Lin 10; Asts: Je. Lin, Manigault 4	Arena: PhilSports Arena

10 January 2024	New Taipei Kings (Chinese Taipei)	67–63	(Japan) Ryukyu Golden Kings	New Taipei City
19:00 (TST)	Scoring by quarter: 18–15, 19–14, 15–18, 15–16
	Pts: Manigault 16; Rebs: Manigault 13; Asts: Je. Lin 6	Boxscore	Pts: Tamayo 16; Rebs: Cooley 10; Asts: Imamura 6	Arena: Xinzhuang Gymnasium; Attendance: 5,207

24 January 2024	Ryukyu Golden Kings (Japan)	90–67	(Chinese Taipei) New Taipei Kings	Okinawa
19:00 (JST)	Scoring by quarter: 18–19, 17–21, 29–14, 26–13
	Pts: Durham 21; Rebs: Law 9 Asts: Kishimoto 11	Boxscore	Pts: Blankley 16; Rebs: Anigwe 9 Asts: Lee 4	Arena: Okinawa Arena; Attendance: 6,769

31 January 2024	Seoul SK Knights (South Korea)	89–57	(Chinese Taipei) New Taipei Kings	Seoul
19:00 (KST)	Scoring by quarter: 24–16, 17–21, 23–15, 25–5
	Pts: Warney 34; Rebs: Warney 18; Asts: Yang 7	Boxscore	Pts: Mitchell 12; Rebs: Anigwe 10; Asts: Jo. Lin 7	Arena: Jamsil Students' Gymnasium

7 February 2024	Seoul SK Knights (South Korea)	72–62	(Philippines) Meralco Bolts	Seoul
19:00 (KST)	Scoring by quarter: 14–13, 18–17, 17–18, 23–14
	Pts: Williams 25; Rebs: Williams 19; Asts: Choi W. 14	Boxscore	Pts: Miller 23; Rebs: Tew 21; Asts: three players 3	Arena: Jamsil Students' Gymnasium

== Final round ==
The final round was held at the Hoops Dome in Lapu-Lapu City, Philippines.

Semifinals
(Japan) Chiba Jets	92
(Chinese Taipei) New Taipei Kings	84
(South Korea) Seoul SK Knights	94
(South Korea) Anyang JKJ Red Boosters	79

Final
(Japan) Chiba Jets	72
(South Korea) Seoul SK Knights	69
Third place
(Chinese Taipei) New Taipei Kings	76
(South Korea) Anyang JKJ Red Boosters	78

=== Semifinals ===
Note: All times are Philippine Standard Time (UTC+8).

8 March 2024
17:00

Boxscore

Chiba Jets (Japan)	92–84	(Chinese Taipei) New Taipei Kings
Scoring by quarter: 32–25, 18–22, 16–20, 26–17
Pts: Togashi 28; Rebs: Cooks 23; Asts: Togashi 5		Pts: Jo. Lin 21; Rebs: Manigault 6 Asts: Jo. Lin 5

Hoops Dome, Lapu-Lapu City

8 March 2024
20:00

Boxscore

Seoul SK Knights (South Korea)	94–79	(South Korea) Anyang JKJ Red Boosters
Scoring by quarter: 23–26, 22–14, 22–18, 27–21
Pts: Warney 38; Rebs: Warney 16; Asts: Choi W. 10		Pts: Carter 21; Rebs: Carter 9 Asts: Park 9

Hoops Dome, Lapu-Lapu City

=== Third place game ===
10 March 2024
16:00

Boxscore

Anyang JKJ Red Boosters (South Korea)	78–76	(Chinese Taipei) New Taipei Kings
Scoring by quarter: 18–13, 26–20, 20–24, 14–19
Pts: Park 29; Rebs: Carter 15; Asts: Choi 5		Pts: Manigault 18; Rebs: Manigault 10; Asts: Jo. Lin 7

Hoops Dome, Lapu-Lapu City

=== Final ===
10 March 2024
19:00

Boxscore

Seoul SK Knights (South Korea)	69–72	(Japan) Chiba Jets
Scoring by quarter: 16–21, 18–16, 20–14, 15–21
Pts: Warney 22; Rebs: Warney 17; Asts: Oh J., Warney 5		Pts: Togashi 24; Rebs: Mooney 16; Asts: Togashi 7

Hoops Dome, Lapu-Lapu City
Attendance: 4,234
