= Xavier Cooks =

Australian basketball player (born 1995)

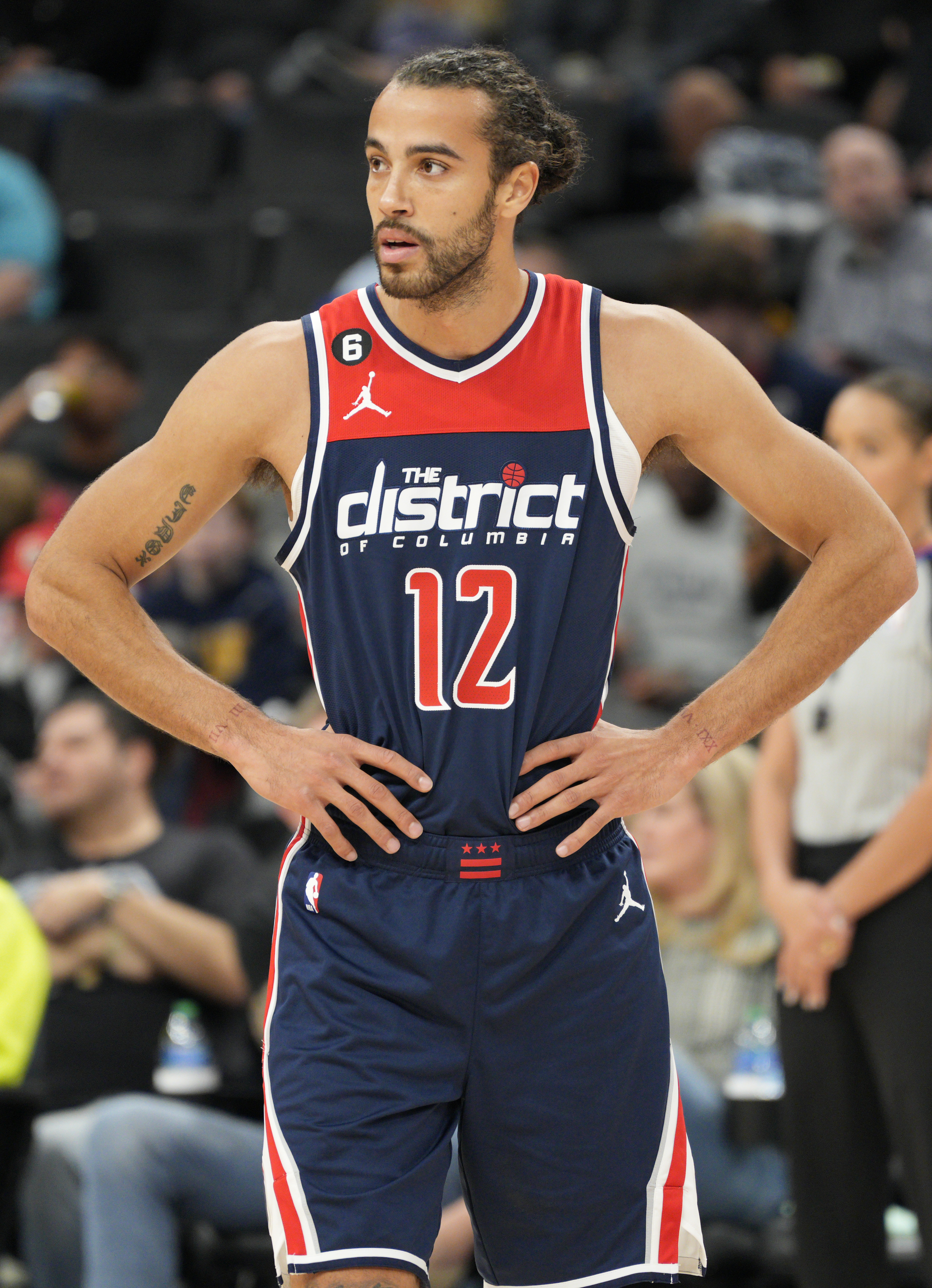
- Cooks with the Washington Wizards in 2023

No. 10 – Sydney Kings
- Position: Power forward
- League: NBL

Personal information
- Born: 19 August 1995 (age 31) Ballarat, Victoria, Australia
- Listed height: 203 cm (6 ft 8 in)
- Listed weight: 83 kg (183 lb)

Career information
- High school: Holy Spirit College (Wollongong, New South Wales)
- College: Winthrop (2014–2018)
- NBA draft: 2018: undrafted
- Playing career: 2013–present

Career history
- 2013: Illawarra Hawks (Waratah)
- 2014: BA Centre of Excellence
- 2018–2019: s.Oliver Würzburg
- 2019–2023: Sydney Kings
- 2022: Wellington Saints
- 2023: Washington Wizards
- 2023–2024: Chiba Jets Funabashi
- 2024–present: Sydney Kings
- 2026: Vaqueros de Bayamón

Career highlights
- EASL champion (2024); 3× NBL champion (2022, 2023, 2026); NBL Grand Final MVP (2022); NBL Most Valuable Player (2023); All-NBL First Team (2023); 3× All-NBL Second Team (2022, 2025, 2026); NZNBL Most Valuable Player (2022); NZNBL All-Star Five (2022); NZNBL Most Outstanding Forward (2022); Big South Player of the Year (2018); 2× First-team All-Big South (2017, 2018); Second-team All-Big South (2016); Big South All-Freshman Team (2015)
- Stats at NBA.com
- Stats at Basketball Reference
Medals
Men's basketball
Representing Australia
FIBA Asia Cup
Gold medal – first place	2025 Saudi Arabia

Xavier Cooks (born 19 August 1995) is an Australian professional basketball player for the Sydney Kings of the National Basketball League (NBL). He played college basketball for the Winthrop Eagles, where he was named the 2018 Big South Conference Player of the Year. In 2022, he helped the Sydney Kings win the NBL championship while earning grand final MVP honours. In 2023, he was named NBL Most Valuable Player and won his second straight NBL championship. He won his third NBL championship with the Kings in 2026.

== Early life ==
Cooks was born in Ballarat, Victoria. He grew up in Wollongong, New South Wales, and attended Holy Spirit College.

In 2013, Cooks played for the Illawarra Hawks in the Waratah League. The following year, he moved to Canberra and played for the BA Centre of Excellence in the South East Australian Basketball League (SEABL).

== College career ==
Cooks moved to the United States in 2014 to play college basketball for the Winthrop Eagles. He chose Winthrop over offers from schools such as UC Santa Barbara, Boise State, Hartford, Maine and Nicholls State.

As a freshman in 2014–15, Cooks was named to the Big South Conference All-Freshman Team. As a sophomore in 2015–16, he earned second-team All-Big South honours.

As a junior in 2016–17, Cooks earned first-team All-Big South. He helped Winthrop win the Big South Tournament and earned Big South All-Tournament Team. On 15 February 2017, he recorded the first 20-point, 20-rebound game for Winthrop since 2003.

As a senior in 2017–18, Cooks was again named first-team All-Big South and the Big South Player of the Year. During the season, he became Winthrop's all-time leading rebounder.

In 2020, Cooks was voted into the Big South Men's Basketball All-Decade Team (2010–19).

== Professional career ==
=== s.Oliver Würzburg (2018–2019) ===
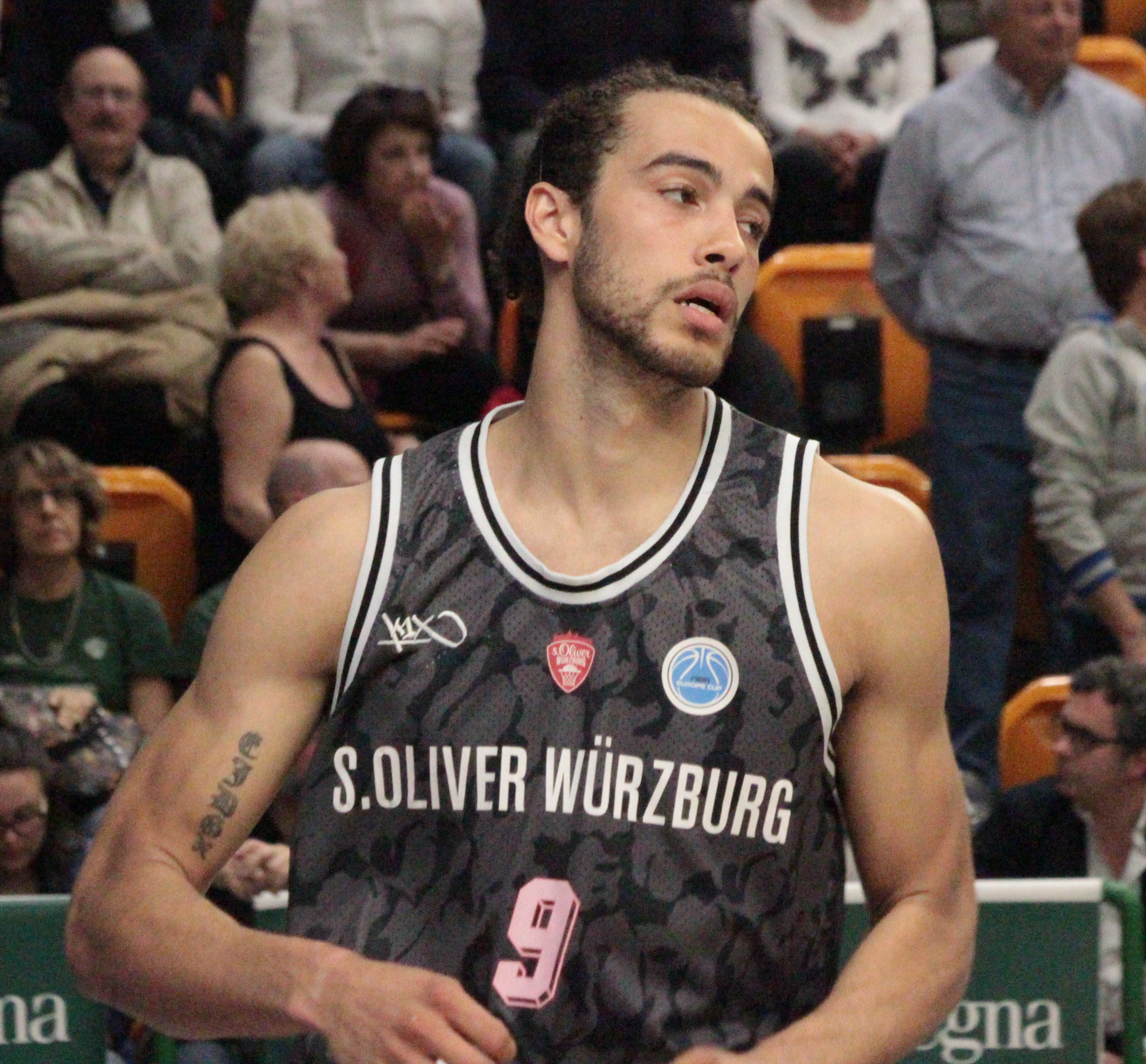
Cooks with s.Oliver Würzburg in 2019

After going undrafted in the 2018 NBA draft, Cooks joined the Golden State Warriors for the 2018 NBA Summer League. He played for s.Oliver Würzburg in Germany in 2018–19 and then joined the Phoenix Suns for the 2019 NBA Summer League.

Cooks initially signed with French team SIG Strasbourg for the 2019–20 season, but left due to injury.

=== Sydney Kings (2019–2023) ===
On 27 November 2019, Cooks signed with the Sydney Kings of the Australian NBL on a multi-year deal. Following the 2019–20 season, Cooks opted out of his deal and then re-signed with the Kings for the 2020–21 NBL season. He averaged 10.3 points, 5.1 rebounds and 2.5 assists per game in his second season with Sydney.

On 30 June 2021, Cooks re-signed with the Kings for the 2021–22 NBL season. He helped the Kings win the 2022 NBL championship while earning grand final MVP honours.

On 18 May 2022, Cooks signed with the Wellington Saints for the rest of the 2022 New Zealand NBL season. He went on to win league MVP, All-Star Five and Most Outstanding Forward.

On 22 June 2022, Cooks re-signed with the Kings on a three-year deal. On 29 January 2023, he had 16 points, 10 rebounds and 10 assists in a 111–106 win over the South East Melbourne Phoenix, marking the league's first triple-double since 2021 and the first from a Sydney player since Dontaye Draper in 2008. He went on to win the NBL Most Valuable Player Award for the 2022–23 season and helped the Kings win back-to-back championships. He finished the season averaging 14.5 points, 7.6 rebounds and 3.6 assists per game.

=== Washington Wizards (2023) ===
On 17 March 2023, Cooks signed with the Washington Wizards of the National Basketball Association (NBA). He made his NBA debut the next day, recording two rebounds in five and a half minutes against the Sacramento Kings. In the Wizards' final game of the season on 9 April, he recorded 10 points and 14 rebounds in 35 minutes as a starter against the Houston Rockets.

On 23 October 2023, Cooks was waived by the Wizards.

=== Chiba Jets Funabashi (2023–2024) ===
On 21 November 2023, Cooks signed with Chiba Jets Funabashi of the B.League. The team won the EASL championship for the 2023–24 season. He averaged over 13 points and eight rebounds in 52 appearances with the Jets.

=== Sydney Kings and Vaqueros de Bayamón (2024–present) ===
On 27 May 2024, Cooks signed a three-year deal with the Sydney Kings. He was named to the All-NBL Second Team for the 2024–25 season. On 11 February 2025, the NBL announced a mandatory provisional one-month suspension had been imposed on Cooks due to an adverse analytical finding from a standard in-competition anti-doping test. He missed the Kings' knock-out final against the Adelaide 36ers. The suspension ended on 7 March 2025 with no further recourse.

In the 2025–26 NBL season, Cooks helped the Kings reach the championship series. He had 19 points, 12 rebounds (seven offensive), four assists, three steals and one block in game 5 to lift the Kings to the championship and Cooks' third title.

Following the 2025–26 NBL season, Cooks joined the Vaqueros de Bayamón of the Baloncesto Superior Nacional for the 2026 season alongside Kings teammate Jaylin Galloway. In 15 games, he averaged 15.3 points, 6.8 rebounds, 1.8 assists and 1.1 blocks per game.

On 4 August 2026, it was revealed that Cooks had served a one-month suspension that ended on 4 July 2026 after testing positive for THC during an in-competition doping control test.

== National team career ==
In 2017, Cooks was named to the Australian "Emerging Boomers" squad for the Summer Universiade.

In early August 2019, Cooks made the final cut for Australia's 2019 FIBA World Cup roster. However, one week later he was forced to withdraw from the competition due to a knee injury sustained during practice.

In April 2025, Cooks was named in the Boomers squad for a trans-Tasman series against New Zealand in May. In July 2025, he was named in the Boomers squad in the lead up to the 2025 FIBA Asia Cup in Saudi Arabia.

== Career statistics ==
Legend
GP	Games played	GS	Games started	MPG	Minutes per game
FG%	Field goal percentage	3P%	3-point field goal percentage	FT%	Free throw percentage
RPG	Rebounds per game	APG	Assists per game	SPG	Steals per game
BPG	Blocks per game	PPG	Points per game	**Bold**	Career high

=== NBA ===
Year	Team	GP	GS	MPG	FG%	3P%	FT%	RPG	APG	SPG	BPG	PPG
2022–23	Washington	10	1	12.6	.607	.000	.400	3.8	.6	.6	.4	3.8
Career		10	1	12.6	.607	.000	.400	3.8	.6	.6	.4	3.8

=== College ===
Year	Team	GP	GS	MPG	FG%	3P%	FT%	RPG	APG	SPG	BPG	PPG
2014–15	Winthrop	32	28	25.8	**.536**	.188	.614	6.1	1.5	.8	1.5	7.8
2015–16	Winthrop	32	**32**	27.6	.518	**.394**	**.765**	7.1	1.8	.8	1.7	14.7
2016–17	Winthrop	**33**	31	29.0	.488	.349	.698	**9.1**	2.8	.9	1.7	16.5
2017–18	Winthrop	30	29	**29.8**	.504	.318	.669	8.8	**3.6**	**1.0**	**2.1**	**17.2**
Career		127	120	28.0	.507	.348	.690	7.7	2.4	.9	1.7	14.0

== Personal life ==
Cooks is the son of Eric and Josie. His father is an African-American expatriate who became a naturalised citizen of Australia, and his mother is Australian. His father played college basketball for St. Mary's College in California before relocating to Australia to pursue a professional career. He has two siblings, Georgia and Dominique. His brother was also a basketball player.
