= Hiroki Sato =

Japanese basketball executive and former player

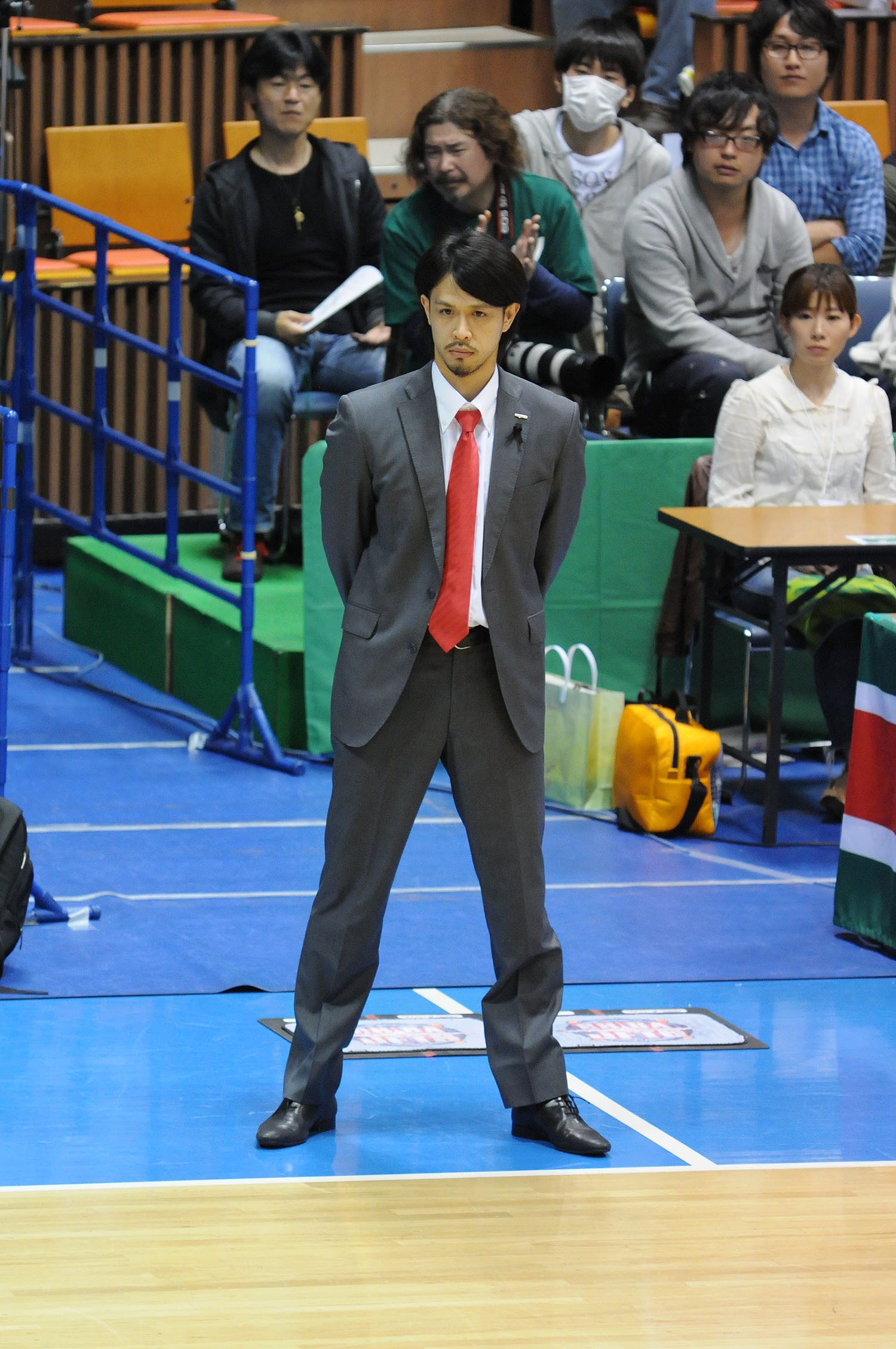

Chiba Jets Funabashi
- Position: General manager
- League: B.League

Personal information
- Born: January 30, 1982 (age 44) Yotsukaido, Chiba

Career information
- High school: Yachiyo (Yachiyo, Chiba)
- College: Juntendo University
- Playing career: 2004–2015

Career history

Playing
- 2004-2005: Otsuka Corporation Alphas
- 2005-2011: Oita Heat Devils
- 2011-2015: Chiba Jets

Coaching
- 2016: Chiba Jets

Hiroki Sato (佐藤博紀, Sato Hiroki) is a Japanese professional basketball executive and former player, currently serving as the general manager of the Chiba Jets Funabashi of the Japanese B.League. He played college basketball for Juntendo University. He was selected by the Oita Heat Devils with the 11th overall pick in the 2005 bj League draft. Sato's jersey number has been retired by the Jets.

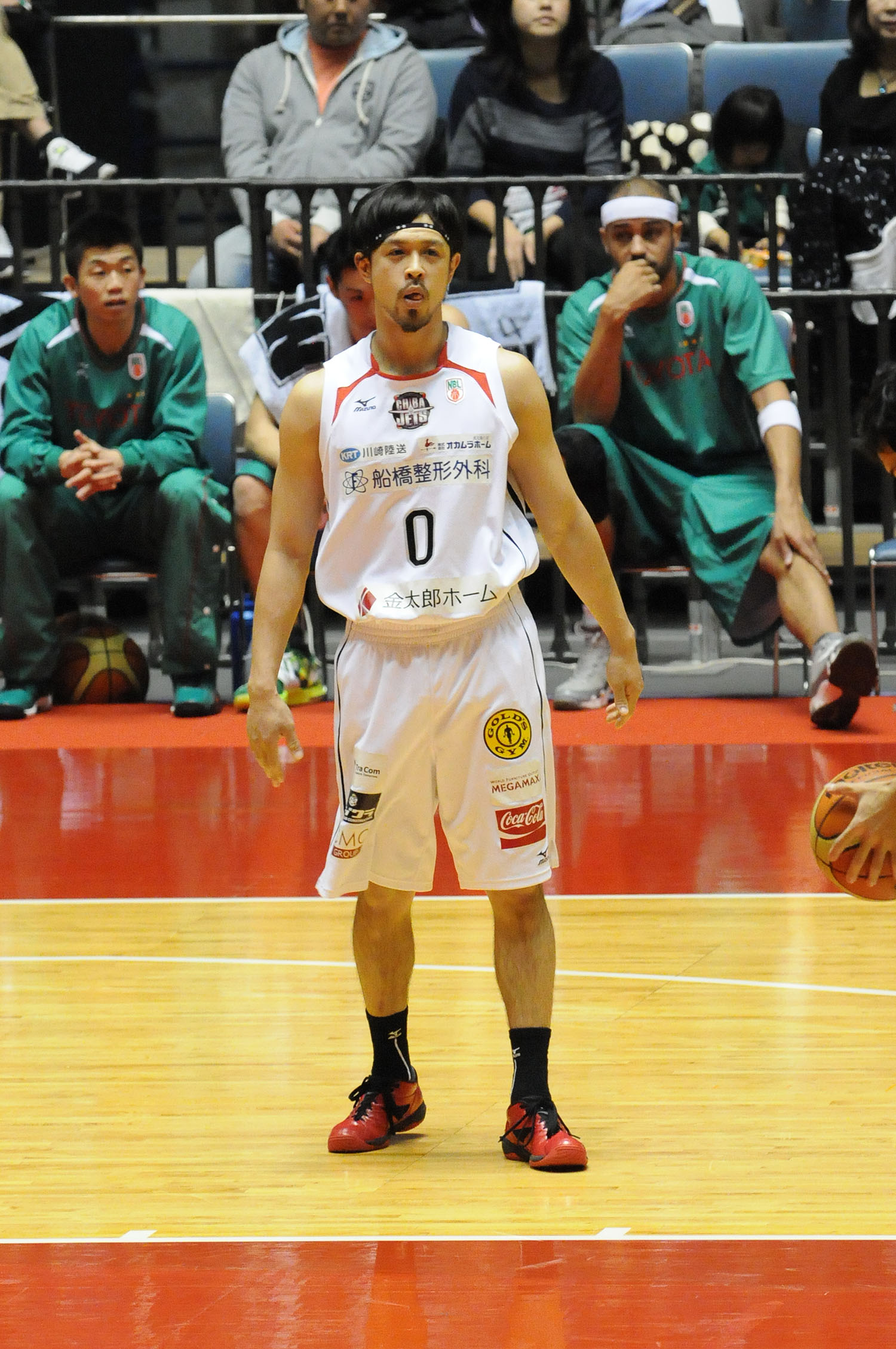
Sato with Jets

== Head coaching record ==
Legend
Regular season	G	Games coached	W	Games won	L	Games lost	W–L %	Win–loss %
Playoffs	PG	Playoff games	PW	Playoff wins	PL	Playoff losses	PW–L %	Playoff win–loss %

Team	Year	G	W	L	W–L%	Finish	PG	PW	PL	PW–L%	Result
Chiba Jets	2016	21	9	12	.429	8th in NBL	-	-	-	–	-
