= Atsushi Ōno =

Japanese basketball player and coach

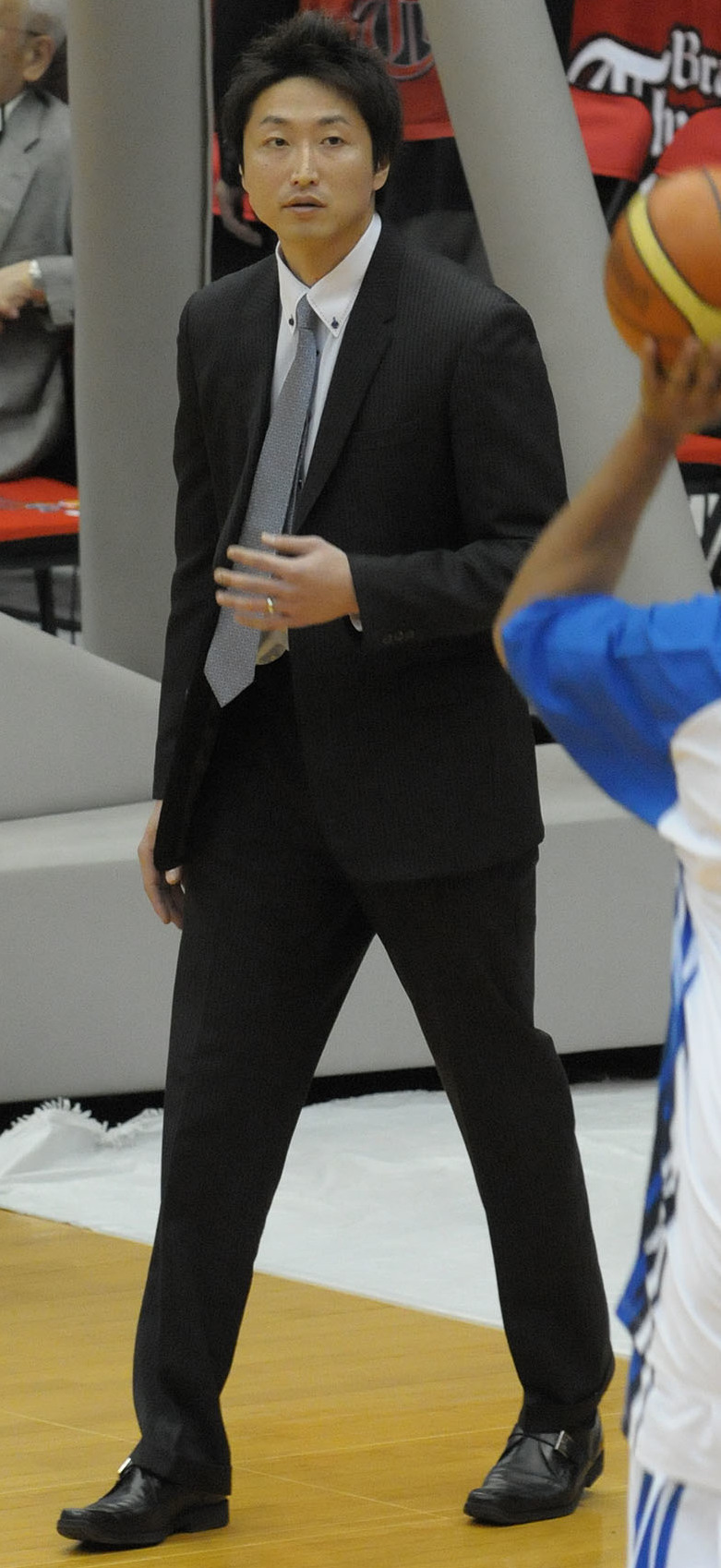

San-en NeoPhoenix
- Position: Head coach
- League: B.League

Personal information
- Born: August 12, 1977 (age 49) Nonoichi, Ishikawa

Career information
- High school: Aichi Institute of Technology Meiden (Nagoya, Aichi)
- College: Nippon Sport Science University
- Playing career: 2000–2010

Career history

Playing
- 2000-2007: Mitsubishi Electric
- 2007-2010: Panasonic Trians

Coaching
- 2010-2012: Panasonic Trians (asst.)
- 2013: Panasonic Trians
- 2014-2016: Hiroshima Dragonflies (asst)
- 2016-2022: Chiba Jets
- 2022-present: San-en NeoPhoenix

Career highlights
- JBL Rookie of the Year(2000-01)
Medals
Representing Japan
William Jones Cup
Bronze medal – third place	2002 Taipei	Team

Atsushi Ono (大野 篤史, Ōno Atsushi) is the Head coach of the San-en NeoPhoenix in the Japanese B.League.

== Career statistics ==
Legend
GP	Games played	GS	Games started	MPG	Minutes per game
FG%	Field goal percentage	3P%	3-point field goal percentage	FT%	Free throw percentage
RPG	Rebounds per game	APG	Assists per game	SPG	Steals per game
BPG	Blocks per game	PPG	Points per game	**Bold**	Career high

Year	Team	GP	GS	MPG	FG%	3P%	FT%	RPG	APG	SPG	BPG	PPG
2007-11	Panasonic	104		16.7	.371	.350	.692	1.5	1.0	0.2	0.1	5.1

== Head coaching record ==
Legend
Regular season	G	Games coached	W	Games won	L	Games lost	W–L %	Win–loss %
Playoffs	PG	Playoff games	PW	Playoff wins	PL	Playoff losses	PW–L %	Playoff win–loss %

Team	Year	G	W	L	W–L%	Finish	PG	PW	PL	PW–L%	Result
Panasonic Trians	2012-13	6	-	-	–	-	-	-	-	–	-
Chiba Jets	2016-17	60	44	16	.733	3rd in Eastern	2	0	2	.000	Lost in 1st round
Chiba Jets Funabashi	2017-18	60	46	14	.767	1st in Eastern	6	4	2	.667	Runners-up
Chiba Jets Funabashi	2018-19	60	52	8	.867	1st in Eastern	5	4	1	.800	Runners-up
Chiba Jets Funabashi	2019-20	40	28	12	.700	3rd in Eastern	-	-	-	–	-
