= Chiba Jets =

Japanese professional basketball team

Chiba Jets Funabashi
- Leagues: B.LEAGUE PREMIER
- Founded: 2005; 21 years ago
- History: Chiba Jets (2005–2017); Chiba Jets Funabashi (2017–present)
- Arena: LaLa Arena Tokyo-Bay
- Capacity: 11,000
- Location: Funabashi, Chiba
- Team colors
- Main sponsor: Kintaro Home
- Team manager: Yuta Ikeuchi
- Head coach: Kovács Adrián
- Ownership: Mixi
- Championships: 1 B.League; 5 Emperor's Cup; 2 East Asia Super League
- Conference titles: 4 B.League Eastern Conference
- Retired numbers: 2 (0)(11)
- Website: Official site
| Home | Away |

Chiba Jets Funabashi (千葉ジェッツふなばし, Chiba Jettsu Funabashi), more commonly known as the Chiba Jets, are a Japanese professional basketball team based in Funabashi, Chiba Prefecture. Owned by Mixi, the team competes in the B.League Premier, the highest division of the B.League, as a member of the Eastern Conference. The team plays its home games at LaLa Arena Tokyo-Bay.

The Jets also won the East Asia Super League (EASL) in 2024, and an exhibition season title in 2017. The 2024 championship was won behind season MVP Yuki Togashi, who scored 20 points in the final against Seoul SK Knights. They have also won five Emperor's Cups.

== Arenas ==
The Jets currently play in the Funabashi Arena in Funabashi, but are expected to move to the Arena Tokyo Bay, which is scheduled to open in spring 2024.

== Honours ==
=== Domestic ===
- B.League
  - Champions (1): 2020–21
  - Runner-up (3): 2017–18, 2018–19, 2022–23
  - Conference Champions (4): 2017–18, 2018–19, 2021–22 ,2022–23
- Emperor's Cup
  - Champions (5): 2017, 2018, 2019, 2023, 2024
  - Runner-up (1): 2022

=== Continental ===
- East Asia Super League
  - Champions (1): 2023–24
  - Super 8 Winners (1): 2017

== Season by season ==
| Season | Tier | League | Regular season | Position after playoffs | Emperor's Cup | East Asia Super League |
|---|---|---|---|---|---|---|
| 2016–17 | 1 | B1 | 3rd | Quarterfinal | Champions | - |
| 2017–18 | 1 | B1 | 1st | Runner-up | Champions | Super 8 Winners |
| 2018–19 | 1 | B1 | 1st | Runner-up | Champions | - |
| 2019–20 | 1 | B1 | 3rd | Canceled due to the COVID-19 pandemic | Round of 16 | - |
| 2020–21 | 1 | B1 | 2nd | Champions | Quarterfinal | - |
| 2021–22 | 1 | B1 | 1st | Quarterfinal | Runner-up | - |
| 2022–23 | 1 | B1 | 1st | Runner-up | Champions | - |
| 2023–24 | 1 | B1 | 3rd | Semifinal | Champions | Champions |
| 2024–25 | 1 | B1 | 2nd | Semifinal | Quarterfinal | - |
| 2025–26 | 1 | B1 | 2nd | Semifinal | Quarterfinal | - |

== Roster ==
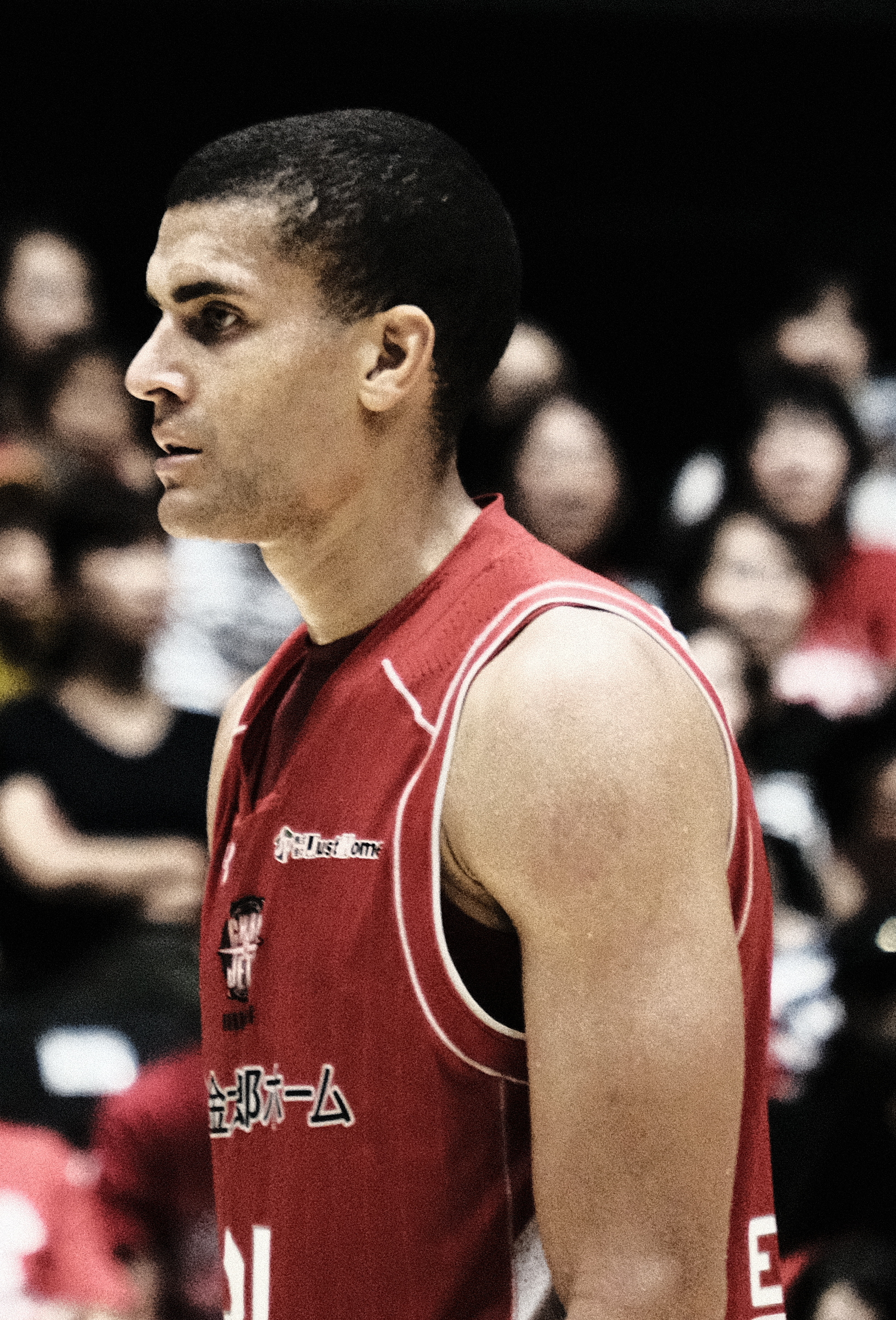
Gavin Edwards

Note: Flags indicate national team eligibility at FIBA-sanctioned events. Players may hold other non-FIBA nationalities not displayed.

Chiba Jets Funabashi roster
Players
Coaches

| Pos. | No. | Nat. | Name | Ht. | Age |
|---|---|---|---|---|---|
| F | 1 | (Japan) | Yuta Watanabe (C) | 2.06 m (6 ft 9 in) | 32 – 13 October 1994 |
| G | 2 | (Japan) | Yuki Togashi | 1.67 m (5 ft 6 in) | 33 – 30 July 1993 |
| G/F | 4 | (Japan) | Naoki Tashiro (C) | 1.88 m (6 ft 2 in) | 33 – 24 June 1993 |
| PG | 5 | (Japan) | Riku Segawa | 1.84 m (6 ft 0 in) | 20 – 14 August 2006 |
| SG | 6 | (Japan) | Bruce Kanno | 2.00 m (6 ft 7 in) | 23 – 6 May 2003 |
| SG | 8 | (United States) | Brandon Randolph | 1.98 m (6 ft 6 in) | 29 – 2 September 1997 |
| SF | 12 | (Japan) | Ren Kanechika | 1.96 m (6 ft 5 in) | 23 – 11 March 2003 |
| SF | 13 | (Japan) | Kotaro Fukami | 1.87 m (6 ft 2 in) | 18 – 25 August 2008 |
| SF | 17 | (Japan) | Takumi Sato | 1.98 m (6 ft 6 in) | 24 – 18 December 2001 |
| SF | 19 | (United States) | Nate Williams (injured) | 1.96 m (6 ft 5 in) | 27 – 12 February 1999 |
| C | 22 | (Japan) | Nyika Williams | 2.03 m (6 ft 8 in) | 39 – 9 July 1987 |
| F/C | 24 | (United States) | Matt Costello (C) | 2.08 m (6 ft 10 in) | 33 – 5 August 1993 |
| F | 25 | (Japan) | Gaku Arao | 1.98 m (6 ft 6 in) | 39 – 15 January 1987 |
| SF | 28 | (Japan) | Kai Sugawara | 1.91 m (6 ft 3 in) | 23 – 28 February 2003 |
| G/F | 31 | (Japan) | Shuta Hara | 1.87 m (6 ft 2 in) | 32 – 17 December 1993 |
| PF | 32 | (United States) | Luke Maye | 2.03 m (6 ft 8 in) | 29 – 7 March 1997 |

Head coach

- (Hungary) Adrián Kovács

Assistant coach(es)

- (Japan) Shinya Ogawa
- (Japan) Miguel Zapata
- (Japan) Atsushi Inagaki

Legend

- (C) Team captain
- Injured

- Roster
Updated: 10 October 2026

== Individual awards ==
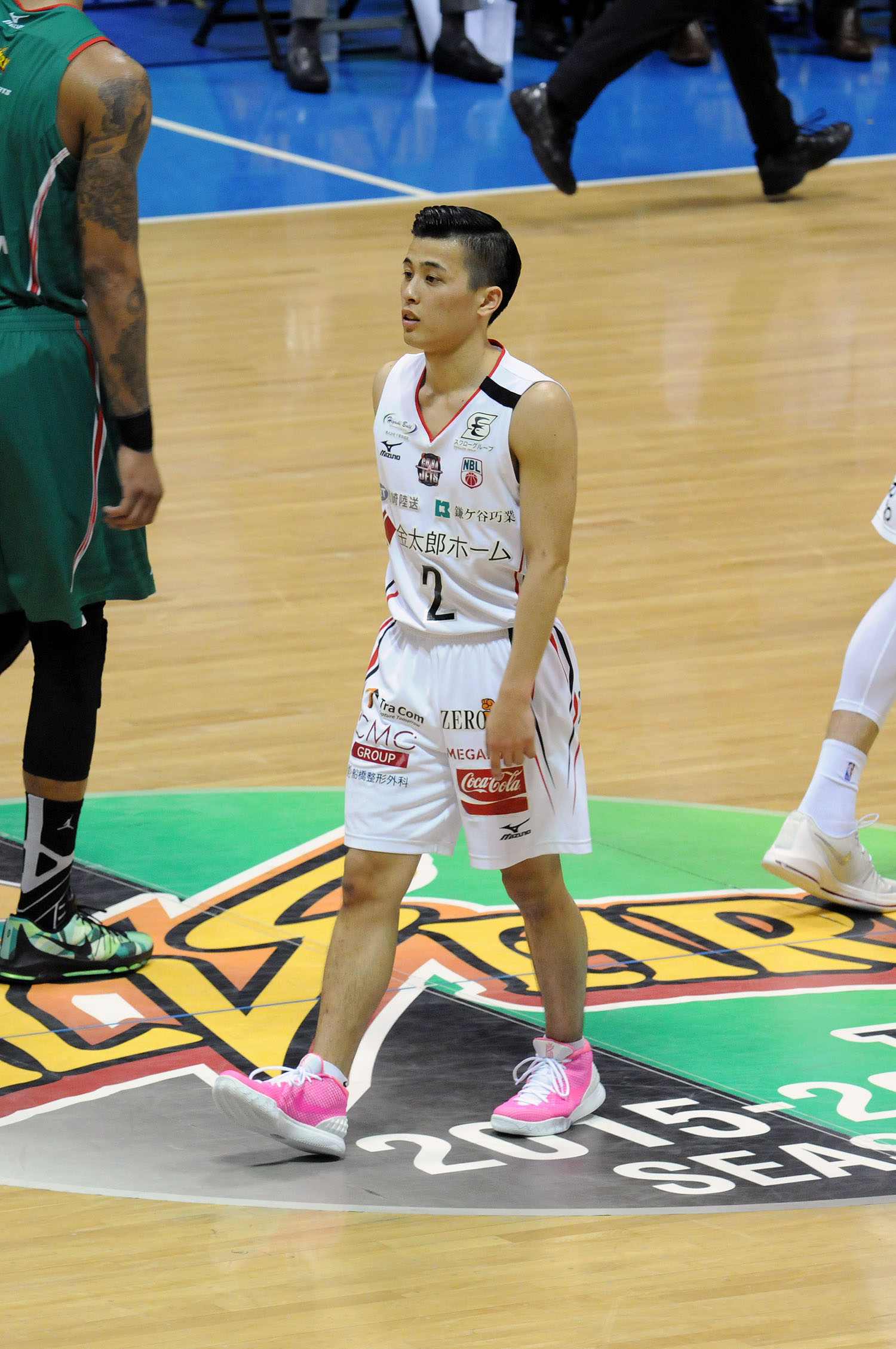
Yuki Togashi

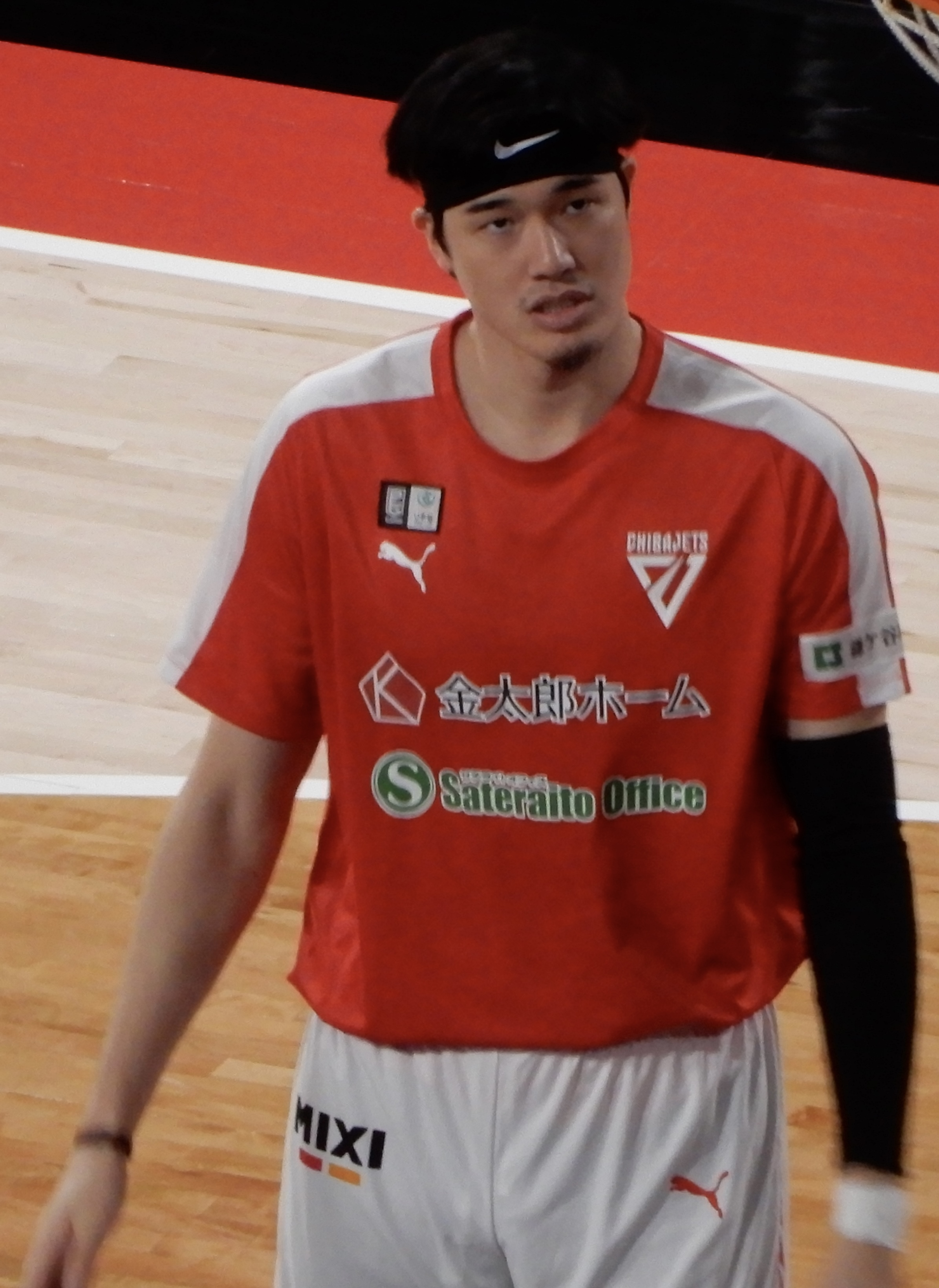
Yuta Watanabe

- East Asia Super League Final MVP
  - Yuki Togashi (2024)
- East Asia Super League Best Five
  - Yuki Togashi (2024)
  - John Mooney (2024)
- League Final MVP
  - Sebas Saiz (2021)
- League MVP
  - Yuki Togashi (2019)
- League Best Five
  - Yuki Togashi (2017,2018,2019,2020,2021,2022,2023,2024)
  - Shuta Hara (2023)
  - Christopher Smith (2023)
- League 2nd TEAM
  - John Mooney (2024)
  - Yuki Togashi (2025)
- League Best 6th Man
  - Christopher Smith (2022,2023)
  - Tyler Stone (2017)
- Defensive Player of the Year
  - Shuta Hara (2023,2025)
- League Assist leader
  - Yuki Togashi (2020,2022)
- League Rebound leader
  - John Mooney (2024)
- League Steal leader
  - Michael Parker (2018)
- League 3point pct leader
  - Kosuke Ishii (2019)
- League Rookie of the Year
  - Ren Kanechika (2024)
- League MIP
  - Riku Segawa (2025)
- League Coach of the Year
  - Atsushi Ōno (2021)
- Emperor's Cup MVP
  - Yuki Togashi (2019,2023,2024)

== Notable players ==
To appear in this section a player must have either:

- Set a club record or won an individual award as a professional player.
- Played at least one official international match for his senior national team.

- (Cameroon) Serge Angounou
- (Japan) Gaku Arao
- (United States) Hilton Armstrong
- (United States) Marquin Chandler
- (United States) Brian Cook
- (United States) Gavin Edwards
- (Senegal) Pape Faye
- (United States) Tony Gaffney
- (Japan) Reina Itakura
- (Japan) Shunsuke Itō
- (United States) DeQuan Jones
- (United States) George Leach
- (United States) Leo Lyons
- (Japan) Yusuke Okada
- (Japan) Ryumo Ono
- (United States) Rick Rickert
- (United States) Clint Chapman
- (United States) Tyler Stone
- (Japan) Yuki Togashi
- (United States) Alan Wiggins
- (United States) Trey McKinney-Jones
- (Spain) Sebas Saiz
- (United States) Shannon Shorter
- (United States) Josh Duncan
- (United States) John Mooney
- (United States) Christopher Smith
- (United States) Vic Law
- (Japan) Ira Brown
- (United States) D. J. Stephens
- (Australia) Xavier Cooks
- (Japan) Yuta Watanabe
- (United States) Nassir Little
- (United States) D. J. Hogg
- (United States) Garrison Brooks
- (Philippines) Quentin Millora-Brown

== Coaches ==
- (United States) Eric Gardow（2011-12）
- (Japan) Shinji Tomiyama（2012-13）
- (United States) Reggie Geary（2013-15）
- (Croatia) Željko Pavličević（2015-2016.3）
  - (Japan) Hiroki Sato（acting、2016）
- (Japan) Atsushi Ono（2016-22）
- (United States) John Patrick（2022-24）
- (Australia) Trevor Gleeson（2024-2026）
- (Hungary) Kovács Adrián（2026-）

== Arenas ==
- LaLa arena TOKYO-BAY
- Funabashi Arena
- Chiba Port Arena

== Practice facilities ==
They practice at the 「ROCK ICE BASE」 in Yachiyo.
