= Yuki Togashi =

Japanese basketball player (born 1993)

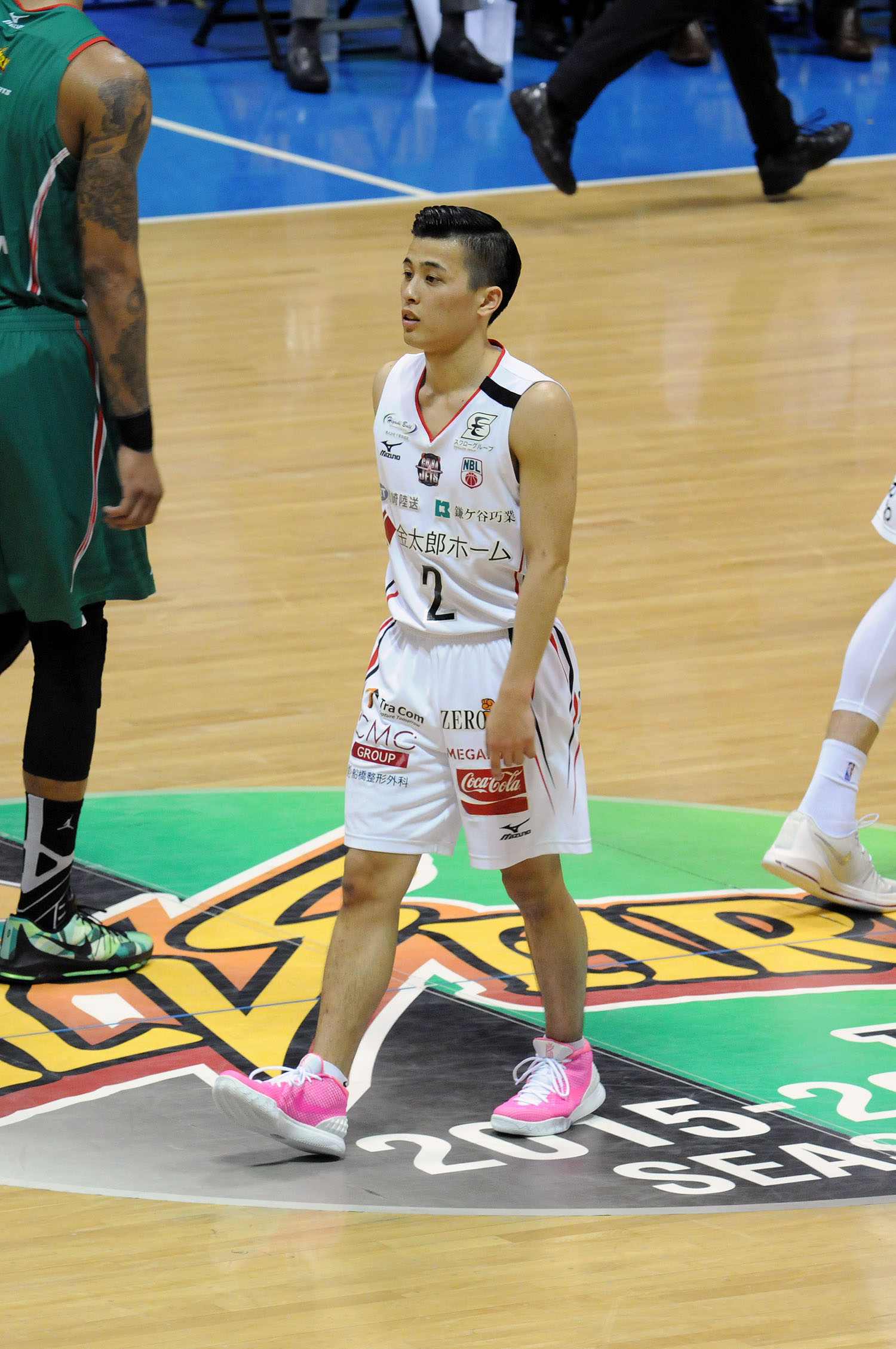

No. 2 – Chiba Jets Funabashi
- Position: Point guard
- League: B.League

Personal information
- Born: 30 July 1993 (age 33) Shibata, Niigata, Japan
- Listed height: 5 ft 6 in (1.68 m)
- Listed weight: 150 lb (68 kg)

Career information
- High school: Montrose Christian (Rockville, Maryland)
- NBA draft: 2014: undrafted
- Playing career: 2013–present

Career history
- 2013–2014: Akita Northern Happinets
- 2014–2015: Texas Legends
- 2015–present: Chiba Jets

Career highlights
- East Asia Super League Final MVP (2024); B.League MVP (2019); B.League Best Five (2017 - 2023); B.League All-Star Game MVP (2017); B.League Assist leader (2020,2022); Emperor's Cup MVP (2019,2023,2024); bj league Best Five Team (2014); bj league All-Star Game MVP (2014)
- Stats at Basketball Reference
Medals
Men's basketball
Representing Japan
Asian Games
Bronze medal – third place	2014 South Korea	Team competition

Yuki Togashi (富樫 勇樹, Togashi Yūki; born 30 July 1993) is a Japanese professional basketball player for the Chiba Jets Funabashi of the B.League in Japan.

== Early life ==
Born in Shibata, Niigata, Togashi moved to the United States in 2009 where he attended Montrose Christian School in Rockville, Maryland. During his three-year career at Montrose, he played on the Mustangs' nationally ranked teams including the 2011 squad that captured the ESPN RISE National High School Invitational (NHSI) with a double-overtime victory against Oak Hill Academy. He graduated in 2012, and after not receiving any NCAA Division I scholarship offers, he returned to Japan.

== Professional career ==
=== Japan ===
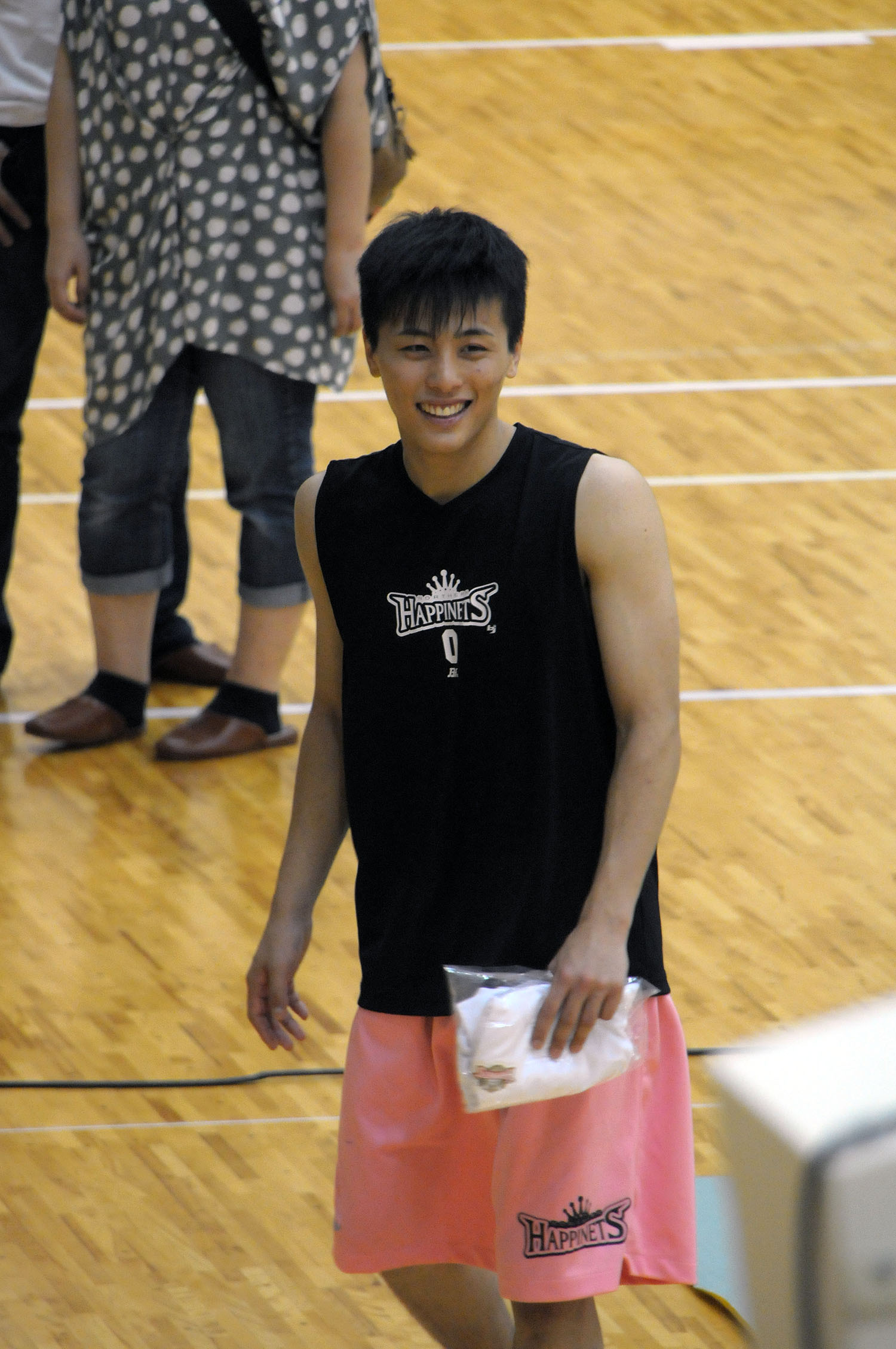
Akita years

In January 2013, Togashi signed with the Akita Northern Happinets of the bj league. In his debut game on 2 February 2013, he recorded 15 points, 11 assists, 3 rebounds and 3 steals in a win over the Toyama Grouses. He went on to play 30 games for the Happinets in the second half of the 2012–13 season, averaging 14.5 points, 6.2 assists, 2.9 rebounds and 1.2 steals in 37.2 minutes per game.

Togashi re-joined the Akita Northern Happinets for the 2013–14 season where he managed his first full professional season. In 58 games, he averaged 16.3 points, 7.6 assists, 2.9 rebounds and 1.1 steals in 36.8 minutes per game. He subsequently became the youngest player to be named to the bj league's Best Five Team, and was named the MVP of the league's All-Star game, held in January 2014.

=== NBA and D-League ===
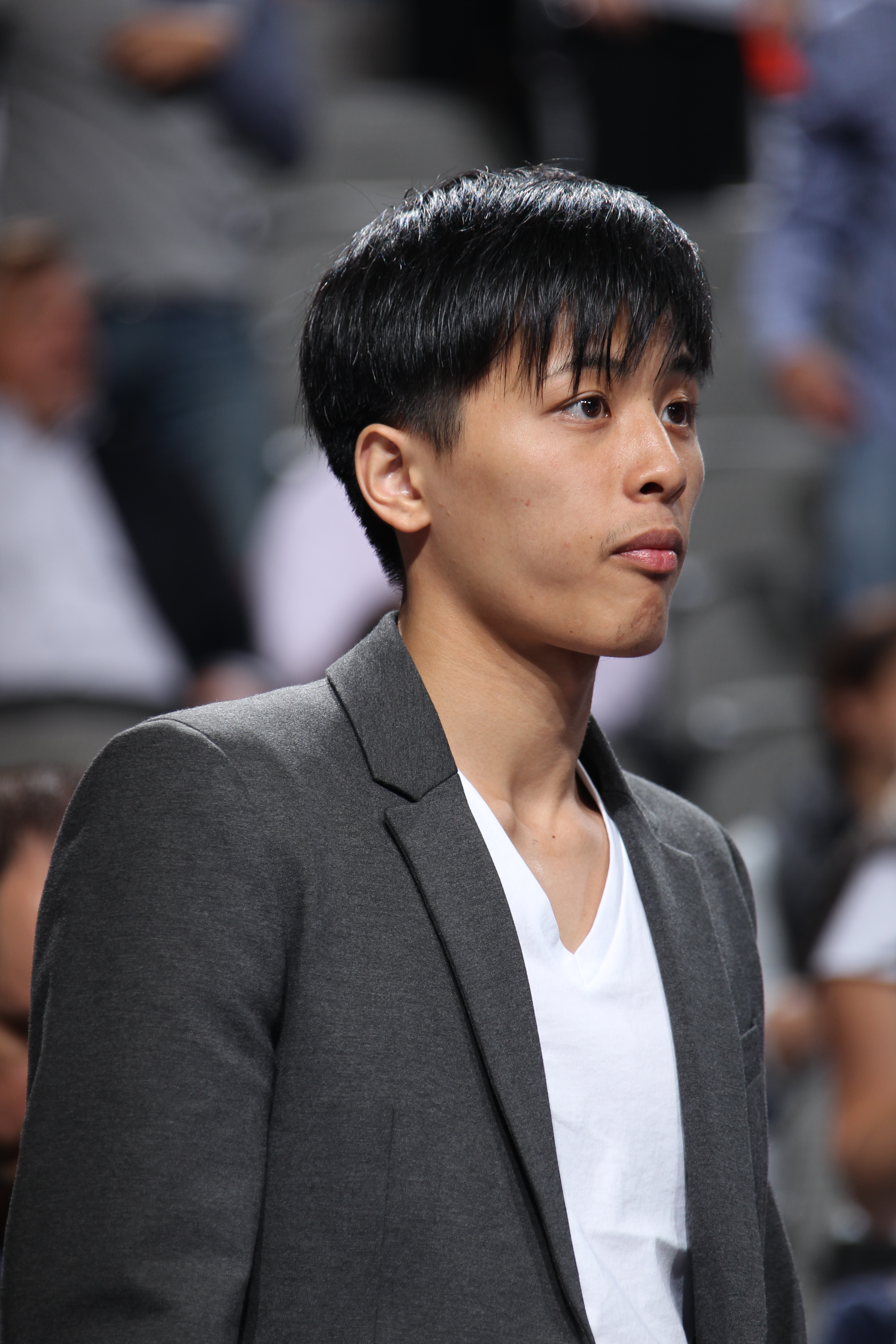
Dallas, USA

In July 2014, Togashi joined the Dallas Mavericks for the 2014 NBA Summer League where he was the shortest player in the competition and subsequently became a fan favorite. In four summer league games, he averaged 4.0 points and 1.5 rebounds in 9.3 minutes per game. On 15 October 2014, he signed with the Mavericks, only to be waived by the team six days later.

On 1 November 2014, Togashi was selected in the second round of the 2014 NBA Development League Draft by the Santa Cruz Warriors. He was later traded to the Texas Legends on draft night, the Mavericks' D-League affiliate team. He officially joined the Legends on 20 November 2014, and made his debut the following day, playing four minutes and recording one steal in a loss to the Santa Cruz Warriors. On 20 February 2015, Togashi suffered a left ankle injury which later ruled him out for the rest of the season. A month later, he was waived by the Legends. In 25 games for the Legends, he averaged two points and one assist in 8.3 minutes per game.

=== Italy ===
On 12 August 2015, Togashi signed a try-out contract with Italian Serie A side Dinamo Banco di Sardegna Sassari. He later parted ways with Sassari on 20 September 2015 before appearing in a game for them.

=== Return to Japan ===
On 9 October 2015, Togashi signed with the Chiba Jets of the Japanese National Basketball League.

On 15 May 2019, Togashi was named B.League MVP for the 2018–19 season.

== International career ==
In 2014, Togashi was a member of the Japanese national team that competed in the William Jones Cup and the Asian Games, winning bronze in the latter tournament.

== Career statistics ==
Legend
GP	Games played	GS	Games started	MPG	Minutes per game
FG%	Field goal percentage	3P%	3-point field goal percentage	FT%	Free throw percentage
RPG	Rebounds per game	APG	Assists per game	SPG	Steals per game
BPG	Blocks per game	PPG	Points per game	**Bold**	Career high

*	Led the league

=== Regular season ===
Year	Team	GP	GS	MPG	FG%	3P%	FT%	RPG	APG	SPG	BPG	PPG
2012–13	Akita	26	23	**36.7**	.411	.371	.556	**2.9**	6.1	**1.2**	**0.1**	14.3
2013–14	Akita	52	52	36.4	.399	.351	.833	**2.9**	**7.9***	1.1	0.1	15.6
2014–15	TEX	25	1	8.3	.429	**.455**	.667	0.4	1.0	0.2	0.0	2.0
2015–16	Chiba	43	5	16.6	.389	.394	.722	1.0	2.0	0.6	0.0	5.2
2016–17	Chiba	**60**	**60**	29.4	.391	.354	**.881**	2.4	4.0	0.8	0.0	13.2
2017–18	Chiba	50	46	27.8	**.474**	.418	.838	1.9	5.3	0.9	0.0	**15.7**
2018–19	Chiba	60	60	25.31	.426	.377	.778	1.9	5.5	0.7	0.0	14.0
2019–20	Chiba	40	35	27.0	.407	.344	.851	2.3	6.5*	0.7	0.0	14.4

=== Playoffs ===
Year	Team	GP	GS	MPG	FG%	3P%	FT%	RPG	APG	SPG	BPG	PPG
2013–14	Akita	6	6	31.17	.544	.500	.800	2.33	6.17	0.5	0.17	21.33
2016–17	Chiba	2	2	33.46	.296	.000	.833	1.5	6.0	1.5	0.0	10.5
2017–18	Chiba	6	6	26.24	.291	.214	.857	1.2	5.5	1.17	0	7.3
2018–19	Chiba	5	5	28.31	.493	.421	.500	2.6	8.4	1.0	0	17.6

=== All-star games ===
Year	Team	GP	GS	MPG	FG%	3P%	FT%	RPG	APG	SPG	BPG	PPG
2019	B.White	1	1	18.55	.385	.400	.000	0.0	5.0	3.0	0	12.0

=== Early cup games ===
Year	Team	GP	GS	MPG	FG%	3P%	FT%	RPG	APG	SPG	BPG	PPG
2017	Chiba	3	3	23.52	.425	.308	.625	1.3	3.3	1.0	0	14.3
2019	Chiba	2	2	23:06	.278	.000	1.000	2.5	5.5	1.5	0	8.5
