= 2021–22 T1 League season =

1st T1 League season

- League: T1 League
- Sport: Basketball
- Duration: November 27, 2021 – May 20, 2022 (regular season); May 22, 2022 (play-in); May 24 – 28, 2022 (semifinals); May 31 – June 4, 2022 (finals)
- Games: 30 per team
- Teams: 6
- TV partner(s): Eleven Sports, ELTA TV

Draft
- Top draft pick: No picking order in this draft

Regular season
- Top seed: Kaohsiung Aquas
- Season MVP: Chiang Yu-An (HeroBears)
- Top scorer: Diamond Stone (HeroBears)

Playoffs

Finals
- Champions: Kaohsiung Aquas
- Runners-up: Taichung Wagor Suns
- Finals MVP: Hu Long-Mao (Aquas)

T1 League seasons
- 2022–23 →

The 2021–22 T1 League season was the first season of the T1 League, with the Kaohsiung Aquas, New Taipei CTBC DEA, Taichung Wagor Suns, Tainan TSG GhostHawks, TaiwanBeer HeroBears, and the Taoyuan Leopards participating in this competition. The regular season started on November 27, 2021 and ended on May 20, 2022. The play-in series was played on May 22. The semifinals series started on May 24 and ended on May 28. The finals series started on May 31 and ended on June 4. On June 4, the Kaohsiung Aquas defeated the Taichung Wagor Suns, 3–0, winning the 2021–22 season championship.

== Teams ==
Team	Chinese name	Location	Arena	Map
Kaohsiung Aquas	高雄全家海神	Kaohsiung City	Kaohsiung Arena; Fengshan Arena (Note: Home games of the playoffs.)	2021–22 T1 League season is located in Taiwan
New Taipei CTBC DEA	新北中信特攻	New Taipei City	Xinzhuang Gymnasium	2021–22 T1 League season is located in Taiwan
Taichung Wagor Suns	臺中葳格太陽	Taichung City	National Taiwan University of Sport Gymnasium	2021–22 T1 League season is located in Taiwan
Tainan TSG GhostHawks	臺南台鋼獵鷹	Tainan City	Chia Nan University of Pharmacy and Science Shao Tsung Gymnasium	2021–22 T1 League season is located in Taiwan
TaiwanBeer HeroBears	台灣啤酒英熊	Taipei City	University of Taipei Tianmu Campus Gymnasium; Taipei Heping Basketball Gymnasium (Note: Home games of the February 19 and 20, 2022.)	2021–22 T1 League season is located in Taiwan
Taoyuan Leopards	桃園雲豹	Taoyuan City	Chung Yuan Christian University Gymnasium; Taipei Heping Basketball Gymnasium (Note: Home games of the April 23 and 24, 2022.); Taoyuan Arena (Note: Home games of the May 18 to 20, 2022 and play-in.)	2021–22 T1 League season is located in Taiwan

== Season format ==
- Each team plays against another six times, three at home and three on the road, respectively. Each team plays 30 matches total in the regular season.
- Play-in series: Best-of-three series. The series are contested by the teams that finished the regular season as the fourth seed and fifth seed. The fourth seed is awarded a one-win advantage. The winner can qualify to the semifinals series.
- Semifinals series: Best-of-five series. Matchup is decided by seeding in regular season. The first seed plays against the winner of play-in series. The second seed plays against the third seed. The winners can qualify for the finals series. Due to the COVID-19 pandemic in Taiwan, the semifinals series change to best-of-three series.
- Finals series: Best-of-seven series. The series are contested by the winners of semifinals series. Due to the COVID-19 pandemic in Taiwan, the finals series change to best-of-five series.

== Import players restrictions ==
- Each team is able to register up to 4 general import players and 2 type-III players.
- Each team is able to select 3 general import players and 1 type-III player into active roster in each match.
- The maximum of import players on the court is two.
- 10-imports-in-4-quarters rule: two quarters can have 2 import players and 1 type-III player on the court, and other two quarters can have 2 import players or 1 import player and 1 type-III player on the court.
- Type-III player eligibility:
1. Naturalized players
2. Asian import players (Note: In the 2021–22 season, the T1 League allowed players from Brunei, Cambodia, Hong Kong, Indonesia, Japan, Laos, Macao, Malaysia, Myanmar, the Philippines, Singapore, South Korea, Thailand, and Vietnam to play as Asian import players.)
3. Foreign students
4. Overseas compatriots

== Import and type-III players ==
Team	Import players	Type-III players	Former import / type-III players
Kaohsiung Aquas	(United States) Xavier Alexander (United States) Ferrakohn Hall (Lithuania) Mindaugas Kupšas (Canada) Negus Webster-Chan	(Philippines) (United States) Jason Brickman	—N/a
New Taipei CTBC DEA	(United States) Marlon Johnson (United States) Aaron Epps (United States) Kevin Allen	(Philippines) (United States) Avery Scharer	(United States) (Rwanda) Prince Ibeh (Thailand) Chanatip Jakrawan (III) (United States) Cleanthony Early
Taichung Wagor Suns	(Palestine) Sani Sakakini (United States) Julian Wright (United States) Anthony Tucker (United Kingdom) (Iran) Aaron Geramipoor	(Philippines) (Australia) Jordan Heading (Philippines) Niño Canaleta	(United States) Alonzo Gee
Tainan TSG GhostHawks	(Belize) (United States) Charles García (United States) Jordan Chatman (United States) Marcus Gilbert	(United States) (Taiwan) William Artino	(Canada) Negus Webster-Chan (I) → (III) (United States) King Revolution (Dominican Republic) (Indonesia) Lester Prosper
TaiwanBeer HeroBears	(United States) Diamond Stone (United States) Ronald Delph (Malta) (Italy) Samuel Deguara	(Thailand) (United States) Tyler Lamb	(United States) Tony Mitchell (United States) Doral Moore (United States) Ramon Galloway
Taoyuan Leopards	(United States) Deyonta Davis (United States) Troy Williams (United States) John Gillon (United States) Elijah Thomas	(Philippines) (United States) Caelan Tiongson	(United States) Daniel Orton (Serbia) Aleksandar Mitrović

(I): Import players
(III): Type-III players

== Transactions ==
=== Draft ===
The 2021 T1 League draft was held on August 9, 2021.

=== Coaching changes ===
Coaching assigns
Team	2021–22 season
Off-season
Kaohsiung Aquas	Brendan Joyce
New Taipei CTBC DEA	Lee Yi-Hua
Taichung Wagor Suns	Iurgi Caminos
Tainan TSG GhostHawks	Wu Chih-Wei
TaiwanBeer HeroBears	Yang Chih-Hao
Taoyuan Leopards	Wang Chih-Chun

Coaching changes
Team	Outgoing coach	Incoming coach
In-season
Tainan TSG GhostHawks	Wu Chih-Wei	Liu Meng-Chu (interim)
Taoyuan Leopards	Wang Chih-Chun	Su Yi-Chieh (interim)
Taoyuan Leopards	Su Yi-Chieh (interim)	Liu Chia-Fa

==== Off-season ====
- On July 30, 2021, the New Taipei CTBC DEA hired Lee Yi-Hua as their new head coach.
- On August 7, 2021, the Kaohsiung Aquas hired Brendan Joyce as their new head coach.
- On August 20, 2021, the Taoyuan Leopards hired Wang Chih-Chun as their new head coach.
- On September 16, 2021, the TaiwanBeer HeroBears hired Yang Chih-Hao as their new head coach.
- On September 29, 2021, the Taichung Wagor Suns hired Iurgi Caminos as their new head coach.
- On October 3, 2021, the Tainan TSG GhostHawks hired Wu Chih-Wei as their new head coach.

==== In-season ====
- On April 1, 2022, the Tainan TSG GhostHawks named Wu Chih-Wei as their team director, and Liu Meng-Chu, the Tainan TSG GhostHawks consultant, as their interim head coach.
- On April 10, 2022, the Taoyuan Leopards announced that Wang Chih-Chun resigned from head coach, and named Su Yi-Chieh, the Taoyuan Leopards general manager, as their interim head coach.
- On May 16, 2022, the Taoyuan Leopards announced Liu Chia-Fa, the Taoyuan Leopards skills consultant, as their new head coach.

== Preseason ==
The T1 League held the Kaohsiung Port preseason games at the Kaohsiung Arena on November 13 and 14, 2021.

=== Game log ===
November 13, 2021 Preseason #01	Taoyuan Leopards	87–97	Tainan TSG GhostHawks	Kaohsiung City
15:00 (UTC+8)	Scoring by quarter: 8–28, 18–19, 31–19, 30–31
	Pts: Wu Chi-Ying 25; Rebs: Tsai Yang-Ming 13; Asts: Cheng Wei, Yu Meng-Yun 6	boxscore	Pts: García 26; Rebs: García 14; Asts: Lin Tzu-Feng 8	Arena: Kaohsiung Arena; Attendance: 3,288

November 13, 2021 Preseason #02	TaiwanBeer HeroBears	88–74	Taichung Suns	Kaohsiung City
17:30 (UTC+8)	Scoring by quarter: 29–11, 17–14, 21–24, 21–25
	Pts: Huang Jhen 18; Rebs: Chou Po-Hsun 13; Asts: Chou Tzu-hua 6	boxscore	Pts: Ting Sheng-Ju 13; Rebs: Sun Szu-Yao 16; Asts: Ting Sheng-Ju 5	Arena: Kaohsiung Arena; Attendance: 3,288

November 14, 2021 Preseason #03	New Taipei CTBC DEA	101–86	Kaohsiung Aquas	Kaohsiung City
15:00 (UTC+8)	Scoring by quarter: 26–24, 20–24, 27–22, 28–16
	Pts: Bachir 32; Rebs: Morrison 12; Asts: Wei Chia-Hao 7	boxscore	Pts: Yu Huan-Ya 18; Rebs: Wu I-Ping 14; Asts: five players 3	Arena: Kaohsiung Arena; Attendance: 4,617

== Regular season ==
The regular season started on November 27, 2021 and ended on May 20, 2022. On November 27, the 2021–22 season opening game, matched by the Kaohsiung Aquas and the TaiwanBeer HeroBears, was played at University of Taipei Tianmu Campus Gymnasium.

=== League table ===
Pos	Team	Pld	W	L	PCT	GB	Qualification
1	Kaohsiung Aquas	30	23	7	.767	—	Advance to semifinals
2	Taichung Wagor Suns	30	20	10	.667	3	Advance to semifinals
3	New Taipei CTBC DEA	30	17	13	.567	6	Advance to semifinals
4	TaiwanBeer HeroBears	30	16	14	.533	7	Advance to play-in
5	Taoyuan Leopards	30	8	22	.267	15	Advance to play-in
6	Tainan TSG GhostHawks	30	6	24	.200	17	

Source: T1 League

=== Results ===
Home \ Away	HEROBEARS	DEA	LEOPARDS	SUNS	GHOSTHAWKS	AQUAS
TaiwanBeer HeroBears	—	94–115	102–93	117–111	110–113	106–107
TaiwanBeer HeroBears	—	118–116	115–113	95–115	109–122	131–125*
TaiwanBeer HeroBears	—	95–91	120–88	119–118*	144–115	107–124
New Taipei CTBC DEA	94–95*	—	85–77	92–99	108–81	69–87
New Taipei CTBC DEA	113–95	—	125–104	105–113	116–104	91–90
New Taipei CTBC DEA	135–127*	—	139–121	110–106	133–101	92–123
Taoyuan Leopards	101–96	72–85	—	115–119	83–114	82–116
Taoyuan Leopards	135–134	119–132	—	97–112	97–84	100–106
Taoyuan Leopards	110–104	136–124	—	125–127*	109–93	117–137
Taichung Wagor Suns	110–102	85–95	101–74	—	115–91	93–88
Taichung Wagor Suns	88–95	116–97	108–102	—	105–88	113–122*
Taichung Wagor Suns	84–91	109–99	98–93	—	126–101	81–98
Tainan TSG GhostHawks	83–102	97–115	81–89	95–98	—	95–126
Tainan TSG GhostHawks	105–114	88–102	132–113	85–112	—	77–102
Tainan TSG GhostHawks	110–99	103–119	99–118	111–119	—	91–76
Kaohsiung Aquas	114–113	108–67	133–116	92–81	96–83	—
Kaohsiung Aquas	94–100	93–76	111–84	89–104	103–93	—
Kaohsiung Aquas	92–99	100–98	119–104	87–71	100–81	—

Source: T1 League
Legend: Blue = home team win; Red = away team win.

=== Postponed games due to COVID-19 ===
- Two TaiwanBeer HeroBears home games (against the Tainan TSG GhostHawks on January 22, and against the Kaohsiung Aquas on January 23) were postponed to May 7 and 8 due to the COVID-19 pandemic preventive measures of Taipei City Government.
- Three Taoyuan Leopards home games (against the TaiwanBeer HeroBears on January 29, against the Kaohsiung Aquas on February 5, and against the Taichung Wagor Suns on February 6) were postponed to April 30, May 1 and April 29 due to the COVID-19 pandemic in Taiwan.
- Two Taoyuan Leopards home games (against the Tainan TSG GhostHawks on February 19, and against the Kaohsiung Aquas on February 20) were postponed to March 25 and 11 due to the COVID-19 pandemic in Taiwan.
- Two Taoyuan Leopards home games (against the New Taipei CTBC DEA on April 2, and against the Taichung Wagor Suns on April 3) were postponed to May 7 and 8 due to the COVID-19 pandemic in Taiwan.
- One Taoyuan Leopards home game (against the TaiwanBeer HeroBears on April 30) was postponed to May 6 due to the player of the TaiwanBeer HeroBears tested positive.
- Three Taoyuan Leopards home games (against the TaiwanBeer HeroBears on May 6, against the New Taipei CTBC DEA on May 7, and against the Taichung Wagor Suns on May 8) were postponed to May 19, 18 and 20 due to the Taoyuan Leopards could not reach the minimum player number.
- Two TaiwanBeer HeroBears home games (against the Tainan TSG GhostHawks on May 7, and against the Kaohsiung Aquas on May 8) were postponed to May 18 and 20 due to the TaiwanBeer HeroBears could not reach the minimum player number.

== Playoffs ==
- Play-in series: The fourth and fifth seeds play the best-of-three play-in series. The fourth seed will be awarded a one-win advantage. The winner can qualify the semifinals series.
- Semifinals series: The winner of play-in series and the top three seeds play the best-of-five semifinals series. The winners can qualify the finals series. Due to the COVID-19 pandemic in Taiwan, the semifinals series change to best-of-three series.
- Finals series: The winners of the semifinals series play the best-of-seven finals series. Due to the COVID-19 pandemic in Taiwan, the finals series change to best-of-five series.

=== Bracket ===
Play-in
4	**TaiwanBeer HeroBears**	**2**
5	Taoyuan Leopards	0

Semifinals
1	**Kaohsiung Aquas**	**2**
4	TaiwanBeer HeroBears	0
2	**Taichung Wagor Suns**	**2**
3	New Taipei CTBC DEA	1

Finals
1	**Kaohsiung Aquas**	**3**
2	Taichung Wagor Suns	0

Bold: Series winner
Italic: Team with home-court advantage

== Statistics ==
=== Individual statistic leaders ===
Category	Player	Team	Statistic
Points per game	Diamond Stone	TaiwanBeer HeroBears	27.5
Rebounds per game	William Artino	Tainan TSG GhostHawks	15.8
Assists per game	Jason Brickman	Kaohsiung Aquas	10.3
Steals per game	Lin Ping-Sheng	New Taipei CTBC DEA	3.0
Blocks per game	Deyonta Davis	Taoyuan Leopards	2.5
Turnovers per game	Troy Williams	Taoyuan Leopards	4.3
Fouls per game	Hu Long-Mao	Kaohsiung Aquas	3.7
Minutes per game	William Artino	Tainan TSG GhostHawks	42:00
2P%	Mindaugas Kupšas	Kaohsiung Aquas	63.0%
3P%	Yu Huan-Ya	Kaohsiung Aquas	42.7%
FT%	Ting Sheng-Ju	Taichung Wagor Suns	85.1%

=== Individual game highs ===
Category	Player	Team	Statistic
Points	Mohammad Al Bachir Gadiaga	New Taipei CTBC DEA	52
Points	Diamond Stone	TaiwanBeer HeroBears	52
Rebounds	Mindaugas Kupšas	Kaohsiung Aquas	30
Assists	Jason Brickman	Kaohsiung Aquas	21
Steals	Lin Ping-Sheng	New Taipei CTBC DEA	7
Steals	Anthony Tucker	Taichung Wagor Suns	7
Steals	Lester Prosper	Tainan TSG GhostHawks	7
Blocks	Deyonta Davis	Taoyuan Leopards	6
Turnovers	Troy Williams	Taoyuan Leopards	13
Three pointers	Jordan Heading	Taichung Wagor Suns	10

=== Team statistic leaders ===
Category	Team	Statistic
Points per game	TaiwanBeer HeroBears	108.3
Rebounds per game	Kaohsiung Aquas	48.5
Assists per game	Kaohsiung Aquas	25.4
Steals per game	New Taipei CTBC DEA	12.0
Blocks per game	Taoyuan Leopards	4.3
Turnovers per game	TaiwanBeer HeroBears	16.1
Fouls per game	Kaohsiung Aquas	22.7
2P%	Kaohsiung Aquas	53.4%
3P%	TaiwanBeer HeroBears	35.5%
FT%	TaiwanBeer HeroBears	76.9%

== Awards ==
=== Yearly awards ===
2021–22 T1 League awards
Award	Recipient	Team	Ref.
Most Valuable Player	Chiang Yu-An	TaiwanBeer HeroBears	
Most Valuable Import	Jason Brickman	Kaohsiung Aquas	
Most Famous Player of the Year	Wei Chia-Hao	New Taipei CTBC DEA	
Best Home-Court of the Year	New Taipei CTBC DEA		
Defensive Player of the Year	Lin Ping-Sheng	New Taipei CTBC DEA	
Rookie of the Year	Mohammad Al Bachir Gadiaga	New Taipei CTBC DEA	
Sixth Man of the Year	Anthony Tucker	Taichung Wagor Suns	
Coach of the Year	Brendan Joyce	Kaohsiung Aquas	
General Manager of the Year	Li Wei-Cheng	Kaohsiung Aquas	
Referees of the Year	Wu Chien-Wu		
Referees of the Year	Lin Chien-Hung		
Referees of the Year	Yu Jung		

- All-T1 League First Team:
  - Hu Long-Mao (Kaohsiung Aquas)
  - Jason Brickman (Kaohsiung Aquas)
  - Chiang Yu-An (TaiwanBeer HeroBears)
  - Sani Sakakini (Taichung Wagor Suns)
  - Mohammad Al Bachir Gadiaga (New Taipei CTBC DEA)
- All-Defensive First Team:
  - Chiang Yu-An (TaiwanBeer HeroBears)
  - Hu Long-Mao (Kaohsiung Aquas)
  - Lin Ping-Sheng (New Taipei CTBC DEA)
  - Mindaugas Kupšas (Kaohsiung Aquas)
  - Deyonta Davis (Taoyuan Leopards)

=== Statistical awards ===
2021–22 T1 League statistical awards
Award	Recipient	Team	Statistic	Ref.
Points Leader	Diamond Stone	TaiwanBeer HeroBears	27.5	
Rebounds Leader	William Artino	Tainan TSG GhostHawks	15.8	
Assists Leader	Jason Brickman	Kaohsiung Aquas	10.3	
Steals Leader	Lin Ping-Sheng	New Taipei CTBC DEA	3.0	
Blocks Leader	Deyonta Davis	Taoyuan Leopards	2.5	

=== Finals awards ===
2022 T1 League Finals awards
Award	Recipient	Team	Ref.
Champion	Kaohsiung Aquas		
Finals MVP	Hu Long-Mao	Kaohsiung Aquas	

=== MVP of the Month ===
MVP of the Month awards were only for local players.

Month	Recipient	Team	Ref.
2021
December	Chiang Yu-An	TaiwanBeer HeroBears	
2022
January	Mohammad Al Bachir Gadiaga	New Taipei CTBC DEA	
February	Chiang Yu-An	TaiwanBeer HeroBears	
March	Chen Ching-Huan	Taichung Wagor Suns	
April & May	Lin Ping-Sheng	New Taipei CTBC DEA	

=== Import of the Month ===
Import of the Month awards were only for import players and type-III players.

Month	Recipient	Team	Ref.
2021
December	Jason Brickman	Kaohsiung Aquas	
2022
January	Sani Sakakini	Taichung Wagor Suns	
February	Mindaugas Kupšas	Kaohsiung Aquas	
March	Sani Sakakini	Taichung Wagor Suns	
April & May	Troy Williams	Taoyuan Leopards	

== Arenas ==
- The Kaohsiung Aquas announced that they would play their home games at the Kaohsiung Arena on May 26, 2021.
- The Taichung Suns announced that they would play their home games at the National Taiwan University of Sport Gymnasium on June 19, 2021.
- The New Taipei CTBC DEA announced that they would play their home games at the Xinzhuang Gymnasium, and would share the same arena with the New Taipei Kings of the P. League+ on September 4, 2021.
- The TaiwanBeer HeroBears announced that they would play their home games at the University of Taipei Tianmu Campus Gymnasium on September 16, 2021. And they scheduled two of their home games at the Taipei Heping Basketball Gymnasium.
- The Taoyuan Leopards announced that they would play their home games at the Chung Yuan Christian University Gymnasium.
- The Tainan TSG GhostHawks announced that they would play their home games at the Chia Nan University of Pharmacy and Science Shao Tsung Gymnasium on November 15, 2021.
- The Kaohsiung Aquas announced that they would play their home games in playoffs at the Fengshan Arena on April 17, 2022.
- The Taoyuan Leopards announced that their home games on April 23 and 24, 2022 would change to Taipei Heping Basketball Gymnasium in Taipei City.
- The Taoyuan Leopards announced that their home games on May 18 to 20, 2022 would change to Taoyuan Arena.

== Media ==
- The games will be broadcast on television via Eleven Sports and ELTA TV, and online via 17LIVE.
- The games will be broadcast online via Twitch since 2022 and via Facebook since January 26.
- The games will be broadcast online via LINE TODAY since play-in series.

== Notable occurrences ==
- On May 26, 2021, the Kaohsiung Aquas was established formally to be the new team of the T1 League.
- On June 19, 2021, the Taichung Suns was established formally to be the new team of the T1 League.
- On July 30, 2021, the New Taipei CTBC DEA was established formally to be the new team of the T1 League.
- On August 4, 2021, the first trade (between Kaohsiung Aquas and New Taipei CTBC DEA) was made in T1 League history.
- On August 6, the T1 League announced that Chien Wei-Chuan was the commissioner of the league.
- On August 6, 2021, the Taoyuan Leopards and the Tainan team were established formally to be the new teams of the T1 League.
- On August 9, 2021, the first draft was held in T1 League history.
- On August 27, 2021, Cheng Wei of the Taoyuan Leopards became the first player to join four Taiwanese related basketball league (SBL, ABL, PLG, and T1).
- On September 2, 2021, the TaiwanBeer HeroBears was established formally to be the new team of the T1 League.
- On September 6, 2021, the T1 League announced that Chang Yun-Chih was the secretary general of the league.
- On September 30, 2021, the name of Tainan team was announced as the Tainan TSG GhostHawks.
- On November 27, 2021, the game matched by the Kaohsiung Aquas and the TaiwanBeer HeroBears became the first game in T1 League history.
- On December 4, 2021, the game matched by the TaiwanBeer HeroBears and the New Taipei CTBC DEA became the first overtime game in T1 League history.
- On December 11, 2021, Tony Mitchell of the TaiwanBeer HeroBears became the first player to record triple-double (with 24 points, 11 rebounds, and 10 assists) in T1 League history.
- On December 26, 2021, Yu Huan-Ya of the Kaohsiung Aquas recorded 300 three pointers in his career.
- On February 13, 2022, Yu Chun-An of the Kaohsiung Aquas recorded 1,000 points in his career.
- On March 16, 2022, Chou Tzu-Hua became the first player to involve the trade in T1 League history.
- On May 22, 2022, the game matched by the TaiwanBeer HeroBears and the Taoyuan Leopards became the first play-in game in T1 League history.
- On May 24, 2022, the game matched by the New Taipei CTBC DEA and the Taichung Wagor Suns became the first semifinals game in T1 League history.
- On May 31, 2022, the game matched by the Taichung Wagor Suns and the Kaohsiung Aquas became the first finals game in T1 League history.
- On June 4, 2022, the Kaohsiung Aquas became the first team to win the championship in T1 League history.

== See also ==
- 2021–22 Kaohsiung Aquas season
- 2021–22 New Taipei CTBC DEA season
- 2021–22 Taichung Wagor Suns season
- 2021–22 Tainan TSG GhostHawks season
- 2021–22 TaiwanBeer HeroBears season
- 2021–22 Taoyuan Leopards season
