= 2021–22 TaiwanBeer HeroBears season =

Taiwanese professional basketball season

- General Manager: Ha Hsiao-Yuan
- Head Coach: Yang Chih-Hao
- Arena: University of Taipei Tianmu Campus Gymnasium; Taipei Heping Basketball Gymnasium

T1 League results
- Record: 16–14 (53.3%)
- Place: 4th
- Playoffs finish: Semifinals (lost to Aquas, 0–2)

Player records
- Points: Diamond Stone 27.5
- Rebounds: Diamond Stone 11.5
- Assists: Chiang Yu-An 6.8

The 2021–22 TaiwanBeer HeroBears season was the franchise's first season, its first season in the T1 League.

The HeroBears were coached by Yang Chih-Hao in his first year as their head coach. On September 8, 2021, the HeroBears hired Ha Hsiao-Yuan as their general manager.

== Draft ==
The HeroBears did not select any players in the 2021 T1 League draft.

== Roster ==
2021–22 TaiwanBeer HeroBears roster
Players
Coaches

Pos.	No.	Nat.	Name	Ht.	Wt.	Age	From
SG	0	(Taiwan)	Huang Jhen	1.93 m (6 ft 4 in)	86 kg (190 lb)	31 – 27 June 1990	FJU
SF	1	(Thailand) (United States)	Tyler Lamb (AI)	1.96 m (6 ft 5 in)	94 kg (207 lb)	31 – 16 May 1991	Long Beach State
PG	8	(Taiwan)	Chien Chao-Yi	1.80 m (5 ft 11 in)	75 kg (165 lb)	28 – 12 July 1993	CCU
SG	11	(Taiwan)	Huang Tsung-Han	1.93 m (6 ft 4 in)	86 kg (190 lb)	27 – 7 July 1994	MDU
PG	14	(Taiwan)	Chiang Yu-An (C)	1.74 m (5 ft 9 in)	65 kg (143 lb)	30 – 4 August 1991	NTUS
C	15	(Taiwan)	Fan Shih-En	1.98 m (6 ft 6 in)	82 kg (181 lb)	27 – 1 June 1994	NTUST
PF	20	(Taiwan)	Chou Po-Hsun	1.97 m (6 ft 6 in)	85 kg (187 lb)	31 – 6 March 1991	MDU
C	21	(Malta) (Italy)	Samuel Deguara (I)	2.30 m (7 ft 7 in)	116 kg (256 lb)	30 – 21 June 1991	FIU
C	23	(United States)	Ronald Delph (I)	2.13 m (7 ft 0 in)	111 kg (245 lb)	29 – 29 March 1993	Florida Atlantic
SF	24	(Taiwan)	Chu I-Tsung	1.86 m (6 ft 1 in)	85 kg (187 lb)	35 – 4 August 1986	HWU
PF	27	(Taiwan)	Wang Hao-Chi	1.95 m (6 ft 5 in)	93 kg (205 lb)	32 – 22 September 1989	HWU
C	33	(United States)	Diamond Stone (I)	2.08 m (6 ft 10 in)	132 kg (291 lb)	25 – 10 February 1997	Maryland
SG	75	(Taiwan)	Lee Chi-Wei	1.92 m (6 ft 4 in)	87 kg (192 lb)	29 – 8 April 1993	MDU

Head coach

- (Taiwan) Yang Chih-Hao

Assistant coach(es)

- (Taiwan) Wang Jian-Wei
- (Taiwan) Lin Chieh-He

Athletic trainer(s)

- (Taiwan) Chien Shao-Fu

Team manager

- (Taiwan) Ha Hsiao-Yuan

Legend

- (C) Team captain
- (I) Import player
- (AI) Asian import player
- Injured

- Roster
Updated: April 22, 2022

== Hsinchu JKO Lioneers Masters Game ==
October 23, 2021
17:00 (UTC+8)

Taiwan Beer team	81–95	Hsinchu JKO Lioneers

Hsinchu County Stadium, Hsinchu County

== Preseason ==
=== Game log ===
2021 preseason game log
Total: 1–0 (home: 0–0; road: 1–0)
Preseason : 1–0 (home: 0–0; road: 1–0)

Game	Date	Team	Score	High points	High rebounds	High assists	Location Attendance	Record
1	November 13	@ Suns	W 88–74	Huang Jhen (18)	Chou Po-Hsun (13)	Chou Tzu-Hua (6)	Kaohsiung Arena; 3,288	1–0

Color： Win Lose
Schedule

== Regular season ==
=== Standings ===
Pos	Team	Pld	W	L	PCT	GB	Qualification
1	Kaohsiung Aquas	30	23	7	.767	—	Advance to semifinals
2	Taichung Wagor Suns	30	20	10	.667	3	Advance to semifinals
3	New Taipei CTBC DEA	30	17	13	.567	6	Advance to semifinals
4	TaiwanBeer HeroBears	30	16	14	.533	7	Advance to play-in
5	Taoyuan Leopards	30	8	22	.267	15	Advance to play-in
6	Tainan TSG GhostHawks	30	6	24	.200	17	

Source: T1 League

=== Game log ===
2021–22 regular season game log
Total: 16–14 (home: 9–6; road: 7–8)
November : 0–1 (home: 0–1; road: 0–0)

Game	Date	Team	Score	High points	High rebounds	High assists	Location Attendance	Record
1	November 27	Aquas	L 106–107	Diamond Stone (44)	Diamond Stone (13)	Tony Mitchell (6); Chiang Yu-An (6)	University of Taipei Tianmu Campus Gymnasium; 3,456	0–1

December : 4–2 (home: 2–0; road: 2–2)

Game	Date	Team	Score	High points	High rebounds	High assists	Location Attendance	Record
2	December 4	@ DEA	W 95–94 (OT)	Diamond Stone (26)	Diamond Stone (17)	Tony Mitchell (8)	Xinzhuang Gymnasium; 6,323	1–1
3	December 11	Suns	W 117–111	Diamond Stone (47)	Diamond Stone (12)	Tony Mitchell (10)	University of Taipei Tianmu Campus Gymnasium	2–1
4	December 12	Leopards	W 102–93	Diamond Stone (24)	Chiang Yu-An (10)	Diamond Stone (7); Chiang Yu-An (7)	University of Taipei Tianmu Campus Gymnasium	3–1
5	December 19	@ GhostHawks	W 102–83	Diamond Stone (33)	Diamond Stone (19)	Tony Mitchell (4); Lee Chi-Wei (4)	Chia Nan University of Pharmacy and Science Shao Tsung Gymnasium	4–1
6	December 25	@ Suns	L 102–110	Diamond Stone (35)	Diamond Stone (15)	Tony Mitchell (5); Chiang Yu-An (5)	National Taiwan University of Sport Gymnasium	4–2
7	December 31	@ Aquas	L 113–114	Diamond Stone (29)	Diamond Stone (12)	Chiang Yu-An (8)	Kaohsiung Arena; 3,321	4–3

January : 3–1 (home: 0–0; road: 3–1)

Game	Date	Team	Score	High points	High rebounds	High assists	Location Attendance	Record
8	January 2	@ Suns	W 95–88	Diamond Stone (26)	Diamond Stone (15)	Chiang Yu-An (8)	National Taiwan University of Sport Gymnasium	5–3
9	January 8	@ Suns	W 91–84	Chiang Yu-An (28)	Diamond Stone (14)	Diamond Stone (9)	National Taiwan University of Sport Gymnasium	6–3
10	January 15	@ DEA	L 95–113	Chiang Yu-An (30)	Diamond Stone (15)	Chou Tzu-Hua (5)	Xinzhuang Gymnasium	6–4
—	January 22	GhostHawks	Postponed to May 7					
—	January 23	Aquas	Postponed to May 8					
—	January 29	@ Leopards	Postponed to April 30					
11	January 30	@ Aquas	W 100–94	Ramon Galloway (38)	Diamond Stone (14)	Ramon Galloway (7)	Kaohsiung Arena; No in-person attendance	7–4

February : 3–2 (home: 2–2; road: 1–0)

Game	Date	Team	Score	High points	High rebounds	High assists	Location Attendance	Record
12	February 12	@ GhostHawks	W 114–105	Ramon Galloway (40)	Diamond Stone (12)	Chiang Yu-An (10)	Chia Nan University of Pharmacy and Science Shao Tsung Gymnasium	8–4
13	February 19	DEA	L 94–115	Diamond Stone (25)	Diamond Stone (10)	Chou Tzu-Hua (5)	Taipei Heping Basketball Gymnasium; 2,468	8–5
14	February 20	Suns	L 95–115	Ramon Galloway (23)	Doral Moore (8)	Ramon Galloway (5)	Taipei Heping Basketball Gymnasium	8–6
15	February 25	DEA	W 118–116	Chiang Yu-An (43)	Diamond Stone (10)	Chiang Yu-An (10)	University of Taipei Tianmu Campus Gymnasium	9–6
16	February 26	Aquas	W 131–125 (OT)	Chiang Yu-An (33); Ramon Galloway (33)	Doral Moore (13)	Chiang Yu-An (12)	University of Taipei Tianmu Campus Gymnasium	10–6

March : 2–4 (home: 1–1; road: 1–3)

Game	Date	Team	Score	High points	High rebounds	High assists	Location Attendance	Record
17	March 4	@ DEA	L 127–135 (OT)	Ramon Galloway (29)	Diamond Stone (9); Doral Moore (9)	Chiang Yu-An (11)	Xinzhuang Gymnasium	10–7
18	March 5	GhostHawks	L 110–113	Ramon Galloway (27)	Ramon Galloway (11)	Ramon Galloway (14)	University of Taipei Tianmu Campus Gymnasium	10–8
19	March 6	Leopards	W 115–113	Chiang Yu-An (25); Lee Chi-Wei (25)	Diamond Stone (11)	Chiang Yu-An (13)	University of Taipei Tianmu Campus Gymnasium	11–8
20	March 12	@ Leopards	L 96–101	Ramon Galloway (31)	Chou Po-Hsun (13)	Ramon Galloway (7)	Chung Yuan Christian University Gymnasium	11–9
21	March 20	@ GhostHawks	L 99–110	Diamond Stone (25)	Diamond Stone (12)	Chiang Yu-An (6)	Chia Nan University of Pharmacy and Science Shao Tsung Gymnasium	11–10
22	March 26	@ Aquas	W 99–92	Lee Chi-Wei (23)	Samuel Deguara (10)	Diamond Stone (5)	Kaohsiung Arena	12–10

April : 3–2 (home: 3–1; road: 0–1)

Game	Date	Team	Score	High points	High rebounds	High assists	Location Attendance	Record
23	April 4	DEA	W 95–91	Chiang Yu-An (22); Samuel Deguara (22)	Samuel Deguara (18)	Chiang Yu-An (7)	University of Taipei Tianmu Campus Gymnasium; No in-person attendance	13–10
24	April 5	Leopards	W 120–88	Diamond Stone (24)	Samuel Deguara (13)	Chiang Yu-An (6); Tyler Lamb (6)	University of Taipei Tianmu Campus Gymnasium; No in-person attendance	14–10
25	April 9	Suns	W 119–118 (OT)	Diamond Stone (35)	Samuel Deguara (17); Diamond Stone (17)	Chiang Yu-An (12)	University of Taipei Tianmu Campus Gymnasium; No in-person attendance	15–10
26	April 10	GhostHawks	L 109–122	Tyler Lamb (21)	Diamond Stone (8)	Tyler Lamb (8)	University of Taipei Tianmu Campus Gymnasium; No in-person attendance	15–11
27	April 23	@ Leopards	L 134–135	Diamond Stone (50)	Samuel Deguara (25)	Chiang Yu-An (6)	Taipei Heping Basketball Gymnasium	15–12
—	April 30	@ Leopards	Postponed to May 6					

May : 1–2 (home: 1–1; road: 0–1)

Game	Date	Team	Score	High points	High rebounds	High assists	Location Attendance	Record
—	May 6	@ Leopards	Postponed to May 19					
—	May 7	GhostHawks	Postponed to May 18					
—	May 8	Aquas	Postponed to May 20					
28	May 18	GhostHawks	W 144–115	Diamond Stone (52)	Ronald Delph (20)	Chiang Yu-An (9)	University of Taipei Tianmu Campus Gymnasium	16–12
29	May 19	@ Leopards	L 104–110	Tyler Lamb (32)	Diamond Stone (13)	Chiang Yu-An (9)	Taoyuan Arena	16–13
30	May 20	Aquas	L 107–124	Ronald Delph (36)	Ronald Delph (14)	Tyler Lamb (4); Fan Shih-En (4)	University of Taipei Tianmu Campus Gymnasium	16–14

Color： Win Lose Postponed
Schedule

=== Regular season note ===
- Due to the COVID-19 pandemic preventive measures of Taipei City Government, the T1 League declared that the games on January 22 and 23 would be postponed to May 7 and 8.
- Due to the COVID-19 pandemic in Taiwan, the T1 League declared that the game on January 29 would be postponed to April 30. The games at the Kaohsiung Arena would play behind closed doors from January 28 to 30.
- Due to the COVID-19 pandemic in Taiwan, the T1 League declared that the games at the University of Taipei Tianmu Campus Gymnasium would play behind closed doors from April 4 to 10.
- Because a player of the TaiwanBeer HeroBears tested positive, the T1 League declared that the game on April 30 would be postponed to May 6.
- Due to the Taoyuan Leopards could not reach the minimum player number, the T1 League declared that the game on May 6 would be postponed to May 19.
- Because the TaiwanBeer HeroBears could not reach the minimum player number, the T1 League declared that the games on May 7 and 8 would be postponed to May 18 and 20.

== Playoffs ==
=== Game log ===
2022 playoffs game log
Total: 1–2 (home: 0–1; road: 1–1)
Play-in : 1–0 (home: 0–0; road: 1–0)

Game	Date	Team	Score	High points	High rebounds	High assists	Location Attendance	Series
1	May 22	@ Leopards	W 128–110	Tyler Lamb (31); Diamond Stone (31)	Samuel Deguara (10)	Chiang Yu-An (12)	Taoyuan Arena	2–0

Semifinals : 0–2 (home: 0–1; road: 0–1)

Game	Date	Team	Score	High points	High rebounds	High assists	Location Attendance	Series
1	May 25	@ Aquas	L 91–114	Diamond Stone (29)	Samuel Deguara (8)	Chiang Yu-An (5)	Fengshan Arena	0–1
2	May 27	Aquas	L 93–99	Diamond Stone (31)	Diamond Stone (18)	Chiang Yu-An (5)	University of Taipei Tianmu Campus Gymnasium	0–2

Color： Win Lose
Schedule

=== Play-in note ===
- The fourth seed, TaiwanBeer HeroBears, was awarded a one-win advantage before the play-in series.

== Player statistics ==
Legend
GP	Games played	MPG	Minutes per game	2P%	2-point field goal percentage
3P%	3-point field goal percentage	FT%	Free throw percentage	RPG	Rebounds per game
APG	Assists per game	SPG	Steals per game	BPG	Blocks per game
PPG	Points per game		Led the league

=== Regular season ===
Player	GP	MPG	PPG	2P%	3P%	FT%	RPG	APG	SPG	BPG
Huang Jhen	29	16:31	5.3	55.4%	28.6%	81.3%	2.6	1.7	0.7	0.1
Tony Mitchell^{‡}	9	34:36	18.2	50.7%	24.2%	75.0%	7.8	4.8	1.1	1.4
Tyler Lamb^{≠}	11	28:38	16.5	51.4%	37.7%	91.3%	4.5	3.1	1.5	1.1
Chou Tzu-Hua^{‡}	17	10:30	1.1	22.2%	29.4%	0.0%	1.2	1.9	0.2	0.1
Chien Chao-Yi	17	6:27	1.5	37.5%	40.0%	50.0%	0.4	1.0	0.4	0.0
Huang Tsung-Han	22	14:26	4.4	47.4%	22.2%	61.9%	1.6	1.0	0.4	0.1
Chiang Yu-An	27	40:30	19.2	50.0%	38.6%	79.7%	4.7	6.8	1.8	0.3
Fan Shih-En	9	11:20	1.7	45.5%	0.0%	62.5%	2.1	1.0	0.7	0.0
Chou Po-Hsun	27	23:27	5.9	53.5%	33.3%	68.9%	6.2	1.2	0.6	0.2
Samuel Deguara^{≠}	6	31:59	23.0	75.8%	0.0%	79.2%	14.7	1.3	0.7	0.8
Ronald Delph^{≠}	10	18:45	9.8	42.9%	47.4%	57.9%	7.9	0.5	0.4	0.6
Chu I-Tsung	25	18:51	5.6	58.5%	30.9%	63.6%	3.2	1.6	0.6	0.2
Doral Moore^{≠‡}	9	17:46	8.6	60.8%	0.0%	60.0%	7.6	0.8	0.0	1.3
Wang Hao-Chi	16	14:53	2.6	30.8%	33.3%	50.0%	2.6	1.0	0.4	0.1
Diamond Stone	30	40:40	27.5	47.5%	35.7%	79.0%	11.5	2.3	1.5	1.1
Ramon Galloway^{≠‡}	11	37:23	26.0	48.4%	39.2%	91.7%	6.3	6.3	1.8	0.7
Lee Chi-Wei	27	32:32	11.4	47.3%	39.5%	72.7%	2.8	2.3	0.8	0.6

^{‡} Left during the season
^{≠} Acquired during the season

=== Play-in ===
Player	GP	MPG	PPG	2P%	3P%	FT%	RPG	APG	SPG	BPG
Huang Jhen	1	6:03	3.0	0.0%	100.0%	0.0%	1.0	1.0	0.0	0.0
Tyler Lamb	1	39:53	31.0	50.0%	61.5%	50.0%	4.0	2.0	0.0	0.0
Chien Chao-Yi	Did not play									
Huang Tsung-Han	Did not play									
Chiang Yu-An	1	47:07	24.0	44.4%	22.2%	100.0%	9.0	12.0	1.0	0.0
Fan Shih-En	Did not play									
Chou Po-Hsun	1	33:47	2.0	33.3%	0.0%	0.0%	9.0	0.0	0.0	0.0
Samuel Deguara	1	19:44	14.0	85.7%	0.0%	66.7%	10.0	1.0	0.0	0.0
Ronald Delph	Did not play									
Chu I-Tsung	1	36:26	12.0	75.0%	40.0%	0.0%	7.0	1.0	0.0	0.0
Wang Hao-Chi	Did not play									
Diamond Stone	1	28:16	31.0	58.3%	28.6%	100.0%	5.0	3.0	1.0	1.0
Lee Chi-Wei	1	28:44	11.0	33.3%	75.0%	0.0%	3.0	0.0	1.0	0.0

=== Semifinals ===
Player	GP	MPG	PPG	2P%	3P%	FT%	RPG	APG	SPG	BPG
Huang Jhen	2	8:33	0.0	0.0%	0.0%	0.0%	0.0	0.5	0.0	0.0
Tyler Lamb	2	34:30	13.0	38.5%	30.0%	87.5%	4.5	4.0	3.0	0.5
Chien Chao-Yi	2	1:45	1.0	50.0%	0.0%	0.0%	0.0	0.0	0.0	0.0
Huang Tsung-Han	1	1:38	0.0	0.0%	0.0%	0.0%	0.0	0.0	0.0	0.0
Chiang Yu-An	2	43:24	18.0	75.0%	25.0%	81.8%	6.0	5.0	0.5	0.0
Fan Shih-En	2	3:09	0.0	0.0%	0.0%	0.0%	0.5	0.0	0.0	0.0
Chou Po-Hsun	2	13:29	0.0	0.0%	0.0%	0.0%	1.5	1.0	0.0	0.5
Samuel Deguara	2	18:42	8.0	54.5%	0.0%	50.0%	9.0	0.5	0.5	0.0
Ronald Delph	2	18:29	9.0	71.4%	66.7%	100.0%	5.0	0.0	0.5	0.5
Chu I-Tsung	2	25:14	4.5	50.0%	0.0%	75.0%	1.5	1.5	1.5	0.0
Wang Hao-Chi	Did not play									
Diamond Stone	2	43:14	30.0	51.4%	14.3%	90.0%	12.0	1.0	0.5	2.0
Lee Chi-Wei	2	28:38	8.5	62.5%	16.7%	25.0%	2.5	1.5	1.0	0.0

- Reference：

== Transactions ==
On December 24, Maciej Lampe took a plane to Spain for recovery.

=== Overview ===
Players added

Via free agency

- Chien Chao-Yi
- Chou Tzu-Hua
- Samuel Deguara
- Ronald Delph
- Tyler Lamb
- Maciej Lampe
- Tony Mitchell
- Diamond Stone

Transfer from Taiwan Beer

- Chiang Yu-An
- Chou Po-Hsun
- Chu I-Tsung
- Fan Shih-En
- Ramon Galloway
- Huang Jhen
- Huang Tsung-Han
- Lee Chi-Wei
- Doral Moore
- Wang Hao-Chi
Players lost

Via trade

- Chou Tzu-Hua

Waived

- Ramon Galloway
- Maciej Lampe
- Tony Mitchell
- Doral Moore

=== Trades ===
Date	Trade		Ref.
March 16, 2022	To TaiwanBeer HeroBears: 2022 Suns' second-round pick; 2023 Suns' second-round pick	To Taichung Wagor Suns: Chou Tzu-Hua	

=== Transfer from Taiwan Beer ===
Date	Player	Ref.
September 2, 2021	Chiang Yu-An	
September 2, 2021	Huang Tsung-Han	
September 2, 2021	Lee Chi-Wei	
September 2, 2021	Fan Shih-En	
September 2, 2021	Huang Jhen	
September 2, 2021	Chou Po-Hsun	
September 2, 2021	Chu I-Tsung	
September 2, 2021	Wang Hao-Chi	
January 27, 2022	Ramon Galloway	
February 10, 2022	Doral Moore	

=== Free agency ===
==== Additions ====
Date	Player	Contract terms	Former team	Ref.
September 2, 2021	Chou Tzu-Hua	—N/a	(Taiwan) Formosa Dreamers	
September 9, 2021	Maciej Lampe	—N/a	(France) Limoges CSP	
October 1, 2021	Tony Mitchell	—N/a	(Morocco) AS Salé	
October 21, 2021	Chien Chao-Yi	—N/a	(Taiwan) Fubon Braves	
November 9, 2021	Diamond Stone	—N/a	(Puerto Rico) Gigantes de Carolina	
February 23, 2022	Tyler Lamb	—N/a	(Thailand) Mono Vampire	
March 9, 2022	Ronald Delph	—N/a	(Scotland) Glasgow Rocks	
March 21, 2022	Samuel Deguara	—N/a	(Taiwan) Taipei Fubon Braves	

==== Subtractions ====
Date	Player	Reason	New team	Ref.
February 4, 2022	Tony Mitchell	Contract terminated	(Dominican Republic) Soles de Santo Domingo Este	
February 4, 2022	Maciej Lampe	Contract terminated	(Poland) ŁKS Coolpack Łódź	
March 21, 2022	Doral Moore	Contract terminated	(Mexico) Ostioneros de Guaymas	
April 22, 2022	Ramon Galloway	Contract terminated	(Dominican Republic) Metros de Santiago	

== Awards ==
=== Yearly awards ===
Recipient	Award	Ref.
Diamond Stone	Points Leader	
Chiang Yu-An	All-Defensive First Team	
Chiang Yu-An	All-T1 League First Team	
Chiang Yu-An	Most Valuable Player	

=== MVP of the Month ===
Month	Recipient	Award	Ref.
December	Chiang Yu-An	December MVP of the Month	
February	Chiang Yu-An	February MVP of the Month	
