= 2021–22 Tainan TSG GhostHawks season =

Taiwanese professional basketball season

- President: Sun Cheng-Chiang
- General Manager: Chien Wei-Cheng
- Head Coach: Wu Chih-Wei (transferred to team director); Liu Meng-Chu (interim)
- Arena: Chia Nan University of Pharmacy and Science Shao Tsung Gymnasium

T1 League results
- Record: 6–24 (20.0%)
- Place: 6th
- Playoffs finish: Did not qualify

Player records
- Points: William Artino 26.5
- Rebounds: William Artino 15.8
- Assists: Liu Jen-Hao 4.1

The 2021–22 Tainan TSG GhostHawks season was the franchise's first season, its first season in the T1 League.

The GhostHawks were coached by Wu Chih-Wei in his first year as their head coach. On August 11, 2021, the Tainan team hired Chien Wei-Cheng as their general manager. On April 1, 2022, the GhostHawks named Wu Chih-Wei as their team director, and Liu Meng-Chu, the consultant of the Tainan TSG GhostHawks, as their interim head coach.

== Draft ==
Round	Player	Position(s)	School / club team
1	Lan Shao-Fu	Power forward / center	NTSU
2	Su Chih-Cheng	Guard	NTSU
3	Lin Tzu-Feng	Shooting guard / small forward	UCH
4	Liu Chun-Ting	Shooting guard / small forward	UCH
5	Wu Nien-Che	Shooting guard	NTUST

- Reference：

On August 23, 2021, the first rounder, Lan Shao-Fu had joined the Kaohsiung Steelers of the P. League+.

On September 28, 2021, the second rounder, Su Chih-Cheng had joined the Taoyuan Pilots of the P. League+.

== Roster ==
2021–22 Tainan TSG GhostHawks roster
Players
Coaches

Pos.	No.	Nat.	Name	Ht.	Wt.	Age	From
SF	0	(Taiwan)	Chang Wei-Hsiang	1.90 m (6 ft 3 in)	90 kg (198 lb)	26 – 15 May 1996	NTUA
SG	3	(Taiwan)	Chiang Chiao-An	1.80 m (5 ft 11 in)	82 kg (181 lb)	27 – 7 December 1994	UCH
SF	5	(Taiwan)	Chang Chia-Jung	1.92 m (6 ft 4 in)	80 kg (176 lb)	33 – 28 September 1988	HWU
SF	6	(Taiwan)	Liu Chun-Ting	1.87 m (6 ft 2 in)	75 kg (165 lb)	23 – 31 March 1999	UCH
PG	7	(Taiwan)	Kao Kuo-Chiang	1.72 m (5 ft 8 in)	70 kg (154 lb)	25 – 23 March 1997	SHU
SG	11	(Taiwan) (Australia)	Oscar Lin	1.84 m (6 ft 0 in)	100 kg (220 lb)	26 – 21 August 1995	UCH
SG	16	(Taiwan)	Lin Tzu-Feng	1.84 m (6 ft 0 in)	85 kg (187 lb)	23 – 30 October 1998	UCH
SF	17	(Taiwan)	Tseng Pin-Fu	1.95 m (6 ft 5 in)	85 kg (187 lb)	26 – 1 March 1996	UCH
SF	19	(Taiwan)	Tsai Yao-Hsun	1.90 m (6 ft 3 in)	86 kg (190 lb)	38 – 24 November 1983	TPEC
SG	25	(United States)	Jordan Chatman (I)	1.96 m (6 ft 5 in)	88 kg (194 lb)	28 – 21 May 1993	Boston College
C	31	(United States) (Taiwan)	William Artino (N)	2.11 m (6 ft 11 in)	100 kg (220 lb)	29 – 27 June 1992	Creighton
PF	36	(Belize) (United States)	Charles García (I)	2.04 m (6 ft 8 in)	108 kg (238 lb)	33 – 13 October 1988	Seattle
SF	41	(United States)	Marcus Gilbert (I)	1.98 m (6 ft 6 in)	84 kg (185 lb)	29 – 1 January 1993	Fairfield
PG	72	(Taiwan)	Lu Chi-Erh	1.87 m (6 ft 2 in)	80 kg (176 lb)	30 – 15 January 1992	NKNU
C	88	(Taiwan)	Lung Hung-Yuan (C)	1.93 m (6 ft 4 in)	112 kg (247 lb)	33 – 24 October 1988	CCU

Head coach

- (Taiwan) Liu Meng-Chu (interim)

Assistant coach(es)

- (Taiwan) Ma I-Hung

Team manager

- (Taiwan) Chien Wei-Cheng

Legend

- (C) Team captain
- (I) Import player
- (N) Naturalised player
- Injured

- Roster
Updated: May 5, 2022

== Friendly match ==
September 30, 2021

Kaohsiung Jeoutai Technology	74–59	Tainan TSG GhostHawks

== Hsinchu JKO Lioneers Masters Game ==
October 24, 2021
17:00 (UTC+8)

Tainan TSG GhostHawks	58–94	Hsinchu JKO Lioneers

Hsinchu County Stadium, Hsinchu County

== Preseason ==
=== Game log ===
2021 preseason game log
Total: 1–0 (home: 1–0; road: 0–0)
Preseason : 1–0 (home: 1–0; road: 0–0)

Game	Date	Team	Score	High points	High rebounds	High assists	Location Attendance	Record
1	November 13	Leopards	W 97–87	Charles García (26)	Charles García (14)	Lin Tzu-Feng (8)	Kaohsiung Arena; 3,288	1–0

Color： Win Lose
Schedule

== Invitational match ==
December 2, 2021

Hsinchu JKO Lioneers	133–98	Tainan TSG GhostHawks

Chia Nan University of Pharmacy and Science Shao Tsung Gymnasium, Tainan City

== Regular season ==
=== Standings ===
Pos	Team	Pld	W	L	PCT	GB	Qualification
1	Kaohsiung Aquas	30	23	7	.767	—	Advance to semifinals
2	Taichung Wagor Suns	30	20	10	.667	3	Advance to semifinals
3	New Taipei CTBC DEA	30	17	13	.567	6	Advance to semifinals
4	TaiwanBeer HeroBears	30	16	14	.533	7	Advance to play-in
5	Taoyuan Leopards	30	8	22	.267	15	Advance to play-in
6	Tainan TSG GhostHawks	30	6	24	.200	17	

Source: T1 League

=== Game log ===
2021–22 regular season game log
Total: 6–24 (home: 3–12; road: 3–12)
December : 1–3 (home: 0–2; road: 1–1)

Game	Date	Team	Score	High points	High rebounds	High assists	Location Attendance	Record
1	December 12	@ DEA	L 81–108	Charles García (22)	Charles García (12)	Charles García (7)	Xinzhuang Gymnasium	0–1
2	December 18	Leopards	L 81–89	Charles García (26)	Charles García (14)	Liu Jen-Hao (4)	Chia Nan University of Pharmacy and Science Shao Tsung Gymnasium	0–2
3	December 19	HeroBears	L 83–102	Jordan Chatman (29)	Charles García (15)	Liu Jen-Hao (3); Kao Kuo-Chiang (3)	Chia Nan University of Pharmacy and Science Shao Tsung Gymnasium	0–3
4	December 26	@ Leopards	W 114–83	Jordan Chatman (26)	William Artino (15)	Charles García (5)	Chung Yuan Christian University Gymnasium	1–3

January : 1–5 (home: 1–3; road: 0–2)

Game	Date	Team	Score	High points	High rebounds	High assists	Location Attendance	Record
5	January 1	Leopards	W 132–113	William Artino (41)	William Artino (22)	William Artino (8)	Chia Nan University of Pharmacy and Science Shao Tsung Gymnasium	2–3
6	January 2	Aquas	L 95–126	William Artino (33)	William Artino (12)	Liu Jen-Hao (5)	Chia Nan University of Pharmacy and Science Shao Tsung Gymnasium	2–4
7	January 9	@ Aquas	L 83–96	William Artino (27)	William Artino (15)	Liu Jen-Hao (2); Chang Chia-Jung (2); Jordan Chatman (2); Oscar Lin (2); Charles García (2)	Kaohsiung Arena	2–5
8	January 16	@ DEA	L 104–116	William Artino (29)	Liu Jen-Hao (10); William Artino (10)	Liu Jen-Hao (7)	Xinzhuang Gymnasium	2–6
—	January 22	@ HeroBears	Postponed to May 7					
9	January 29	DEA	L 97–115	Charles García (24)	William Artino (17)	Liu Jen-Hao (5)	Chia Nan University of Pharmacy and Science Shao Tsung Gymnasium	2–7
10	January 30	Suns	L 95–98	William Artino (41)	William Artino (20)	Liu Jen-Hao (6)	Chia Nan University of Pharmacy and Science Shao Tsung Gymnasium	2–8

February : 0–4 (home: 0–4; road: 0–0)

Game	Date	Team	Score	High points	High rebounds	High assists	Location Attendance	Record
11	February 12	HeroBears	L 105–114	Charles García (33)	William Artino (12); Charles García (12)	Liu Jen-Hao (8)	Chia Nan University of Pharmacy and Science Shao Tsung Gymnasium	2–9
12	February 13	DEA	L 88–102	William Artino (32)	William Artino (23)	Liu Jen-Hao (3)	Chia Nan University of Pharmacy and Science Shao Tsung Gymnasium	2–10
—	February 19	@ Leopards	Postponed to March 25					
13	February 27	DEA	L 103–119	Marcus Gilbert (27)	Charles García (11)	Negus Webster-Chan (5)	Chia Nan University of Pharmacy and Science Shao Tsung Gymnasium	2–11
14	February 28	Leopards	L 99–118	Charles García (27)	Charles García (13)	Marcus Gilbert (4); Charles García (4)	Chia Nan University of Pharmacy and Science Shao Tsung Gymnasium	2–12

March : 2–5 (home: 1–1; road: 1–4)

Game	Date	Team	Score	High points	High rebounds	High assists	Location Attendance	Record
15	March 5	@ HeroBears	W 113–110	Marcus Gilbert (28); Charles García (28)	Charles García (10)	Liu Jen-Hao (7)	University of Taipei Tianmu Campus Gymnasium	3–12
16	March 12	@ Suns	L 91–115	Charles García (24)	Marcus Gilbert (10)	Marcus Gilbert (4)	National Taiwan University of Sport Gymnasium	3–13
17	March 13	@ Leopards	L 84–97	Jordan Chatman (22)	King Revolution (13)	Liu Jen-Hao (5)	Chung Yuan Christian University Gymnasium	3–14
18	March 19	Suns	L 85–112	Liu Chun-Ting (16); Jordan Chatman (16)	Charles García (11)	Chiang Chiao-An (4); Liu Chun-Ting (4)	Chia Nan University of Pharmacy and Science Shao Tsung Gymnasium	3–15
19	March 20	HeroBears	W 110–99	Marcus Gilbert (35)	Marcus Gilbert (8)	Liu Jen-Hao (6); Charles García (6)	Chia Nan University of Pharmacy and Science Shao Tsung Gymnasium	4–15
20	March 25	@ Leopards	L 93–109	William Artino (23)	William Artino (16)	Charles García (7)	Chung Yuan Christian University Gymnasium	4–16
21	March 27	@ Aquas	L 93–103	Lester Prosper (26)	William Artino (14)	William Artino (4)	Kaohsiung Arena	4–17

April : 2–6 (home: 1–2; road: 1–4)

Game	Date	Team	Score	High points	High rebounds	High assists	Location Attendance	Record
22	April 2	@ Suns	L 88–105	Charles García (29)	William Artino (14)	Lu Chi-Erh (5)	National Taiwan University of Sport Gymnasium	4–18
23	April 3	Aquas	L 77–102	Jordan Chatman (21)	William Artino (17)	Tsai Yao-Hsun (3); Jordan Chatman (3)	Chia Nan University of Pharmacy and Science Shao Tsung Gymnasium	4–19
24	April 10	@ HeroBears	W 122–109	Charles García (29)	William Artino (13)	Charles García (10)	University of Taipei Tianmu Campus Gymnasium; No in-person attendance	5–19
25	April 16	@ Aquas	L 81–100	Charles García (26)	William Artino (18)	Charles García (6)	Kaohsiung Arena	5–20
26	April 17	@ Suns	L 101–126	Lu Chi-Erh (22)	Lester Prosper (11)	Marcus Gilbert (5); Lu Chi-Erh (5)	National Taiwan University of Sport Gymnasium	5–21
27	April 23	Aquas	W 91–76	Lu Chi-Erh (21)	William Artino (25)	William Artino (9)	Chia Nan University of Pharmacy and Science Shao Tsung Gymnasium	6–21
28	April 24	Suns	L 111–119	William Artino (30)	William Artino (12)	Charles García (7)	Chia Nan University of Pharmacy and Science Shao Tsung Gymnasium	6–22
29	April 30	@ DEA	L 101–133	William Artino (33)	Charles García (15)	Charles García (6)	Xinzhuang Gymnasium	6–23

May : 0–1 (home: 0–0; road: 0–1)

Game	Date	Team	Score	High points	High rebounds	High assists	Location Attendance	Record
—	May 7	@ HeroBears	Postponed to May 18					
30	May 18	@ HeroBears	L 115–144	Jordan Chatman (44)	Marcus Gilbert (10)	Chang Wei-Hsiang (4); Jordan Chatman (4); Lu Chi-Erh (4)	University of Taipei Tianmu Campus Gymnasium	6–24

Color： Win Lose Postponed
Schedule

=== Regular season note ===
- Due to the COVID-19 pandemic preventive measures of Taipei City Government, the T1 League declared that the game on January 22 would be postponed to May 7.
- Due to the COVID-19 pandemic in Taiwan, the T1 League declared that the game on February 19 would be postponed to March 25.
- Due to the COVID-19 pandemic in Taiwan, the T1 League declared that the games at the University of Taipei Tianmu Campus Gymnasium would play behind closed doors from April 4 to 10.
- Because the TaiwanBeer HeroBears could not reach the minimum player number, the T1 League declared that the game on May 7 would be postponed to May 18.

== Player statistics ==
Legend
GP	Games played	MPG	Minutes per game	2P%	2-point field goal percentage
3P%	3-point field goal percentage	FT%	Free throw percentage	RPG	Rebounds per game
APG	Assists per game	SPG	Steals per game	BPG	Blocks per game
PPG	Points per game		Led the league

=== Regular season ===
Player	GP	MPG	PPG	2P%	3P%	FT%	RPG	APG	SPG	BPG
Chang Wei-Hsiang	27	22:26	6.1	43.4%	13.3%	59.3%	2.7	0.9	0.4	0.2
Liu Jen-Hao^{‡}	20	32:35	5.6	36.2%	25.0%	70.8%	4.1	4.1	1.5	0.1
Chiang Chiao-An	22	10:50	1.9	33.3%	16.2%	68.8%	0.5	0.7	0.3	0.0
King Revolution^{≠‡}	2	30:25	17.0	47.4%	25.0%	77.8%	10.0	1.5	0.5	1.0
Chang Chia-Jung	17	13:26	2.9	46.7%	18.4%	100.0%	1.8	0.7	0.5	0.1
Liu Chun-Ting	23	20:13	5.0	49.3%	19.6%	51.6%	2.7	1.3	0.7	0.1
Kao Kuo-Chiang	19	10:13	2.1	33.3%	23.3%	20.0%	1.2	1.4	0.6	0.0
Wu Nien-Che	Did not play									
Oscar Lin	13	21:04	6.4	60.0%	34.1%	80.0%	1.2	1.2	0.5	0.1
Huang Tsung-Han	5	2:46	0.2	0.0%	0.0%	25.0%	1.2	0.0	0.0	0.0
Negus Webster-Chan^{‡}	7	20:28	9.4	41.7%	39.0%	66.7%	4.4	2.6	0.4	0.3
Lin Tzu-Feng	5	3:50	0.6	0.0%	33.3%	0.0%	1.2	0.2	0.0	0.0
Tseng Pin-Fu	15	9:06	1.3	22.2%	25.0%	100.0%	1.4	0.3	0.2	0.1
Tsai Yao-Hsun	17	21:43	6.6	35.6%	38.8%	33.3%	1.9	1.5	0.5	0.1
Jordan Chatman	21	31:48	17.9	48.9%	36.8%	77.4%	4.7	2.0	1.3	0.4
William Artino^{≠}	18	42:00	26.5	56.5%	29.4%	45.8%	15.8	3.2	2.2	0.7
Lester Prosper^{≠‡}	8	21:15	10.5	46.9%	23.1%	65.2%	6.3	0.8	1.3	1.1
Charles García	26	33:01	21.9	46.8%	29.1%	77.8%	9.5	4.0	1.0	0.5
Marcus Gilbert	19	31:34	17.7	50.0%	35.1%	79.4%	6.4	2.5	0.8	0.3
Lu Chi-Erh^{≠}	11	41:29	14.1	40.2%	33.9%	80.0%	5.4	3.1	1.3	0.0
Lung Hung-Yuan	23	12:35	3.3	38.6%	25.0%	76.9%	2.7	0.7	0.5	0.0

^{‡} Left during the season
^{≠} Acquired during the season

- Reference：

== Transactions ==
On March 23, 2022, Wu Nien-Che was not registered in the 2021–22 T1 League season final rosters.

=== Overview ===
Players added

Via draft

- Lin Tzu-Feng
- Liu Chun-Ting
- Wu Nien-Che

Via trade

- Lu Chi-Erh

Via free agency

- William Artino
- Chang Chia-Jung
- Chang Wei-Hsiang
- Jordan Chatman
- Chiang Chiao-An
- Charles García
- Marcus Gilbert
- Huang Tsung-Han
- Kao Kuo-Chiang
- Oscar Lin
- Liu Jen-Hao
- Lung Hung-Yuan
- Lester Prosper
- King Revolution
- Hasheem Thabeet
- Tsai Yao-Hsun
- Tseng Pin-Fu
- Negus Webster-Chan
Players lost

Via free agency

- Liu Jen-Hao
- Hasheem Thabeet

Waived

- Lester Prosper
- King Revolution
- Negus Webster-Chan

=== Trades ===
Date	Trade		Ref.
March 19, 2022	To Tainan TSG GhostHawks: Lu Chi-Erh	To New Taipei CTBC DEA: Cash considerations	

=== Free agency ===
==== Additions ====
Date	Player	Contract terms	Former team	Ref.
October 8, 2021	Chang Wei-Hsiang	—N/a	(Taiwan) Yulon Luxgen Dinos	
October 8, 2021	Chiang Chiao-An	—N/a	(Taiwan) UCH	
October 8, 2021	Chang Chia-Jung	—N/a	(Taiwan) Kaohsiung Jeoutai Technology	
October 8, 2021	Liu Chun-Ting	—N/a	(Taiwan) UCH	
October 8, 2021	Kao Kuo-Chiang	—N/a	(Taiwan) Lioneers Jr. Team head coach	
October 8, 2021	Wu Nien-Che	—N/a	(Taiwan) NTUST	
October 8, 2021	Huang Tsung-Han	—N/a	(Taiwan) NTNU	
October 8, 2021	Lin Tzu-Feng	—N/a	(Taiwan) UCH	
October 8, 2021	Lung Hung-Yuan	—N/a	Bank of Taiwan	
October 8, 2021	Tseng Pin-Fu	—N/a	(Taiwan) UCH	
October 22, 2021	Charles García	—N/a	(Taiwan) Taipei Fubon Braves	
October 28, 2021	Hasheem Thabeet	—N/a	(Taiwan) Hsinchu JKO Lioneers	
November 11, 2021	Tsai Yao-Hsun	—N/a	(Taiwan) HZSH basketball team head coach	
November 15, 2021	Oscar Lin	—N/a	(Taiwan) Taipei Fubon Braves	
November 17, 2021	Liu Jen-Hao	—N/a	(China) Foshan Gongfuxiaozi	
November 29, 2021	Jordan Chatman	—N/a	(Taiwan) Taoyuan Pilots	
November 30, 2021	Negus Webster-Chan	—N/a	(Canada) Ottawa Blackjacks	
December 1, 2021	Marcus Gilbert	—N/a	(Cyprus) APOEL B.C.	
December 24, 2021	William Artino	—N/a	(Uruguay) Hebraica Macabi	
March 4, 2022	King Revolution	—N/a	(Taiwan) Kaohsiung Jeoutai Technology	
March 20, 2022	Lester Prosper	—N/a	(Mexico) Halcones de Xalapa	

==== Subtractions ====
Date	Player	Reason	New team	Ref.
December 24, 2021	Hasheem Thabeet	Contract expired	(China) Sichuan Blue Whales	
March 17, 2022	Negus Webster-Chan	Contract terminated	(Taiwan) Kaohsiung Aquas	
March 22, 2022	King Revolution	Contract terminated	(Colombia) Caribbean Storm Islands	
March 30, 2022	Liu Jen-Hao	Back to Foshan Gongfuxiaozi		
May 5, 2022	Lester Prosper	Contract expired	(Philippines) Terrafirma Dyip	

== Awards ==
=== Yearly awards ===
Recipient	Award	Ref.
William Artino	Rebounds Leader	
