= 2021–22 New Taipei CTBC DEA season =

Taiwanese professional basketball season

- President: Chen Kuo-En
- General Manager: Chang Shu-Jen
- Head Coach: Lee Yi-Hua
- Arena: Xinzhuang Gymnasium

T1 League results
- Record: 17–13 (56.7%)
- Place: 3rd
- Playoffs finish: Semifinals (lost to Suns, 1–2)

Player records
- Points: Mohammad Al Bachir Gadiaga 20.7
- Rebounds: Marlon Johnson 11.4
- Assists: Mohammad Al Bachir Gadiaga 3.6

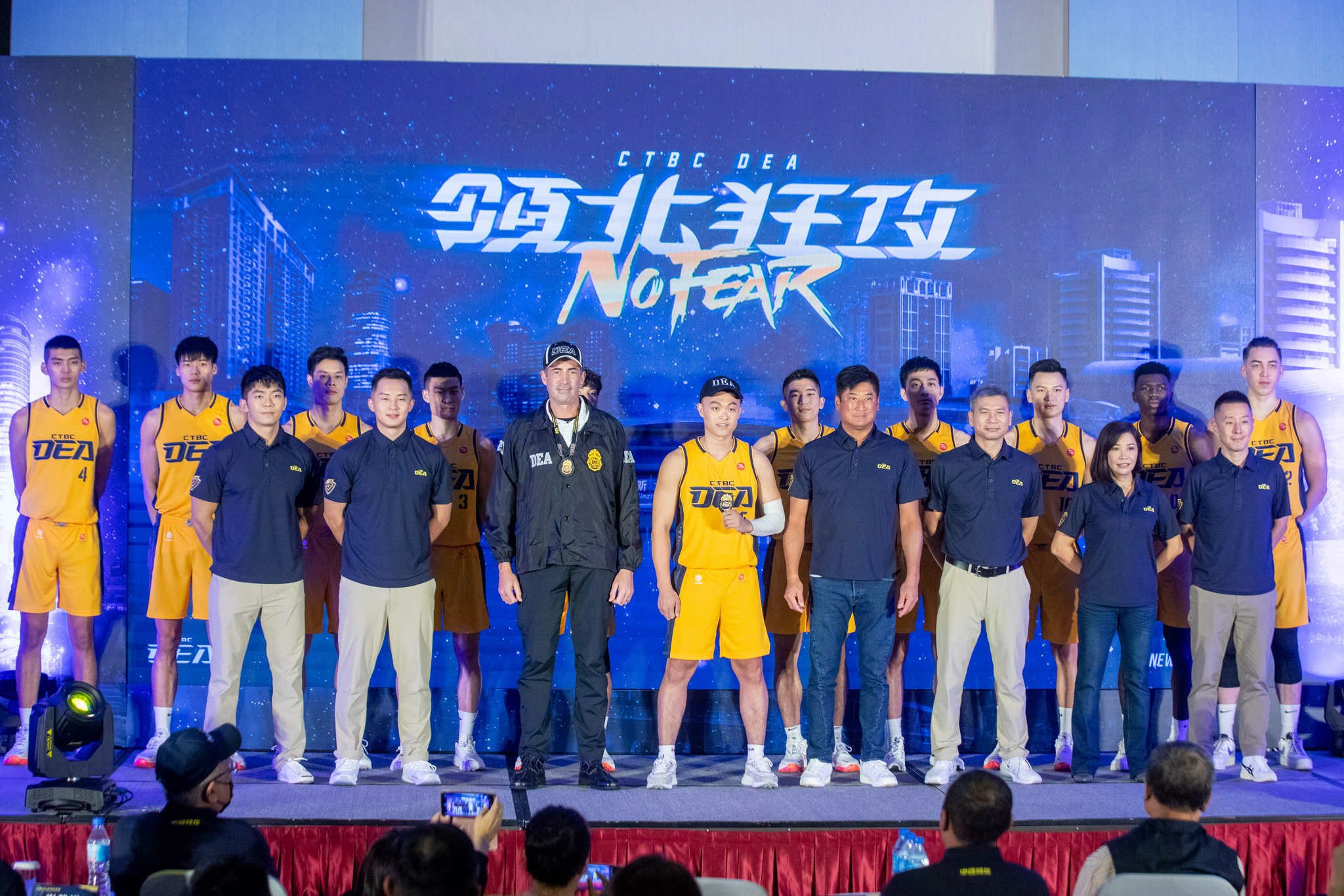
New Taipei CTBC DEA held the preseason press conference on November 6, 2021.

The 2021–22 New Taipei CTBC DEA season was the franchise's first season, its first season in the T1 League.

The DEA were coached by Lee Yi-Hua in his first year as their head coach. On July 30, 2021, the DEA hired Chang Shu-Jen as their general manager.

== Draft ==
Round	Player	Position(s)	School / club team
1	Mohammad Al Bachir Gadiaga	Shooting guard	SHU
1	Hsieh Ya-Hsuan	Guard / small forward	UCH
2	Wei Chia-Hao	Guard	FJU
3	Tung Fang Yi-Kang	Guard	Salesian High School
4	Liu Min-Yan	Forward / center	NKNU
5	Zhou Cheng-Rui	Power forward	CCU

- Reference：

On August 4, 2021, the DEA acquired 2021 first-round pick from Kaohsiung Aquas in exchange for cash considerations.

== Roster ==
2021–22 New Taipei CTBC DEA roster
Players
Coaches

Pos.	No.	Nat.	Name	Ht.	Wt.	Age	From
SF	0	(Taiwan)	Mohammad Al Bachir Gadiaga	1.89 m (6 ft 2 in)	92 kg (203 lb)	24 – 27 April 1998	SHU
PG	2	(Philippines) (United States)	Avery Scharer (AI)	1.88 m (6 ft 2 in)	80 kg (176 lb)	35 – 24 August 1986	Shoreline CC
SG	3	(Taiwan)	Lin Ping-Sheng	1.86 m (6 ft 1 in)	80 kg (176 lb)	25 – 26 December 1996	CCU
PF	4	(Taiwan)	Liu Min-Yan	1.95 m (6 ft 5 in)	85 kg (187 lb)	22 – 4 December 1999	NKNU
PG	6	(Taiwan)	Lee Hsueh-Lin (C)	1.75 m (5 ft 9 in)	81 kg (179 lb)	38 – 31 January 1984	TPEC
PG	7	(Taiwan)	Wei Chia-Hao	1.82 m (6 ft 0 in)	78 kg (172 lb)	22 – 13 January 2000	FJU
SG	8	(Taiwan)	Tung Fang Yi-Kang	1.81 m (5 ft 11 in)	81 kg (179 lb)	24 – 12 October 1997	NYCU
SG	10	(Taiwan)	Hsieh Ya-Hsuan	1.87 m (6 ft 2 in)	81 kg (179 lb)	23 – 30 October 1998	UCH
PF	11	(Taiwan)	Zhou Cheng-Rui	1.93 m (6 ft 4 in)	82 kg (181 lb)	22 – 24 February 2000	CCU
PF	12	(Taiwan) (United Kingdom)	Jonah Morrison	2.03 m (6 ft 8 in)	105 kg (231 lb)	21 – 2 June 2000	UBC
C	13	(United States)	Marlon Johnson (I)	2.08 m (6 ft 10 in)	98 kg (216 lb)	28 – 28 February 1994	New Mexico Highlands
C	15	(United States)	Kevin Allen (I)	2.11 m (6 ft 11 in)	120 kg (265 lb)	27 – 9 August 1994	Emporia State
PG	16	(Taiwan)	Lin Wei-Han	1.78 m (5 ft 10 in)	71 kg (157 lb)	31 – 9 July 1990	FJU
PF	21	(United States)	Aaron Epps (I)	2.06 m (6 ft 9 in)	102 kg (225 lb)	26 – 28 April 1996	LSU
SF	30	(Taiwan)	Liu Weir-Chern	1.90 m (6 ft 3 in)	84 kg (185 lb)	33 – 27 November 1988	MDU

Head coach

- (Taiwan) Lee Yi-Hua

Assistant coach(es)

- (Taiwan) Lai Kuo-Wei

Strength & conditioning coach(es)

- (Taiwan) Kao Hao-Han

Athletic trainer(s)

- (Taiwan) Chiu Ting-Chun
- (Taiwan) Li Kuo-Yi

Team manager

- (Taiwan) Chang Shu-Jen

Legend

- (C) Team captain
- (I) Import player
- (AI) Asian import player
- Injured

- Roster
Updated: April 11, 2022

== Hsinchu JKO Lioneers Masters Game ==
October 16, 2021
17:00 (UTC+8)

New Taipei CTBC DEA	89–93	Hsinchu JKO Lioneers

Hsinchu County Stadium, Hsinchu County

== Preseason ==
=== Game log ===
2021 preseason game log
Total: 1–0 (home: 0–0; road: 1–0)
Preseason : 1–0 (home: 0–0; road: 1–0)

Game	Date	Team	Score	High points	High rebounds	High assists	Location Attendance	Record
1	November 14	@ Aquas	W 101–86	Mohammad Al Bachir Gadiaga (32)	Jonah Morrison (12)	Wei Chia-Hao (7)	Kaohsiung Arena; 4,617	1–0

Color： Win Lose
Schedule

== Regular season ==
=== Standings ===
Pos	Team	Pld	W	L	PCT	GB	Qualification
1	Kaohsiung Aquas	30	23	7	.767	—	Advance to semifinals
2	Taichung Wagor Suns	30	20	10	.667	3	Advance to semifinals
3	New Taipei CTBC DEA	30	17	13	.567	6	Advance to semifinals
4	TaiwanBeer HeroBears	30	16	14	.533	7	Advance to play-in
5	Taoyuan Leopards	30	8	22	.267	15	Advance to play-in
6	Tainan TSG GhostHawks	30	6	24	.200	17	

Source: T1 League

=== Game log ===
2021–22 regular season game log
Total: 17–13 (home: 10–5; road: 7–8)
December : 3–3 (home: 2–2; road: 1–1)

Game	Date	Team	Score	High points	High rebounds	High assists	Location Attendance	Record
1	December 4	HeroBears	L 94–95 (OT)	Marlon Johnson (22)	Prince Ibeh (15)	Chanatip Jakrawan (3)	Xinzhuang Gymnasium; 6,323	0–1
2	December 5	Aquas	L 69–87	Mohammad Al Bachir Gadiaga (23)	Mohammad Al Bachir Gadiaga (11)	Mohammad Al Bachir Gadiaga (3); Marlon Johnson (3)	Xinzhuang Gymnasium; 4,632	0–2
3	December 11	Leopards	W 85–77	Mohammad Al Bachir Gadiaga (22)	Mohammad Al Bachir Gadiaga (13)	Jonah Morrison (8)	Xinzhuang Gymnasium	1–2
4	December 12	GhostHawks	W 108–81	Hsieh Ya-Hsuan (21)	Marlon Johnson (17)	Jonah Morrison (5)	Xinzhuang Gymnasium	2–2
5	December 18	@ Aquas	L 67–108	Lin Ping-Sheng (14)	Marlon Johnson (12)	Mohammad Al Bachir Gadiaga (2); Prince Ibeh (2); Lin Ping-Sheng (2); Marlon Johnson (2); Wei Chia-Hao (2)	Kaohsiung Arena; 8,268	2–3
6	December 25	@ Leopards	W 85–72	Mohammad Al Bachir Gadiaga (28)	Marlon Johnson (11)	Mohammad Al Bachir Gadiaga (3); Lin Ping-Sheng (3)	Chung Yuan Christian University Gymnasium; 2,086	3–3

January : 5–2 (home: 3–1; road: 2–1)

Game	Date	Team	Score	High points	High rebounds	High assists	Location Attendance	Record
7	January 1	@ Suns	W 95–85	Marlon Johnson (23)	Marlon Johnson (12)	Mohammad Al Bachir Gadiaga (5); Marlon Johnson (5)	National Taiwan University of Sport Gymnasium	4–3
8	January 8	@ Aquas	L 76–93	Marlon Johnson (21)	Marlon Johnson (14)	Lin Ping-Sheng (4)	Kaohsiung Arena; 2,633	4–4
9	January 15	HeroBears	W 113–95	Cleanthony Early (33)	Marlon Johnson (12)	Marlon Johnson (5); Cleanthony Early (5)	Xinzhuang Gymnasium	5–4
10	January 16	GhostHawks	W 116–104	Cleanthony Early (33)	Marlon Johnson (13)	Cleanthony Early (11)	Xinzhuang Gymnasium	6–4
11	January 22	Leopards	W 125–104	Cleanthony Early (36)	Cleanthony Early (15)	Wei Chia-Hao (9)	Xinzhuang Gymnasium	7–4
12	January 23	Suns	L 92–99	Cleanthony Early (31)	Marlon Johnson (10); Cleanthony Early (10)	Wei Chia-Hao (4)	Xinzhuang Gymnasium	7–5
13	January 29	@ GhostHawks	W 115–97	Cleanthony Early (29)	Marlon Johnson (14)	Mohammad Al Bachir Gadiaga (8)	Chia Nan University of Pharmacy and Science Shao Tsung Gymnasium	8–5

February : 3–1 (home: 0–0; road: 3–1)

Game	Date	Team	Score	High points	High rebounds	High assists	Location Attendance	Record
14	February 13	@ GhostHawks	W 102–88	Mohammad Al Bachir Gadiaga (28)	Marlon Johnson (17)	Mohammad Al Bachir Gadiaga (4); Cleanthony Early (4)	Chia Nan University of Pharmacy and Science Shao Tsung Gymnasium	9–5
15	February 19	@ HeroBears	W 115–94	Cleanthony Early (31)	Prince Ibeh (14)	Marlon Johnson (7)	Taipei Heping Basketball Gymnasium; 2,468	10–5
16	February 25	@ HeroBears	L 116–118	Mohammad Al Bachir Gadiaga (28); Marlon Johnson (28)	Marlon Johnson (10)	Hsieh Ya-Hsuan (8)	University of Taipei Tianmu Campus Gymnasium	10–6
17	February 27	@ GhostHawks	W 119–103	Mohammad Al Bachir Gadiaga (52)	Prince Ibeh (11)	Hsieh Ya-Hsuan (8)	Chia Nan University of Pharmacy and Science Shao Tsung Gymnasium	11–6

March : 2–3 (home: 2–1; road: 0–2)

Game	Date	Team	Score	High points	High rebounds	High assists	Location Attendance	Record
18	March 4	HeroBears	W 135–127 (OT)	Cleanthony Early (48)	Marlon Johnson (15)	Cleanthony Early (12)	Xinzhuang Gymnasium	12–6
19	March 5	Suns	L 105–113	Cleanthony Early (37)	Marlon Johnson (10)	Mohammad Al Bachir Gadiaga (5); Cleanthony Early (5)	Xinzhuang Gymnasium	12–7
20	March 6	Aquas	W 91–90	Marlon Johnson (31)	Aaron Epps (15)	Mohammad Al Bachir Gadiaga (7)	Xinzhuang Gymnasium	13–7
21	March 20	@ Aquas	L 98–100	Mohammad Al Bachir Gadiaga (29); Aaron Epps (29)	Marlon Johnson (13)	Hsieh Ya-Hsuan (7)	Kaohsiung Arena	13–8
22	March 26	@ Suns	L 97–116	Marlon Johnson (37)	Mohammad Al Bachir Gadiaga (7); Avery Scharer (7); Marlon Johnson (7)	Avery Scharer (7)	National Taiwan University of Sport Gymnasium; 4,877	13–9

April : 3–3 (home: 2–1; road: 1–2)

Game	Date	Team	Score	High points	High rebounds	High assists	Location Attendance	Record
—	April 2	@ Leopards	Postponed to May 7					
23	April 4	@ HeroBears	L 91–95	Kevin Allen (23)	Marlon Johnson (15)	Avery Scharer (5)	University of Taipei Tianmu Campus Gymnasium; No in-person attendance	13–10
24	April 9	Leopards	W 139–121	Aaron Epps (41)	Marlon Johnson (21)	Lin Wei-Han (16)	Xinzhuang Gymnasium	14–10
25	April 10	Aquas	L 92–123	Aaron Epps (26)	Aaron Epps (9)	Lin Wei-Han (6)	Xinzhuang Gymnasium	14–11
26	April 16	@ Suns	L 99–109	Lin Ping-Sheng (28)	Aaron Epps (13)	Lin Wei-Han (12)	National Taiwan University of Sport Gymnasium	14–12
27	April 24	@ Leopards	W 132–119	Marlon Johnson (30)	Marlon Johnson (16)	Avery Scharer (10)	Taipei Heping Basketball Gymnasium	15–12
28	April 30	GhostHawks	W 133–101	Kevin Allen (26)	Kevin Allen (12)	Avery Scharer (11)	Xinzhuang Gymnasium	16–12

May : 1–1 (home: 1–0; road: 0–1)

Game	Date	Team	Score	High points	High rebounds	High assists	Location Attendance	Record
29	May 1	Suns	W 110–106	Aaron Epps (27)	Aaron Epps (11)	Avery Scharer (15)	Xinzhuang Gymnasium	17–12
—	May 7	@ Leopards	Postponed to May 18					
30	May 18	@ Leopards	L 124–136	Aaron Epps (29)	Marlon Johnson (10); Aaron Epps (10)	Lin Wei-Han (8)	Taoyuan Arena	17–13

Color： Win Lose Postponed
Schedule

=== Regular season note ===
- Due to the COVID-19 pandemic in Taiwan, the T1 League declared that the game on April 2 would be postponed to May 7.
- Due to the COVID-19 pandemic in Taiwan, the T1 League declared that the games at the University of Taipei Tianmu Campus Gymnasium would play behind closed doors from April 4 to 10.
- Because the Taoyuan Leopards could not reach the minimum player number, the T1 League declared that the game on May 7 would be postponed to May 18.

== Playoffs ==
=== Game log ===
2022 playoffs game log
Total: 1–2 (home: 1–0; road: 0–2)
Semifinals : 1–2 (home: 1–0; road: 0–2)

Game	Date	Team	Score	High points	High rebounds	High assists	Location Attendance	Series
1	May 24	@ Suns	L 96–102	Hsieh Ya-Hsuan (20)	Kevin Allen (12)	Lin Wei-Han (6)	National Taiwan University of Sport Gymnasium	0–1
2	May 26	Suns	W 118–96	Marlon Johnson (31)	Marlon Johnson (17); Aaron Epps (17)	Lin Wei-Han (7)	Xinzhuang Gymnasium	1–1
3	May 28	@ Suns	L 75–80	Hsieh Ya-Hsuan (23)	Marlon Johnson (12)	Lin Wei-Han (4)	National Taiwan University of Sport Gymnasium	1–2

Color： Win Lose
Schedule

== Player statistics ==
Legend
GP	Games played	MPG	Minutes per game	2P%	2-point field goal percentage
3P%	3-point field goal percentage	FT%	Free throw percentage	RPG	Rebounds per game
APG	Assists per game	SPG	Steals per game	BPG	Blocks per game
PPG	Points per game		Led the league

=== Regular season ===
Player	GP	MPG	PPG	2P%	3P%	FT%	RPG	APG	SPG	BPG
Mohammad Al Bachir Gadiaga	25	35:35	20.7	54.5%	31.7%	72.4%	6.5	3.6	1.6	0.5
Prince Ibeh^{‡}	15	24:34	7.9	48.6%	0.0%	28.3%	7.5	0.9	0.8	2.5
Avery Scharer^{≠}	9	28:31	14.7	58.8%	36.4%	76.9%	5.7	6.8	1.9	0.1
Lin Ping-Sheng	24	32:24	13.2	61.4%	34.5%	68.8%	3.6	2.3	3.0	0.0
Liu Min-Yan	4	1:55	3.3	66.7%	100.0%	75.0%	0.3	0.5	0.0	0.0
Lee Hsueh-Lin	5	8:50	0.4	33.3%	0.0%	0.0%	0.4	0.6	0.2	0.0
Wei Chia-Hao	21	14:39	2.7	38.1%	30.6%	72.7%	1.6	1.8	1.6	0.2
Tung Fang Yi-Kang	5	5:53	2.6	62.5%	20.0%	0.0%	1.4	0.0	0.4	0.0
Hsieh Ya-Hsuan	29	26:21	11.0	55.0%	38.4%	71.4%	2.8	2.4	1.8	0.1
Zhou Cheng-Rui	6	5:02	1.7	40.0%	0.0%	75.0%	1.0	0.0	0.3	0.0
Jonah Morrison	25	14:40	3.3	48.9%	18.8%	71.4%	2.6	1.4	0.4	0.2
Marlon Johnson	30	37:09	18.1	46.1%	29.8%	74.8%	11.4	3.3	2.1	0.9
Kevin Allen^{≠}	6	24:32	15.5	60.3%	14.3%	51.9%	8.0	1.3	1.3	0.5
Lin Wei-Han^{≠}	8	31:57	8.6	50.0%	26.4%	60.0%	3.4	7.8	1.0	0.0
Aaron Epps^{≠}	11	31:21	20.0	51.8%	38.8%	76.0%	9.5	1.1	1.2	1.0
Cleanthony Early^{‡}	12	28:30	27.6	55.3%	28.3%	83.1%	8.9	4.8	0.8	0.8
Liu Weir-Chern	23	8:27	2.3	47.1%	29.7%	66.7%	0.8	0.2	0.5	0.0
Chanatip Jakrawan^{‡}	20	23:23	5.5	47.7%	33.3%	64.1%	5.0	1.0	0.2	0.8
Lu Chi-Erh^{‡}	21	25:42	6.5	53.8%	22.2%	77.8%	4.0	1.3	0.8	0.0

^{‡} Left during the season
^{≠} Acquired during the season

=== Semifinals ===
Player	GP	MPG	PPG	2P%	3P%	FT%	RPG	APG	SPG	BPG
Mohammad Al Bachir Gadiaga	3	18:13	10.0	44.4%	44.4%	66.7%	4.3	2.0	1.3	0.0
Avery Scharer	3	25:29	4.7	25.0%	0.0%	57.1%	7.0	3.7	1.0	0.3
Lin Ping-Sheng	3	34:43	14.7	50.0%	31.6%	80.0%	3.7	1.3	2.0	0.0
Liu Min-Yan	Did not play									
Lee Hsueh-Lin	Did not play									
Wei Chia-Hao	1	4:33	2.0	100.0%	0.0%	0.0%	0.0	1.0	1.0	0.0
Tung Fang Yi-Kang	Did not play									
Hsieh Ya-Hsuan	3	31:42	16.7	57.1%	40.0%	100.0%	2.7	1.3	1.7	0.0
Zhou Cheng-Rui	1	4:33	0.0	0.0%	0.0%	0.0%	0.0	0.0	0.0	0.0
Jonah Morrison	3	16:48	5.3	71.4%	40.0%	0.0%	1.7	1.0	0.3	0.3
Marlon Johnson	3	38:36	18.7	46.9%	11.1%	70.0%	12.0	2.0	2.0	0.3
Kevin Allen	3	14:13	7.0	50.0%	0.0%	83.3%	6.0	0.0	0.0	0.3
Lin Wei-Han	3	28:39	7.7	27.3%	27.8%	100.0%	5.0	5.7	2.3	0.0
Aaron Epps	3	24:50	10.0	47.4%	42.9%	100.0%	8.0	0.3	1.3	1.3
Liu Weir-Chern	2	5:31	1.5	0.0%	50.0%	0.0%	0.0	0.5	1.0	0.0

- Reference：

== Transactions ==
=== Overview ===
Players added

Via draft

- Mohammad Al Bachir Gadiaga
- Hsieh Ya-Hsuan
- Liu Min-Yan
- Tung Fang Yi-Kang
- Wei Chia-Hao
- Zhou Cheng-Rui

Via free agency

- Kevin Allen
- Cleanthony Early
- Aaron Epps
- Prince Ibeh
- Chanatip Jakrawan
- Marlon Johnson
- Lee Hsueh-Lin
- Lin Ping-Sheng
- Lin Wei-Han
- Liu Weir-Chern
- Lu Chi-Erh
- Jonah Morrison
- Avery Scharer
Players lost

Via trade

- Lu Chi-Erh

Via free agency

- Prince Ibeh

Waived

- Cleanthony Early
- Chanatip Jakrawan

=== Trades ===
Date	Trade		Ref.
August 4, 2021	To New Taipei CTBC DEA: 2021 Aquas' first-round pick	To Kaohsiung Aquas: Cash considerations	
March 19, 2022	To New Taipei CTBC DEA: Cash considerations	To Tainan TSG GhostHawks: Lu Chi-Erh	

=== Free agency ===
==== Additions ====
Date	Player	Contract terms	Former team	Ref.
August 5, 2021	Lu Chi-Erh	—N/a	(Taiwan) Yulon Luxgen Dinos	
August 6, 2021	Liu Weir-Chern	—N/a	Bank of Taiwan	
August 11, 2021	Wei Chia-Hao	—N/a	(Taiwan) FJU	
August 13, 2021	Tung Fang Yi-Kang	—N/a	(Taiwan) NYCU	
August 16, 2021	Liu Min-Yan	—N/a	(Taiwan) NKNU	
August 18, 2021	Zhou Cheng-Rui	—N/a	(Taiwan) CCU	
August 24, 2021	Hsieh Ya-Hsuan	2+1-year contract, worth unknown	(Taiwan) UCH	
August 26, 2021	Mohammad Al Bachir Gadiaga	3+2-year contract, worth unknown	(Taiwan) SHU	
August 29, 2021	Lee Hsueh-Lin	2-year contract, worth unknown	(Taiwan) Formosa Dreamers	
September 24, 2021	Lin Ping-Sheng	2-year contract, worth unknown	(China) Shaanxi Wolves	
September 30, 2021	Marlon Johnson	—N/a	(Canada) Edmonton Stingers	
October 6, 2021	Chanatip Jakrawan	—N/a	(Thailand) Hi-Tech Bangkok City	
October 14, 2021	Prince Ibeh	—N/a	(Uruguay) Club Atlético Aguada	
November 2, 2021	Jonah Morrison	—N/a	(Taiwan) Formosa Taishin Dreamers	
November 9, 2021	Cleanthony Early	—N/a	(France) Antibes Sharks	
February 12, 2022	Aaron Epps	—N/a	(Italy) Agribertocchi Orzinuovi	
March 17, 2022	Avery Scharer	—N/a	(Thailand) Dunkin' Raptors	
March 18, 2022	Kevin Allen	—N/a	(Romania) CSM Târgu Jiu	
March 18, 2022	Lin Wei-Han	3-year contract, worth about NT$20 million	(China) Qingdao Eagles	

==== Subtractions ====
Date	Player	Reason	New team	Ref.
March 2, 2022	Prince Ibeh	Contract expired	(Uruguay) Club Trouville	
April 10, 2022	Chanatip Jakrawan	Join the national team	(Thailand) Hitech Titans	
April 11, 2022	Cleanthony Early	Contract terminated	(South Africa) Cape Town Tigers	

== Awards ==
=== Yearly awards ===
Recipient	Award	Ref.
Wei Chia-Hao	Most Famous Player of the Year	
New Taipei CTBC DEA	Best Home-Court of the Year	
Lin Ping-Sheng	Steals Leader	
Lin Ping-Sheng	Defensive Player of the Year	
Lin Ping-Sheng	All-Defensive First Team	
Mohammad Al Bachir Gadiaga	Rookie of the Year	
Mohammad Al Bachir Gadiaga	All-T1 League First Team	

=== MVP of the Month ===
Month	Recipient	Award	Ref.
January	Mohammad Al Bachir Gadiaga	January MVP of the Month	
April & May	Lin Ping-Sheng	April & May MVP of the Month	
