= 2022 T1 League playoffs =

Taiwanese basketball tournament

Tournament details
- Dates: May 22 – June 4, 2022
- Season: 2021–22
- Teams: 5

Final positions
- Champions: Kaohsiung Aquas (1st title)
- Runners-up: Taichung Wagor Suns
- Semifinalists: New Taipei CTBC DEA; TaiwanBeer HeroBears

The 2022 T1 League playoffs was the postseason tournament of the T1 League's 2021–22 season. The play-in series was played on May 22. The semifinals series started on May 24 and ended on May 28. The finals series started on May 31 and ended on June 4. On June 4, the Kaohsiung Aquas defeated the Taichung Wagor Suns, 3–0, winning the 2021–22 season championship.

== Format ==
Five teams participated in the playoffs. The top three teams, based on winning percentage of regular season, directly qualified for the semifinals. The fourth and fifth seeds played the best-of-three play-in series, which was in a 1-1 format. The fourth seed was awarded a one-win advantage. The winner of the play-in series and the top three seeds played the best-of-five semifinals series. The winners of the semifinals series played the best-of-seven finals series. The semifinals series changed to a best-of-three series, which was in a 1-1-1 format. The finals series changed to a best-of-five series, in a 2-2-1 format, due to the COVID-19 pandemic in Taiwan.

== Playoff qualifying ==
On April 17, 2022, the Kaohsiung Aquas clinched the regular season title. On May 18, the Taoyuan Leopards became the first team to qualify the play-in series. On May 19, the New Taipei CTBC DEA became the final team to secure a direct berth in the semifinals bracket, qualifying as the third seed and relegating the TaiwanBeer HeroBears to the play-in series. On May 22, the TaiwanBeer HeroBears won the play-in series and advanced to the semifinals bracket.

Seed	Team	Record	Clinched		
Seed	Team	Record	Play-in berth	Semifinals berth	Best record in T1
1	Kaohsiung Aquas	23–7	—	April 10	April 17
2	Taichung Wagor Suns	20–10	—	April 24	—
3	New Taipei CTBC DEA	17–13	—	May 19	—
4	TaiwanBeer HeroBears	16–14	May 19	May 22	—
5	Taoyuan Leopards	8–22	May 18	—	—

== Bracket ==
Play-in
4	**TaiwanBeer HeroBears**	**2**
5	Taoyuan Leopards	0

Semifinals
1	**Kaohsiung Aquas**	**2**
4	TaiwanBeer HeroBears	0
2	**Taichung Wagor Suns**	**2**
3	New Taipei CTBC DEA	1

Finals
1	**Kaohsiung Aquas**	**3**
2	Taichung Wagor Suns	0

Bold: Series winner
Italic: Team with home-court advantage

== Play-in: (4) TaiwanBeer HeroBears vs. (5) Taoyuan Leopards ==
Eleven Sports
ELTA TV

May 22, 2022
14:00 (UTC+8)

boxscore

**TaiwanBeer HeroBears**	**128**–110	Taoyuan Leopards
Scoring by quarter: **29**–28, **34**–31, **35**–31, **30**–20
Pts: Lamb, Stone 31; Rebs: Deguara 10; Asts: Chiang Yu-An 12		Pts: Williams 47; Rebs: Williams 9 Asts: Williams 6
**HeroBears wins series, 2–0**

Taoyuan Arena, Taoyuan City
Referees: Ho Chang-Jen, Chen Ying-Cheng, Huang Yung-Chu

Regular-season series
Tied 3–3 in the regular-season series

December 12, 2021

boxscore

Taoyuan Leopards	93–**102**	**TaiwanBeer HeroBears**

University of Taipei Tianmu Campus Gymnasium, Taipei City

March 6, 2022

boxscore

Taoyuan Leopards	113–**115**	**TaiwanBeer HeroBears**

University of Taipei Tianmu Campus Gymnasium, Taipei City

March 12, 2022

boxscore

TaiwanBeer HeroBears	96–**101**	**Taoyuan Leopards**

Chung Yuan Christian University Gymnasium, Taoyuan City

April 5, 2022

boxscore

Taoyuan Leopards	88–**120**	**TaiwanBeer HeroBears**

University of Taipei Tianmu Campus Gymnasium, Taipei City

April 23, 2022

boxscore

TaiwanBeer HeroBears	134–**135**	**Taoyuan Leopards**

Taipei Heping Basketball Gymnasium, Taipei City

May 19, 2022

boxscore

TaiwanBeer HeroBears	104–**110**	**Taoyuan Leopards**

Taoyuan Arena, Taoyuan City

This was the first playoff meeting between these two teams.

== Semifinals ==
=== (1) Kaohsiung Aquas vs. (4) TaiwanBeer HeroBears ===
Eleven Sports
ELTA TV

May 25, 2022
19:00 (UTC+8)

boxscore

TaiwanBeer HeroBears	91–**114**	**Kaohsiung Aquas**
Scoring by quarter: **35**–32, **18**–14, 19–**33**, 19–**35**
Pts: Stone 29; Rebs: Deguara 8 Asts: Chiang Yu-An 5		Pts: Kupšas 24; Rebs: Alexander 10; Asts: Brickman 8
**Aquas leads series, 1–0**

Fengshan Arena, Kaohsiung City
Referees: Chen Ying-Cheng, Wu Chien-Wu, Lai Chien-Hao

Eleven Sports
ELTA TV

May 27, 2022
19:00 (UTC+8)

boxscore

**Kaohsiung Aquas**	**99**–93	TaiwanBeer HeroBears
Scoring by quarter: **27**–16, 21–**22**, 30–**35**, **21**–20
Pts: Kupšas 27; Rebs: Alexander 9 Asts: Brickman 14		Pts: Stone 31; Rebs: Stone 18; Asts: Chiang Yu-An 5
**Aquas wins series, 2–0**

University of Taipei Tianmu Campus Gymnasium, Taipei City
Referees: Yu Jung, Su Yu-Yen, Lin Chien-Hung

Regular-season series
Tied 3–3 in the regular-season series

November 27, 2021

boxscore

**Kaohsiung Aquas**	**107**–106	TaiwanBeer HeroBears

University of Taipei Tianmu Campus Gymnasium, Taipei City

December 31, 2021

boxscore

TaiwanBeer HeroBears	113–**114**	**Kaohsiung Aquas**

Kaohsiung Arena, Kaohsiung City

January 30, 2022

boxscore

**TaiwanBeer HeroBears**	**100**–94	Kaohsiung Aquas

Kaohsiung Arena, Kaohsiung City

February 26, 2022

boxscore

Kaohsiung Aquas	125–**131** (OT)	**TaiwanBeer HeroBears**

University of Taipei Tianmu Campus Gymnasium, Taipei City

March 26, 2022

boxscore

**TaiwanBeer HeroBears**	**99**–92	Kaohsiung Aquas

Kaohsiung Arena, Kaohsiung City

May 20, 2022

boxscore

**Kaohsiung Aquas**	**124**–107	TaiwanBeer HeroBears

University of Taipei Tianmu Campus Gymnasium, Taipei City

This was the first playoff meeting between these two teams.

=== (2) Taichung Wagor Suns vs. (3) New Taipei CTBC DEA ===
Eleven Sports
ELTA TV

May 24, 2022
19:00 (UTC+8)

boxscore

New Taipei CTBC DEA	96–**102**	**Taichung Wagor Suns**
Scoring by quarter: 15–**28**, **29**–20, 26–**28**, 26–26
Pts: Hsieh Ya-Hsuan 20; Rebs: Allen 12; Asts: Lin Wei-Han 6		Pts: Sakakini 33; Rebs: Sakakini, Tucker 10; Asts: Ting Sheng-Ju 6
**Suns leads series, 1–0**

National Taiwan University of Sport Gymnasium, Taichung City
Referees: Yu Jung, Lin Chien-Hung, Su Yu-Yen

Eleven Sports
ELTA TV

May 26, 2022
19:00 (UTC+8)

boxscore

Taichung Wagor Suns	96–**118**	**New Taipei CTBC DEA**
Scoring by quarter: 25–**30**, 26–26, 22–**33**, 23–**29**
Pts: Sakakini 25; Rebs: Sakakini 14; Asts: Sakakini 6		Pts: Johnson 31; Rebs: Johnson, Epps 17; Asts: Lin Wei-Han 7
**Series tied, 1–1**

Xinzhuang Gymnasium, New Taipei City
Referees: Wu Chien-Wu, Ho Chang-Jen, Lan Wei-Hsiung

Eleven Sports
ELTA TV

May 28, 2022
14:00 (UTC+8)

boxscore

New Taipei CTBC DEA	75–**80**	**Taichung Wagor Suns**
Scoring by quarter: 11–**24**, **25**–16, **22**–16, 17–**24**
Pts: Hsieh Ya-Hsuan 23; Rebs: Johnson 12; Asts: Lin Wei-Han 4		Pts: Sakakini, Tucker 17; Rebs: Tucker 13; Asts: Sakakini 5
**Suns wins series, 2–1**

National Taiwan University of Sport Gymnasium, Taichung City
Referees: Chen Ying-Cheng, Wei Sheng-Hsuan, Hsieh Shang-Chien

Regular-season series
The Suns won 4–2 in the regular-season series

January 1, 2022

boxscore

**New Taipei CTBC DEA**	**95**–85	Taichung Wagor Suns

National Taiwan University of Sport Gymnasium, Taichung City

January 23, 2022

boxscore

**Taichung Wagor Suns**	**99**–92	New Taipei CTBC DEA

Xinzhuang Gymnasium, New Taipei City

March 5, 2022

boxscore

**Taichung Wagor Suns**	**113**–105 (OT)	New Taipei CTBC DEA

Xinzhuang Gymnasium, New Taipei City

March 26, 2022

boxscore

New Taipei CTBC DEA	97–**116**	**Taichung Wagor Suns**

National Taiwan University of Sport Gymnasium, Taichung City

April 16, 2022

boxscore

New Taipei CTBC DEA	99–**109**	**Taichung Wagor Suns**

National Taiwan University of Sport Gymnasium, Taichung City

May 1, 2022

boxscore

Taichung Wagor Suns	106–**110**	**New Taipei CTBC DEA**

Xinzhuang Gymnasium, New Taipei City

This was the first playoff meeting between these two teams.

== T1 League Finals: (1) Kaohsiung Aquas vs. (2) Taichung Wagor Suns ==
Eleven Sports
ELTA TV

May 31, 2022
19:00 (UTC+8)

boxscore

Taichung Wagor Suns	99–**101**	**Kaohsiung Aquas**
Scoring by quarter: 24–**28**, 30–**32**, 22–**33**, **23**–8
Pts: Tucker 33; Rebs: Geramipoor 12; Asts: Tucker 9		Pts: Hu Long-Mao 26; Rebs: Kupšas 10; Asts: Brickman 14
**Aquas leads series, 1–0**

Fengshan Arena, Kaohsiung
Referees: Yu Jung, Ho Chang-Jen, Su Yu-Yen

Eleven Sports
ELTA TV

June 2, 2022
19:00 (UTC+8)

boxscore

Taichung Wagor Suns	82–**112**	**Kaohsiung Aquas**
Scoring by quarter: 15–**33**, **29**–26, 22–**30**, 16–**23**
Pts: Sakakini, Su Yi-Chin 19; Rebs: Sakakini 10; Asts: Tucker 7		Pts: Hu Long-Mao 38; Rebs: Alexander 8 Asts: Brickman 13
**Aquas leads series, 2–0**

Fengshan Arena, Kaohsiung
Referees: Chen Ying-Cheng, Wei Sheng-Hsuan, Lin Chien-Hung

Eleven Sports
ELTA TV

June 4, 2022
14:00(UTC+8)

boxscore

**Kaohsiung Aquas**	**103**–100	Taichung Wagor Suns
Scoring by quarter: **23**–22, **31**–27, 23–**30**, **26**–21
Pts: Brickman 23; Rebs: Kupšas 11; Asts: Brickman 9		Pts: Tucker 34; Rebs: Geramipoor 8 Asts: Tucker, Su Yi-Chin 3
**Aquas wins series, 3–0**

National Taiwan University of Sport Gymnasium, Taichung
Referees: Wu Chien-Wu, Yu Jung, Chen Ying-Cheng

Regular-season series
The Aquas won 4–2 in the regular-season series

December 19, 2021

boxscore

Taichung Wagor Suns	81–**92**	**Kaohsiung Aquas**

Kaohsiung Arena, Kaohsiung

December 26, 2021

boxscore

Kaohsiung Aquas	88–**93**	**Taichung Wagor Suns**

National Taiwan University of Sport Gymnasium, Taichung

January 28, 2022

boxscore

**Taichung Wagor Suns**	**104**–89	Kaohsiung Aquas

Kaohsiung Arena, Kaohsiung

February 12, 2022

boxscore

Taichung Wagor Suns	71–**87**	**Kaohsiung Aquas**

Kaohsiung Arena, Kaohsiung

February 28, 2022

boxscore

**Kaohsiung Aquas**	**122**–113 (OT)	Taichung Wagor Suns

National Taiwan University of Sport Gymnasium, Taichung

March 13, 2022

boxscore

**Kaohsiung Aquas**	**98**–81	Taichung Wagor Suns

National Taiwan University of Sport Gymnasium, Taichung

This was the first playoff meeting between these two teams.

== Statistical leaders ==
Category	Game high			Average			
Category	Player	Team	High	Player	Team	Avg.	GP
Points	Troy Williams	Taoyuan Leopards	47	Troy Williams	Taoyuan Leopards	47.0	1
Rebounds	Diamond Stone	TaiwanBeer HeroBears	18	Marlon Johnson	New Taipei CTBC DEA	12.0	3
Assists	Jason Brickman	Kaohsiung Aquas	14	Jason Brickman	Kaohsiung Aquas	11.6	5
Steals	Marlon Johnson; Tyler Lamb	New Taipei CTBC DEA; TaiwanBeer HeroBears	5	Troy Williams	Taoyuan Leopards	3.0	1
Blocks	Diamond Stone; Mindaugas Kupšas	TaiwanBeer HeroBears; Kaohsiung Aquas	3	Lo Chen-Feng	Taoyuan Leopards	2.0	1
