= 2021–22 Taichung Wagor Suns season =

Taiwanese professional basketball season

- President: Sun Tzu-Chuan
- General Manager: Wang Wei-Chieh
- Head Coach: Iurgi Caminos
- Arena: National Taiwan University of Sport Gymnasium

T1 League results
- Record: 20–10 (66.7%)
- Place: 2nd
- Playoffs finish: Finals (lost to Aquas, 0–3)

Player records
- Points: Sani Sakakini 24.8
- Rebounds: Sani Sakakini 14.1
- Assists: Anthony Tucker 5.8

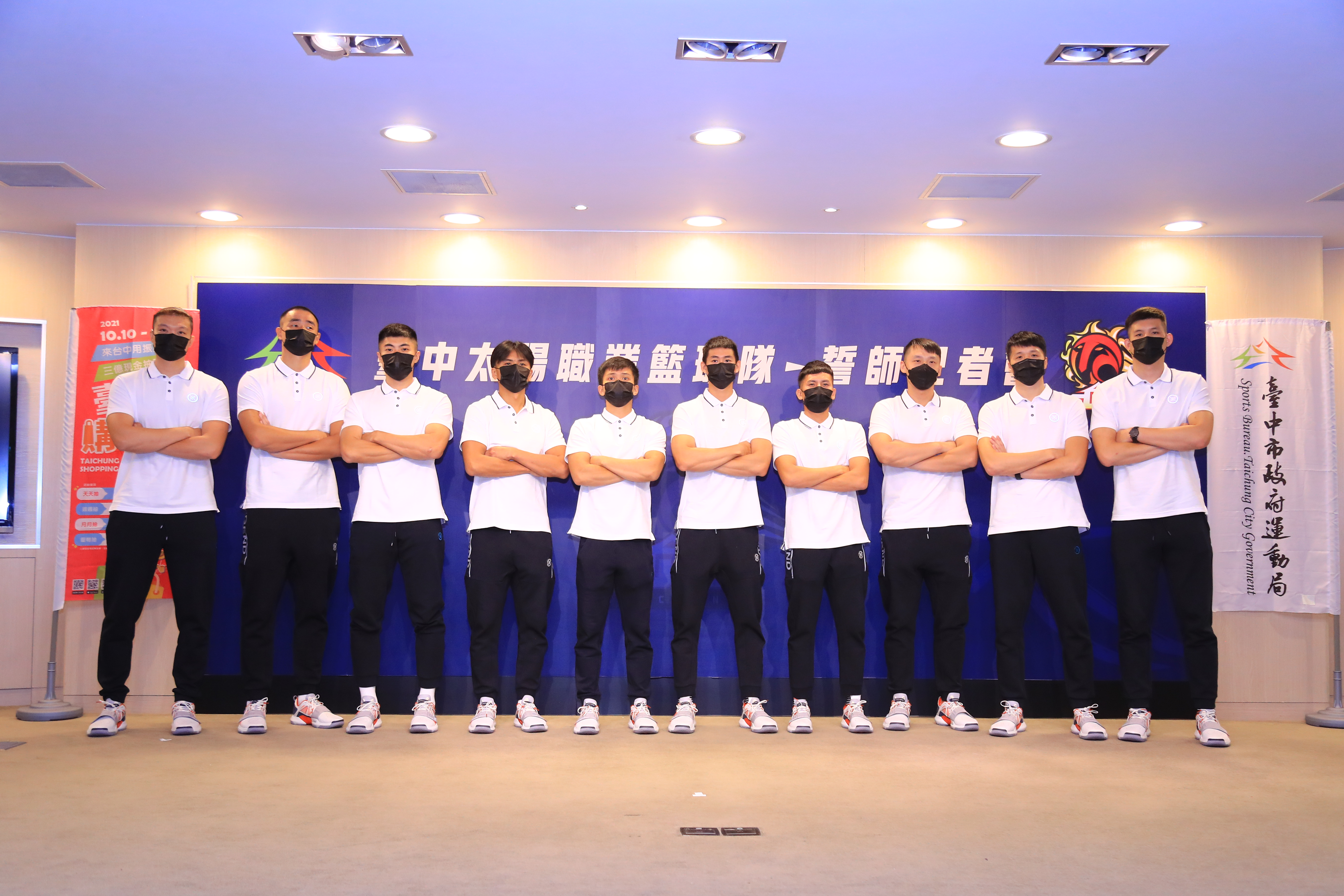
Taichung Suns held the preseason press conference on October 5, 2021.

The 2021–22 Taichung Wagor Suns season was the franchise's first season, its first season in the T1 League.

The Suns were coached by Iurgi Caminos in his first year as their head coach. On June 19, 2021, the Suns hired Wang Wei-Chieh as their general manager.

== Draft ==
Round	Player	Position(s)	School / club team
1	Yu Chu-Hsiang	Power forward / center	SHU
2	Yang Cheng-Han	Shooting guard	FJU

- Reference：

== Roster ==
2021–22 Taichung Wagor Suns roster
Players
Coaches

Pos.	No.	Nat.	Name	Ht.	Wt.	Age	From
PG	0	(United States)	Anthony Tucker (I)	1.93 m (6 ft 4 in)	93 kg (205 lb)	32 – 2 September 1989	Minnesota
SG	1	(Taiwan)	Yang Cheng-Han	1.86 m (6 ft 1 in)	77 kg (170 lb)	22 – 10 October 1999	FJU
PG	3	(Taiwan)	Ting Sheng-Ju	1.74 m (5 ft 9 in)	70 kg (154 lb)	23 – 22 August 1998	St. Francis
PG	4	(Taiwan)	Kao Meng-Wei	1.75 m (5 ft 9 in)	70 kg (154 lb)	25 – 13 September 1996	NTCUST
PG	5	(Taiwan)	Li Ping-Hung	1.83 m (6 ft 0 in)	80 kg (176 lb)	32 – 3 November 1989	NTNU
PG	7	(Taiwan)	Chou Tzu-Hua	1.83 m (6 ft 0 in)	92 kg (203 lb)	34 – 4 October 1987	FJU
SF	8	(Taiwan)	Chen Wen-Hung	1.88 m (6 ft 2 in)	80 kg (176 lb)	30 – 14 July 1991	NTSU
PF	9	(Philippines)	Niño Canaleta (AI)	1.98 m (6 ft 6 in)	91 kg (201 lb)	40 – 12 February 1982	UE
SF	12	(Taiwan)	Chiu Po-Chang	1.89 m (6 ft 2 in)	91 kg (201 lb)	26 – 2 November 1995	NTUA
PF	13	(Palestine)	Sani Sakakini (I)	2.04 m (6 ft 8 in)	108 kg (238 lb)	33 – 19 August 1988	JUST
SG	15	(Philippines) (Australia)	Jordan Heading (AI)	1.88 m (6 ft 2 in)	86 kg (190 lb)	26 – 30 January 1996	California Baptist
C	18	(Taiwan)	Sun Szu-Yao	2.05 m (6 ft 9 in)	100 kg (220 lb)	24 – 3 October 1997	NYIT
SF	23	(Taiwan)	Chen Ching-Huan (C)	1.90 m (6 ft 3 in)	84 kg (185 lb)	36 – 3 February 1986	FJU
PF	30	(United States)	Julian Wright (I)	2.03 m (6 ft 8 in)	107 kg (236 lb)	35 – 20 May 1987	Kansas
C	32	(United Kingdom) (Iran)	Aaron Geramipoor (I)	2.13 m (7 ft 0 in)	123 kg (271 lb)	29 – 11 September 1992	Seton Hall
PF	41	(Taiwan)	Su Yi-Chin	2.00 m (6 ft 7 in)	96 kg (212 lb)	28 – 29 December 1993	MDU
PF	68	(Taiwan)	Yu Chu-Hsiang	2.00 m (6 ft 7 in)	88 kg (194 lb)	22 – 16 June 1999	SHU

Head coach

- (Spain) Iurgi Caminos

Assistant coach(es)

- (Spain) Alberto Garcia
- (Taiwan) Chou Ying-Chou

Strength & conditioning coach(es)

- (Taiwan) Hsieh Meng-Hung

Team manager

- (Taiwan) Wang Wei-Chieh

Legend

- (C) Team captain
- (I) Import player
- (AI) Asian import player
- Injured

- Roster
Updated: March 23, 2022

== Preseason ==
=== Game log ===
2021 preseason game log
Total: 0–1 (home: 0–1; road: 0–0)
Preseason : 0–1 (home: 0–1; road: 0–0)

Game	Date	Team	Score	High points	High rebounds	High assists	Location Attendance	Record
1	November 13	HeroBears	L 74–88	Ting Sheng-Ju (13)	Sun Szu-Yao (16)	Ting Sheng-Ju (5)	Kaohsiung Arena; 3,288	0–1

Color： Win Lose
Schedule

== Regular season ==
=== Standings ===
Pos	Team	Pld	W	L	PCT	GB	Qualification
1	Kaohsiung Aquas	30	23	7	.767	—	Advance to semifinals
2	Taichung Wagor Suns	30	20	10	.667	3	Advance to semifinals
3	New Taipei CTBC DEA	30	17	13	.567	6	Advance to semifinals
4	TaiwanBeer HeroBears	30	16	14	.533	7	Advance to play-in
5	Taoyuan Leopards	30	8	22	.267	15	Advance to play-in
6	Tainan TSG GhostHawks	30	6	24	.200	17	

Source: T1 League

=== Game log ===
2021–22 regular season game log
Total: 20–10 (home: 10–5; road: 10–5)
December : 2–2 (home: 2–0; road: 0–2)

Game	Date	Team	Score	High points	High rebounds	High assists	Location Attendance	Record
1	December 11	@ HeroBears	L 111–117	Sani Sakakini (40)	Sani Sakakini (16)	Sani Sakakini (7)	University of Taipei Tianmu Campus Gymnasium	0–1
2	December 19	@ Aquas	L 81–92	Sani Sakakini (24)	Alonzo Gee (22)	Alonzo Gee (5)	Kaohsiung Arena; 3,507	0–2
3	December 25	HeroBears	W 110–102	Sani Sakakini (29)	Sani Sakakini (9)	Ting Sheng-Ju (5)	National Taiwan University of Sport Gymnasium	1–2
4	December 26	Aquas	W 93–88	Sani Sakakini (31)	Sani Sakakini (10)	Ting Sheng-Ju (5)	National Taiwan University of Sport Gymnasium	2–2

January : 5–3 (home: 1–3; road: 4–0)

Game	Date	Team	Score	High points	High rebounds	High assists	Location Attendance	Record
5	January 1	DEA	L 85–95	Jordan Heading (17)	Sani Sakakini (13)	Sani Sakakini (6)	National Taiwan University of Sport Gymnasium	2–3
6	January 2	HeroBears	L 88–95	Sani Sakakini (23)	Alonzo Gee (9); Sani Sakakini (9)	Alonzo Gee (4); Julian Wright (4)	National Taiwan University of Sport Gymnasium	2–4
7	January 8	HeroBears	L 84–91	Jordan Heading (25)	Sani Sakakini (21)	Ting Sheng-Ju (6); Sani Sakakini (6); Julian Wright (6)	National Taiwan University of Sport Gymnasium	2–5
8	January 9	Leopards	W 101–74	Sani Sakakini (23)	Julian Wright (12)	Ting Sheng-Ju (6)	National Taiwan University of Sport Gymnasium	3–5
9	January 16	@ Leopards	W 119–115	Sani Sakakini (35)	Sani Sakakini (20)	Ting Sheng-Ju (7)	Chung Yuan Christian University Gymnasium; No in-person attendance	4–5
10	January 23	@ DEA	W 99–92	Sani Sakakini (23); Jordan Heading (23)	Sani Sakakini (17)	Ting Sheng-Ju (7)	Xinzhuang Gymnasium	5–5
11	January 28	@ Aquas	W 104–89	Sani Sakakini (31)	Sani Sakakini (15)	Sani Sakakini (5)	Kaohsiung Arena; No in-person attendance	6–5
12	January 30	@ GhostHawks	W 98–95	Jordan Heading (28)	Sani Sakakini (11)	Ting Sheng-Ju (7)	Chia Nan University of Pharmacy and Science Shao Tsung Gymnasium	7–5

February : 2–2 (home: 1–1; road: 1–1)

Game	Date	Team	Score	High points	High rebounds	High assists	Location Attendance	Record
—	February 6	@ Leopards	Postponed to April 29					
13	February 12	@ Aquas	L 71–87	Sani Sakakini (24)	Sani Sakakini (22)	Ting Sheng-Ju (4); Julian Wright (4)	Kaohsiung Arena	7–6
14	February 20	@ HeroBears	W 115–95	Jordan Heading (36)	Sani Sakakini (12)	Anthony Tucker (7)	Taipei Heping Basketball Gymnasium	8–6
15	February 27	Leopards	W 108–102	Sani Sakakini (29)	Sani Sakakini (14)	Anthony Tucker (5)	National Taiwan University of Sport Gymnasium	9–6
16	February 28	Aquas	L 113–122 (OT)	Jordan Heading (36)	Sun Szu-Yao (10)	Sani Sakakini (4)	National Taiwan University of Sport Gymnasium	9–7

March : 5–1 (home: 3–1; road: 2–0)

Game	Date	Team	Score	High points	High rebounds	High assists	Location Attendance	Record
17	March 5	@ DEA	W 113–105	Chen Ching-Huan (26)	Sani Sakakini (14)	Sani Sakakini (11)	Xinzhuang Gymnasium	10–7
18	March 12	GhostHawks	W 115–91	Sani Sakakini (26)	Sani Sakakini (16)	Anthony Tucker (6)	National Taiwan University of Sport Gymnasium	11–7
19	March 13	Aquas	L 81–98	Sani Sakakini (26)	Sani Sakakini (14)	Su Yi-Chin (5)	National Taiwan University of Sport Gymnasium; 4,678	11–8
20	March 19	@ GhostHawks	W 112–85	Chen Ching-Huan (32)	Sani Sakakini (17)	Sani Sakakini (10)	Chia Nan University of Pharmacy and Science Shao Tsung Gymnasium	12–8
21	March 26	DEA	W 116–97	Sani Sakakini (33)	Sani Sakakini (15)	Sani Sakakini (8)	National Taiwan University of Sport Gymnasium; 4,877	13–8
22	March 27	Leopards	W 98–93	Anthony Tucker (33)	Sani Sakakini (21)	Sani Sakakini (8)	National Taiwan University of Sport Gymnasium	14–8

April : 5–1 (home: 3–0; road: 2–1)

Game	Date	Team	Score	High points	High rebounds	High assists	Location Attendance	Record
23	April 2	GhostHawks	W 105–88	Jordan Heading (25)	Sani Sakakini (13)	Sani Sakakini (12)	National Taiwan University of Sport Gymnasium	15–8
—	April 3	@ Leopards	Postponed to May 8					
24	April 9	@ HeroBears	L 118–119 (OT)	Anthony Tucker (38)	Sani Sakakini (12)	Anthony Tucker (9)	University of Taipei Tianmu Campus Gymnasium; No in-person attendance	15–9
25	April 16	DEA	W 109–99	Sani Sakakini (25)	Sani Sakakini (13)	Anthony Tucker (10)	National Taiwan University of Sport Gymnasium	16–9
26	April 17	GhostHawks	W 126–101	Sani Sakakini (29)	Aaron Geramipoor (10)	Anthony Tucker (6)	National Taiwan University of Sport Gymnasium	17–9
27	April 24	@ GhostHawks	W 119–111	Jordan Heading (44)	Sani Sakakini (12); Su Yi-Chin (12)	Anthony Tucker (11)	Chia Nan University of Pharmacy and Science Shao Tsung Gymnasium	18–9
28	April 29	@ Leopards	W 112–97	Sani Sakakini (20)	Sani Sakakini (19)	Anthony Tucker (7)	Chung Yuan Christian University Gymnasium	19–9

May : 1–1 (home: 0–0; road: 1–1)

Game	Date	Team	Score	High points	High rebounds	High assists	Location Attendance	Record
29	May 1	@ DEA	L 106–110	Anthony Tucker (24)	Aaron Geramipoor (14)	Ting Sheng-Ju (5)	Xinzhuang Gymnasium	19–10
—	May 8	@ Leopards	Postponed to May 20					
30	May 20	@ Leopards	W 127–125 (OT)	Anthony Tucker (44)	Sani Sakakini (15)	Sani Sakakini (4); Anthony Tucker (4); Julian Wright (4)	Taoyuan Arena	20–10

Color： Win Lose Postponed
Schedule

=== Regular season note ===
- Due to the COVID-19 pandemic in Taoyuan, the Taoyuan City Government and Taoyuan Leopards declared that the games at the Chung Yuan Christian University Gymnasium would play behind closed doors from January 15 to 16.
- Due to the COVID-19 pandemic in Taiwan, the T1 League declared that the game on February 6 would be postponed to April 29. The games at the Kaohsiung Arena would play behind closed doors from January 28 to 30.
- Due to the COVID-19 pandemic in Taiwan, the T1 League declared that the game on April 3 would be postponed to May 8.
- Due to the COVID-19 pandemic in Taiwan, the T1 League declared that the games at the University of Taipei Tianmu Campus Gymnasium would play behind closed doors from April 4 to 10.
- Because the Taoyuan Leopards could not reach the minimum player number, the T1 League declared that the game on May 8 would be postponed to May 20.

== Playoffs ==
=== Game log ===
2022 playoffs game log
Total: 2–4 (home: 2–1; road: 0–3)
Semifinals : 2–1 (home: 2–0; road: 0–1)

Game	Date	Team	Score	High points	High rebounds	High assists	Location Attendance	Series
1	May 24	DEA	W 102–96	Sani Sakakini (33)	Sani Sakakini (10); Anthony Tucker (10)	Ting Sheng-Ju (6)	National Taiwan University of Sport Gymnasium	1–0
2	May 26	@ DEA	L 96–118	Sani Sakakini (25)	Sani Sakakini (14)	Sani Sakakini (6)	Xinzhuang Gymnasium	1–1
3	May 28	DEA	W 80–75	Sani Sakakini (17); Anthony Tucker (17)	Anthony Tucker (13)	Sani Sakakini (5)	National Taiwan University of Sport Gymnasium	2–1

Finals : 0–3 (home: 0–1; road: 0–2)

Game	Date	Team	Score	High points	High rebounds	High assists	Location Attendance	Series
1	May 31	@ Aquas	L 99–101	Anthony Tucker (33)	Aaron Geramipoor (12)	Anthony Tucker (9)	Fengshan Arena	0–1
2	June 2	@ Aquas	L 82–112	Sani Sakakini (19); Su Yi-Chin (19)	Sani Sakakini (10)	Anthony Tucker (7)	Fengshan Arena	0–2
3	June 4	Aquas	L 100–103	Anthony Tucker (34)	Aaron Geramipoor (8)	Anthony Tucker (3); Su Yi-Chin (3)	National Taiwan University of Sport Gymnasium	0–3

Color： Win Lose
Schedule

== Player statistics ==
Legend
GP	Games played	MPG	Minutes per game	2P%	2-point field goal percentage
3P%	3-point field goal percentage	FT%	Free throw percentage	RPG	Rebounds per game
APG	Assists per game	SPG	Steals per game	BPG	Blocks per game
PPG	Points per game		Led the league

=== Regular season ===
Player	GP	MPG	PPG	2P%	3P%	FT%	RPG	APG	SPG	BPG
Anthony Tucker^{≠}	18	31:38	20.7	61.9%	41.3%	80.9%	6.9	5.8	1.3	0.4
Yang Cheng-Han	11	8:10	1.3	31.3%	8.3%	25.0%	0.5	0.4	0.3	0.2
Ting Sheng-Ju	29	32:43	10.8	43.0%	34.4%	85.1%	3.6	3.7	1.1	0.1
Kao Meng-Wei	4	3:41	0.0	0.0%	0.0%	0.0%	0.3	0.3	0.0	0.0
Li Ping-Hung	28	11:40	2.5	43.1%	16.7%	72.7%	1.3	0.9	0.3	0.0
Alonzo Gee^{‡}	5	32:50	10.8	31.8%	27.3%	66.7%	8.0	3.4	2.4	0.0
Chou Tzu-Hua	9	9:19	1.4	33.3%	14.3%	80.0%	0.9	1.6	0.1	0.0
Chen Wen-Hung	29	18:19	4.1	52.4%	27.9%	44.4%	3.1	1.1	0.7	0.4
Niño Canaleta^{≠}	1	15:18	12.0	100.0%	66.7%	0.0%	3.0	0.0	1.0	0.0
Chiu Po-Chang	21	6:43	2.3	43.2%	18.2%	36.4%	1.2	0.1	0.2	0.1
Sani Sakakini	29	38:02	24.8	54.7%	33.3%	76.0%	14.1	5.0	1.6	0.7
Jordan Heading	29	31:59	19.9	53.7%	36.4%	76.1%	4.6	2.4	1.2	0.3
Sun Szu-Yao	29	7:49	1.7	48.0%	0.0%	28.6%	1.8	0.2	0.1	0.1
Chen Ching-Huan	30	30:55	10.0	57.1%	42.2%	66.7%	3.2	2.6	0.8	0.2
Julian Wright^{≠}	22	21:31	9.1	53.6%	24.3%	53.5%	7.0	2.9	1.1	0.8
Aaron Geramipoor^{≠}	6	21:56	12.8	57.9%	0.0%	61.1%	7.8	0.7	0.5	0.0
Su Yi-Chin	30	20:21	6.5	49.6%	22.4%	68.4%	3.9	1.5	0.5	0.4
Yu Chu-Hsiang	5	2:23	0.4	20.0%	0.0%	0.0%	0.0	0.0	0.0	0.0

^{‡} Left during the season
^{≠} Acquired during the season

=== Semifinals ===
Player	GP	MPG	PPG	2P%	3P%	FT%	RPG	APG	SPG	BPG
Anthony Tucker	3	32:58	21.7	42.3%	52.4%	83.3%	9.7	3.0	1.3	0.0
Yang Cheng-Han	Did not play									
Ting Sheng-Ju	3	34:28	7.0	33.3%	19.0%	75.0%	3.0	4.7	2.3	0.0
Kao Meng-Wei	Did not play									
Li Ping-Hung	2	6:44	0.5	0.0%	0.0%	50.0%	1.5	0.0	0.0	0.0
Chou Tzu-Hua	2	2:01	0.0	0.0%	0.0%	0.0%	0.5	0.0	0.0	0.0
Chen Wen-Hung	3	25:46	4.0	25.0%	21.4%	50.0%	3.7	0.7	1.3	0.0
Niño Canaleta	Did not play									
Chiu Po-Chang	2	7:55	3.0	50.0%	0.0%	0.0%	0.5	0.0	0.5	0.0
Sani Sakakini	3	35:03	25.0	53.1%	42.9%	73.7%	10.3	5.3	0.7	0.7
Jordan Heading	3	29:19	11.7	71.4%	25.0%	77.8%	2.7	2.0	1.3	0.0
Sun Szu-Yao	3	3:53	2.0	100.0%	0.0%	0.0%	0.7	0.0	0.0	0.0
Chen Ching-Huan	3	33:04	5.7	0.0%	23.8%	50.0%	5.3	2.0	0.3	0.0
Julian Wright	2	13:30	4.0	50.0%	0.0%	66.7%	5.0	2.5	0.5	1.0
Aaron Geramipoor	1	18:17	10.0	66.7%	0.0%	66.7%	7.0	0.0	0.0	1.0
Su Yi-Chin	3	18:47	7.3	50.0%	20.0%	50.0%	3.3	0.3	1.0	0.3
Yu Chu-Hsiang	1	1:24	0.0	0.0%	0.0%	0.0%	0.0	0.0	0.0	0.0

=== Finals ===
Player	GP	MPG	PPG	2P%	3P%	FT%	RPG	APG	SPG	BPG
Anthony Tucker	3	36:18	27.0	45.2%	43.3%	87.5%	7.0	6.3	2.7	0.7
Yang Cheng-Han	Did not play									
Ting Sheng-Ju	3	31:21	8.0	33.3%	40.0%	75.0%	1.3	3.0	1.3	0.0
Kao Meng-Wei	Did not play									
Li Ping-Hung	2	4:08	0.0	0.0%	0.0%	0.0%	0.5	0.0	0.0	0.0
Chou Tzu-Hua	Did not play									
Chen Wen-Hung	3	21:42	4.7	50.0%	36.4%	0.0%	1.7	0.3	0.3	0.3
Niño Canaleta	1	18:47	11.0	100.0%	60.0%	0.0%	1.0	1.0	0.0	0.0
Chiu Po-Chang	2	10:32	3.0	60.0%	0.0%	0.0%	0.5	0.5	0.5	0.0
Sani Sakakini	2	22:41	14.5	38.9%	0.0%	83.3%	8.0	2.0	0.5	0.5
Jordan Heading	2	24:43	5.0	37.5%	0.0%	100.0%	1.0	3.0	0.0	0.0
Sun Szu-Yao	3	10:44	3.3	83.3%	0.0%	0.0%	2.7	0.0	0.3	0.7
Chen Ching-Huan	3	29:15	3.3	50.0%	14.3%	60.0%	2.7	1.7	0.0	0.0
Julian Wright	1	12:05	2.0	50.0%	0.0%	0.0%	3.0	3.0	1.0	0.0
Aaron Geramipoor	3	30:25	15.3	70.0%	0.0%	57.1%	7.0	1.3	1.0	0.0
Su Yi-Chin	3	28:31	12.7	55.0%	33.3%	77.8%	5.7	2.0	0.7	0.7
Yu Chu-Hsiang	Did not play									

- Reference：

== Transactions ==
On January 8, 2022, Taichung Wagor Suns indicated that Alonzo Gee went back to the United States to take care of his grandmother.

On March 23, 2022, Donté Greene was not registered in the 2021–22 T1 League season final rosters.

=== Overview ===
Players added

Via draft

- Yang Cheng-Han
- Yu Chu-Hsiang

Via trade

- Chou Tzu-Hua

Via free agency

- Niño Canaleta
- Chen Ching-Huan
- Chen Wen-Hung
- Chiu Po-Chang
- Alonzo Gee
- Aaron Geramipoor
- Donté Greene
- Jordan Heading
- Kao Meng-Wei
- Li Ping-Hung
- Sani Sakakini
- Su Yi-Chin
- Sun Szu-Yao
- Ting Sheng-Ju
- Anthony Tucker
- Julian Wright
Players lost

Via free agency

- Donté Greene

=== Trades ===
Date	Trade		Ref.
March 16, 2022	To Taichung Wagor Suns: Chou Tzu-Hua	To TaiwanBeer HeroBears: 2022 Suns' second-round pick; 2023 Suns' second-round pick	

=== Free agency ===
==== Additions ====
Date	Player	Contract terms	Former team	Ref.
July 2, 2021	Su Yi-Chin	—N/a	(Taiwan) Kaohsiung Jeoutai Technology	
July 6, 2021	Chiu Po-Chang	—N/a	(Taiwan) Taoyuan Pauian Archiland	
July 15, 2021	Chen Wen-Hung	—N/a	(Taiwan) Kaohsiung Jeoutai Technology	
July 21, 2021	Ting Sheng-Ju	—N/a	(Taiwan) Taoyuan Pilots	
August 14, 2021	Sun Szu-Yao	—N/a	(Taiwan) Taoyuan Pilots	
August 25, 2021	Yang Cheng-Han	—N/a	(Taiwan) FJU	
August 28, 2021	Yu Chu-Hsiang	—N/a	(Taiwan) SHU	
August 29, 2021	Sani Sakakini	—N/a	(China) Beijing Royal Fighters	
September 3, 2021	Chen Ching-Huan	—N/a	(Taiwan) Taoyuan Pilots	
September 14, 2021	Kao Meng-Wei	—N/a	(Taiwan) NTCUST	
September 18, 2021	Li Ping-Hung	—N/a	(Taiwan) Kaohsiung Jeoutai Technology	
September 23, 2021	Alonzo Gee	—N/a	(United States) Bivouac	
October 7, 2021	Donté Greene	—N/a	(United States) Killer 3's	
October 20, 2021	Jordan Heading	—N/a	(Philippines) San Miguel Alab Pilipinas	
December 21, 2021	Julian Wright	—N/a	(United States) Bivouac	
February 9, 2022	Anthony Tucker	—N/a	(Taiwan) Kaohsiung Steelers	
March 18, 2022	Aaron Geramipoor	—N/a	(Chile) C.D. Universidad de Concepción	
March 19, 2022	Niño Canaleta	—N/a	(Philippines) Blackwater Bossing	

==== Subtractions ====
Date	Player	Reason	New team	Ref.
May 31, 2022	Donté Greene	Contract expired	(United States) Killer 3's	

== Awards ==
=== Yearly awards ===
Recipient	Award	Ref.
Anthony Tucker	Sixth Man of the Year	
Sani Sakakini	All-T1 League First Team	

=== MVP of the Month ===
Month	Recipient	Award	Ref.
March	Chen Ching-Huan	March MVP of the Month	

=== Import of the Month ===
Month	Recipient	Award	Ref.
January	Sani Sakakini	January Import of the Month	
March	Sani Sakakini	March Import of the Month	
