= Jordan Heading =

Filipino basketball player

No. 15 – TNT Tropang 5G
- Position: Shooting guard / point guard
- League: PBA

Personal information
- Born: January 30, 1996 (age 30) Adelaide, Australia
- Listed height: 6 ft 2 in (1.88 m)
- Listed weight: 189.6 lb (86 kg)

Career information
- High school: Sunrise Christian School (Adelaide, Australia)
- College: California Baptist (2015–2019)
- PBA draft: 2020: Special round1st overall (Note: The 2021 draft was composed of two drafts: the Gilas special round and the regular draft. Heading was selected as the 1st pick of the special draft.)
- Drafted by: Terrafirma Dyip
- Playing career: 2019–present

Career history
- 2019–2020: San Miguel Alab Pilipinas
- 2021–2022: Taichung Wagor Suns
- 2022–2023: Nagasaki Velca
- 2024: West Adelaide Bearcats
- 2024–2025: Converge FiberXers
- 2025–present: TNT Tropang 5G

Career highlights
- PBA All-Rookie Team (2025)

Jordan Timothy Heading (born January 30, 1996) is a Filipino basketball player for the TNT Tropang 5G of the Philippine Basketball Association (PBA).

== Early life and education ==
Jordan Heading was born on January 30, 1996 in Adelaide to an Australian father and a Filipino mother. He attended the Morrison Academy in Taiwan for his high school studies, before going to the United States, to enter the California Baptist University in Riverside, California to pursue a degree in kinesiology.

== College career ==
Heading played for the California Baptist University (CBU) Lancers in college as a starting point guard. He was named a member of the Academic All-Pacific West five team.

== Professional career ==
=== San Miguel Alab Pilipinas (2019–2020) ===
Heading started his professional career with San Miguel Alab Pilipinas of the ASEAN Basketball League joining the team in October 2019. The COVID-19 pandemic led to the cancellation of the 2019–20 season, consequentially also ending his stint with Alab.

In the season 46 draft of the Philippine Basketball Association (PBA) in March 2021, Heading was selected by the Terrafirma Dyip as the top pick for the special Gilas Pilipinas draft. He was to be loaned to the Philippine national team before he could suit up for Terrafirma. He would join the Taichung Wagor Suns of Taiwan in October 2022. This raised some concern with Heading's contract with the Samahang Basketbol ng Pilipinas, the Philippine basketball federation, which was supposed to be active until March 2023 arising from his involvement in the special PBA draft.

=== Taichung Wagor Suns (2021–2022) ===
Heading went on to play for Taichung Wagor Suns. Heading's stint with the Suns covered its 2021–22 season, the Suns' first in the T1 League of Taiwan. The team finished as runners-up for that season.

=== Nagasaki Velca (2022–2023) ===
On July 1, 2022, he joined the Nagasaki Velca which competes in the 2nd division of Japan's B.League. He was released by the team on June 6, 2023.

=== West Adelaide Bearcats (2024) ===
In March 2024, Heading signed with the West Adelaide Bearcats of the NBL1.

=== Converge FiberXers (2024–2025) ===
On November 12, 2024, Heading's draft rights were acquired by the Converge FiberXers from the Terrafirma Dyip in exchange for Aljun Melecio, Keith Zaldivar and 2025 Converge first-round pick.

=== TNT Tropang 5G (2025–present) ===
On June 2, 2025, Heading was traded to the TNT Tropang 5G in exchange for the rights of Mikey Williams.

== PBA career statistics ==
Legend
GP	Games played	MPG	Minutes per game	FG%	Field-goal percentage
3FG%	3-point field-goal percentage	4P%	4-point field-goal percentage	FT%	Free-throw percentage
RPG	Rebounds per game	APG	Assists per game	SPG	Steals per game
BPG	Blocks per game	PPG	Points per game	127	Career high

As of the end of 2024–25 season

=== Season-by-season averages ===
Year	Team	GP	MPG	FG%	3P%	4P%	FT%	RPG	APG	SPG	BPG	PPG
2024–25	Converge	31	31.0	.446	.375	.250	.864	4.2	4.8	.8	.2	15.5
2024–25	TNT	31	31.0	.446	.375	.250	.864	4.2	4.8	.8	.2	15.5
Career		31	31.0	.446	.375	.250	.864	4.2	4.8	.8	.2	15.5

== National team career ==
Heading has played for the Philippine national team. Having obtained his Philippine passport before the age of 16, Heading is eligible to play for the Philippines as a local player under FIBA eligibility rules despite him being born outside the Philippines and having non-Filipino heritage.

He has played in the Philippine national youth system, having taken part in the 2011 FIBA Asia Under-16 Championship in Vietnam.

Heading was part of the Philippine senior team which took part in the Belgrade tournament of the 2020 FIBA Men's Olympic Qualifiers.

Heading would be committed to the senior national team when he got picked by the Terrafirma Dyip in the special Gilas Pilipinas draft of the March 2021 PBA draft. However contractual issues arose when he joined the Taichun Suns in October 2021. The issue would be resolved and Heading would return to play for the Philippines in the February 2023 window of the 2023 FIBA Basketball World Cup Asia qualifier.

Heading was included in the 21-man pool for the 2023 FIBA World Cup. He was eventually ruled out due to injury.

== Personal life ==
Heading is married to Lauren, an American professional volleyball player since 2019. They first met each other at California Baptist University where they both studied.
