= Ramon Galloway =

American basketball player

No. 55 – Changsha Yongsheng
- Position: Guard
- League: National Basketball League

Personal information
- Born: February 10, 1991 (age 35) Philadelphia, Pennsylvania, U.S.
- Listed height: 6 ft 1 in (1.85 m)
- Listed weight: 174 lb (79 kg)

Career information
- High school: Freire Charter (Center City, Pennsylvania); William T. Dwyer (Palm Beach Gardens, Florida)
- College: South Carolina (2009–2011); La Salle (2011–2013)
- NBA draft: 2013: undrafted
- Playing career: 2013–present

Career history
- 2013: Igokea
- 2013–2014: Skyliners Frankfurt
- 2014–2015: Derthona Tortona
- 2015–2016: Openjobmetis Varese
- 2016: Paffoni Omegna
- 2016–2017: Erie BayHawks
- 2017: TED Ankara Kolejliler
- 2017: Al Sadd Doha
- 2018: Sporting Al Riyadi Beirut
- 2018: Leones de Santo Domingo
- 2018–2019: Al Ittihad Alexandria
- 2019: Mantarrayas de La Paz
- 2019–2020: Anibal Zahle
- 2020: Club Pueblo Nuevo
- 2021: Dorados de Chihuahua
- 2021: Club Pueblo Nuevo
- 2021: Club Bameso
- 2021: Metros de Santiago
- 2021–2022: Taiwan Beer
- 2022: TaiwanBeer HeroBears
- 2022: Metros de Santiago
- 2022: Spartans Distrito Capital
- 2022–2023: Dewa United Banten
- 2023: Spartans Distrito Capital
- 2023: Indios de San Francisco de Macorís
- 2023–2024: AS Salé
- 2024: Club Rafael Barias
- 2024–2025: Al-Ahly Ly
- 2025: Al-Difaa Al-Jawi
- 2025: CJS Batroun
- 2025: Alborz
- 2026–present: Changsha Yongsheng

Career highlights
- IBL Slam Dunk Contest Champion (2023); IBL All-Star (2023); Arab Club Championship champion (2019); First-team All-Atlantic 10 (2013); Second-team All-Atlantic 10 (2012)
- Stats at Basketball Reference

Ramon Galloway (born February 10, 1991) is an American professional basketball player for the Changsha Yongsheng of the National Basketball League. He played college basketball for South Carolina and La Salle.

== High school career ==
Galloway first attended Freire Charter High School for two seasons before transferring to William T. Dwyer High School where he averaged 17.7 points, 7.0 rebounds and 4.5 assists as a senior. After graduating, he was the No. 29 point guard by Scout.com while being ranked as a Rivals.com Top 150 prospect and the No. 24 ranked point guard.

== College career ==
Galloway played for two years at South Carolina averaging 10.7 points a game in his sophomore season, being the third leading scorer for the Gamecocks. Before entering his junior season, he transferred to La Salle. He received a hardship waiver from NCAA to compete immediately after transferring, and averaged 14.1 points, 4.0 rebounds, and 3.8 assists per game as a junior. Galloway was a Second Team All-Atlantic 10 and Second Team NABC All-District IV selection. In 34 games as a senior, he averaged 17.2 points, 4.6 rebounds. and 3.7 assists in 33.3 minutes, leading La Salle to the Sweet Sixteen in the 2013 NCAA Tournament. For his efforts, Galloway was named to the 2012–13 All-Atlantic 10 First Team.

== Professional career ==
After going undrafted in the 2013 NBA draft, Galloway joined the Denver Nuggets for the 2013 NBA Summer League. On July 16, 2013, he signed with Igokea of the ABA League. On November 1, he parted ways with Igokea. In four league games, Galloway averaged three points and eight rebounds while in the Eurocup he averaged 7.0 points, two rebounds and 7.0 assists.

On November 6, 2013, Galloway signed with Skyliners Frankfurt of the German Bundesliga. On February 27, he re-signed with Frankfurt for the rest of the season. On April 26, he parted ways with Skyliners Frankfurt. In 24 games, he averaged 9.8 points, 2.5 rebounds and two assists in 25 minutes.

On September 23, 2014, Galloway signed with Derthona Tortona of the Italian Serie A2 for the rest of the season. He averaged 14.9 points, 4.7 rebounds and 3 assists per game in Derthona.

In July 2015, Galloway joined the Chicago Bulls for the 2015 NBA Summer League. On July 25, 2015, he signed with Openjobmetis Varese of the Italian Serie A. On February 4, 2016, he parted ways with Varese. In 10 games, he averaged 9.3 points, 3.6 rebounds, 2.4 assists and 1.6 steals.

On February 5, 2016, Galloway signed with Paffoni Omegna of the Italian Serie A2 for the rest of the season. in 10 games with Omegna, he averaged 14.9 points, 5.2 rebounds, 3.1 assists and 1.4 steals.

In July 2016, Galloway joined the Charlotte Hornets for the 2016 NBA Summer League. On October 21, 2016, he signed with the Orlando Magic, but was waived the next day. On October 29, he was acquired by the Erie BayHawks of the NBA Development League as an affiliate player of the Magic.

On January 20, 2017, Galloway signed with Turkish club TED Ankara Kolejliler for the rest of the 2016–17 season.

In October 2017, Galloway signed with Al Sadd Doha of the Qatari Basketball League. He left Al Sadd after appearing in two games. On January 25, 2018, he signed with Sporting Al Riyadi Beirut of the Lebanese Basketball League. Galloway signed with Mantarrayas de La Paz in Mexico on May 16, 2019. Galloway averaged 14.7 points, 3.7 rebounds, 2.3 assists and 1.5 steals per game. On June 18, he signed with Anibal Zahle of the Lebanese Basketball League. Galloway joined Club Pueblo Nuevo in the Dominican Republic in 2020.

In October 2023, Galloway joined Moroccan side AS Salé of the Division Excellence.

In November 24, 2024, Galloway signed with the Al-Ahly Ly of the Libyan Basketball League (LBL).

== Personal life ==
The son of Karen Davis and Gerald Galloway Jr., he has nine siblings. He majored in criminal justice. He has two sons Ramon Jr. and youngest Cartier Galloway
