= Aaron Epps =

American basketball player (born 1996)

Personal information
- Born: April 28, 1996 (age 30) Louisville, Kentucky, U.S.
- Listed height: 6 ft 9 in (2.06 m)
- Listed weight: 225 lb (102 kg)

Career information
- High school: Tioga (Tioga, Louisiana)
- College: LSU (2014–2018)
- NBA draft: 2018: undrafted
- Playing career: 2018–2023
- Position: Power forward

Career history
- 2018–2019: Northern Arizona Suns
- 2019: Élan Chalon
- 2019–2020: Northern Arizona Suns
- 2021: Cleveland Charge
- 2021: Agribertocchi Orzinuovi
- 2022: New Taipei CTBC DEA
- 2022–2023: Raptors 905
- 2023: Greensboro Swarm
- Stats at Basketball Reference

Aaron DeVon Epps (born April 28, 1996) is an American former professional basketball player. He played college basketball for the LSU Tigers, and has played overseas in France, Israel, Italy, and Taiwan.

== Early life and high school ==
Epps grew up in Ball, Louisiana and attended Tioga High School. As a junior, he averaged 18 points, 12 rebounds and six blocks per game and was named All-Cenla first team and was an honorable mention for the Class 4A all-state team. As a senior, he averaged 22.3 points, 11.7 rebounds, and 6.7 blocks per game and was named All-Cenla MVP and first team class 4A all-state team. Epps committed to LSU over offers from Louisiana Tech, Memphis, Oklahoma State and Mississippi State. On January 2, 2024, Tioga High School retired Epps’ jersey number 21 making it the first jersey retirement in school history.

== College career ==
Epps played four seasons for the LSU Tigers. His playing time increased each year and he became the team's starting power forward during his junior season and averaged 6.2 points and 4.4 rebounds per game while starting 19 games. As a senior, Epps averaged 9.5 points and 5.5 rebounds per game.

== Professional career ==
=== Northern Arizona Suns (2018–2019) ===
Epps was selected sixth overall in the 2018 NBA G League draft by the Northern Arizona Suns. He averaged 10.3 points and 6.7 rebounds over 48 games in his first professional season as Northern Arizona finished last in the Western Conference.

=== Élan Chalon (2019) ===
Following the end of the G League season, Epps signed with Élan Chalon of France's LNB Pro A on March 25, 2019. Elan Chalon terminated his contract on May 9, 2019. He averaged 6.0 points and 3.1 rebounds in eight games for Chalon.

=== Return to Northern Arizona (2019–2020) ===
Epps returned to Northern Arizona to start the 2019–20 G League season. On February 6, 2020, Epps posted 17 points, 10 rebounds and one steal in a 123–107 G League loss to the Stockton Kings. In 37 games for the Northern Arizona Suns, Epps averaged 10.2 points and 6.5 rebounds per game.

=== Cleveland Charge (2021) ===
For the 2020–21 season, Epps joined the Cleveland Charge of the G League. He played in 12 games, averaging 5.7 point and 4.8 rebounds per game.

=== Agribertocchi Orzinuovi (2021) ===
On August 8, 2021, Epps signed with Agribertocchi Orzinuovi of the Italian league Serie A2 Basket. On December 23, he left the team. He appeared in 11 games for the team, averaging 14.5 points, 10.8 rebounds, 1 block, and 1 assist per game.

On January 5, 2022, Epps' NBA G League player rights were traded from the Charge to the Raptors 905.

=== New Taipei CTBC DEA (2022) ===
On February 12, 2022, Epps signed with New Taipei CTBC DEA of the T1 League. He played in 14 games, averaging 17.9 points and 9.1 rebounds per game while shooting 51% from the field and 39% from 3 point.

=== Raptors 905 (2022–2023) ===
On December 12, 2022, Epps signed a contract to join the Raptors 905.

=== Greensboro Swarm (2023) ===
On February 24, 2023, Epps was traded to the Greensboro Swarm.
