= Kaohsiung Aquas all-time roster =

The following is a list of players, both past and current, who appeared at least in one game for the Kaohsiung Aquas (2021–present) franchise.

== Players ==
Note: Statistics are correct through the end of the 2025–26 TPBL season.

| G | Guard | PG | Point guard | SG | Shooting guard | G/F | Guard-forward | F | Forward | SF | Small forward | PF | Power forward | F/C | Forward-center | C | Center |

| ^{*} | Denotes player who has been selected for at least one All-Star Game and is currently on the Kaohsiung Aquas roster |
| ^{+} | Denotes player who has been selected for at least one All-Star Game with the Kaohsiung Aquas |
| ^{x} | Denotes player who is currently on the Kaohsiung Aquas roster |
| 0.0 | Denotes the Kaohsiung Aquas statistics leader (min. 40 games played for the team for per-game statistics) |
| player | Denotes player who has played for the Kaohsiung Aquas in the T1 |

=== A ===
| Player | Name | Nat. | Pos. | From | Yrs | Seasons | Statistics | | | | | | | | | Ref. |
| Player | Name | Nat. | Pos. | From | Yrs | Seasons | GP | MP | PTS | REB | AST | MPG | PPG | RPG | APG | Ref. |
|---|---|---|---|---|---|---|---|---|---|---|---|---|---|---|---|---|
| Xavier Alexander | 亞歷山大 | (United States) | SG/SF | Southern Nazarene | 2 | 2021–2023 | 28 | 728:36 | 308 | 217 | 90 | 26:01 | 11.0 | 7.8 | 3.2 | |
| Rosco Allen^{x} | 洛斯柯 | (Hungary) (United States) | PF/C | Stanford | 1 | 2026–present | 0 | 0:00 | 0 | 0 | 0 | 0:00 | 0.0 | 0.0 | 0.0 | |

=== B ===
| Player | Name | Nat. | Pos. | From | Yrs | Seasons | Statistics | | | | | | | | | Ref. |
| Player | Name | Nat. | Pos. | From | Yrs | Seasons | GP | MP | PTS | REB | AST | MPG | PPG | RPG | APG | Ref. |
|---|---|---|---|---|---|---|---|---|---|---|---|---|---|---|---|---|
| Grant Basile^{x} | 貝西里 | (United States) (Italy) | PF/C | Virginia Tech | 1 | 2026–present | 0 | 0:00 | 0 | 0 | 0 | 0:00 | 0.0 | 0.0 | 0.0 | |
| Terrence Bieshaar | 比斯赫 | (Netherlands) | C | Netherlands | 1 | 2024–2025 | 3 | 60:55 | 13 | 8 | 3 | 20:18 | 4.3 | 2.7 | 1.0 | |
| Bogdan Bliznyuk | 布里茲克 | (Ukraine) (United States) | SF | Eastern Washington | 1 | 2025–2026 | 11 | 424:18 | 250 | 103 | 71 | 38:34 | 22.7 | 9.4 | 6.5 | |
| John Bohannon | 波捍能 | (Jordan) (United States) | C | UTEP | 1 | 2022–2023 | 27 | 569:35 | 248 | 269 | 61 | 21:05 | 9.2 | 10.0 | 2.3 | |
| Jason Brickman^{+} | 布銳克曼 | (Philippines) (United States) | PG | LIU Brooklyn | 4 | 2021–2025 | 82 | 3245:45 | 1226 | 471 | 852 | 39:34 | 15.0 | 5.7 | 10.4 | |

=== C ===
| Player | Name | Nat. | Pos. | From | Yrs | Seasons | Statistics | | | | | | | | | Ref. |
| Player | Name | Nat. | Pos. | From | Yrs | Seasons | GP | MP | PTS | REB | AST | MPG | PPG | RPG | APG | Ref. |
|---|---|---|---|---|---|---|---|---|---|---|---|---|---|---|---|---|
| Chen Huai-An^{x} | 陳懷安 | (Taiwan) | G | NTUA | 6 | 2021–present | 103 | 1246:33 | 334 | 142 | 251 | 12:06 | 3.3 | 1.4 | 2.4 | |
| Chin Ming-Ching | 勤明慶 | (Taiwan) | C | NTNU | 5 | 2021–2026 | 58 | 358:04 | 42 | 66 | 15 | 6:10 | 0.7 | 1.1 | 0.3 | |
| Chiu Tzu-Hsuan^{*} | 邱子軒 | (Taiwan) | SG/SF | ISU | 4 | 2022–2025; 2026–present | 63 | 1502:54 | 560 | 214 | 128 | 23:51 | 8.9 | 3.4 | 2.0 | |

=== F ===
| Player | Name | Nat. | Pos. | From | Yrs | Seasons | Statistics | | | | | | | | | Ref. |
| Player | Name | Nat. | Pos. | From | Yrs | Seasons | GP | MP | PTS | REB | AST | MPG | PPG | RPG | APG | Ref. |
|---|---|---|---|---|---|---|---|---|---|---|---|---|---|---|---|---|
| Mayaw Fotol^{x} | 廖偉皓 | (Taiwan) | SF | NTSU | 2 | 2025–present | 21 | 303:36 | 103 | 32 | 8 | 14:27 | 4.9 | 1.5 | 0.4 | |

=== G ===
| Player | Name | Nat. | Pos. | From | Yrs | Seasons | Statistics | | | | | | | | | Ref. |
| Player | Name | Nat. | Pos. | From | Yrs | Seasons | GP | MP | PTS | REB | AST | MPG | PPG | RPG | APG | Ref. |
|---|---|---|---|---|---|---|---|---|---|---|---|---|---|---|---|---|
| Gabriel Galvanini^{x} | 加爾文 | (Brazil) | PF | Brazil | 1 | 2026–present | 0 | 0:00 | 0 | 0 | 0 | 0:00 | 0.0 | 0.0 | 0.0 | |
| Aaron Geramipoor | 艾倫 | (United Kingdom) (Iran) | C | Seton Hall | 1 | 2023–2024 | 18 | 372:19 | 224 | 112 | 25 | 20:41 | 12.4 | 6.2 | 1.4 | |

=== H ===
| Player | Name | Nat. | Pos. | From | Yrs | Seasons | Statistics | | | | | | | | | Ref. |
| Player | Name | Nat. | Pos. | From | Yrs | Seasons | GP | MP | PTS | REB | AST | MPG | PPG | RPG | APG | Ref. |
|---|---|---|---|---|---|---|---|---|---|---|---|---|---|---|---|---|
| Ferrakohn Hall | 霍爾 | (United States) | PF | Memphis | 1 | 2021–2022 | 27 | 553:41 | 392 | 168 | 36 | 20:30 | 14.5 | 6.2 | 1.3 | |
| Adam Hinton^{x} | 賀丹 | (United States) (Taiwan) | SG/SF | Cornell | 1 | 2026–present | 0 | 0:00 | 0 | 0 | 0 | 0:00 | 0.0 | 0.0 | 0.0 | |
| Hu Long-Mao^{*} | 胡瓏貿 | (Taiwan) | PF | Chaminade | 6 | 2021–present | 147 | 4101:58 | 1806 | 667 | 337 | 27:54 | 12.3 | 4.5 | 2.3 | |

=== J ===
| Player | Name | Nat. | Pos. | From | Yrs | Seasons | Statistics | | | | | | | | | Ref. |
| Player | Name | Nat. | Pos. | From | Yrs | Seasons | GP | MP | PTS | REB | AST | MPG | PPG | RPG | APG | Ref. |
|---|---|---|---|---|---|---|---|---|---|---|---|---|---|---|---|---|
| Justin James | 詹姆斯 | (United States) | SF | Wyoming | 1 | 2025–2026 | 4 | 135:06 | 92 | 38 | 19 | 33:46 | 23.0 | 9.5 | 4.8 | |
| Perry Jones | 瓊斯 | (United States) | F | Baylor | 1 | 2023–2024 | 12 | 266:35 | 130 | 62 | 23 | 22:12 | 10.8 | 5.2 | 1.9 | |

=== K ===
| Player | Name | Nat. | Pos. | From | Yrs | Seasons | Statistics | | | | | | | | | Ref. |
| Player | Name | Nat. | Pos. | From | Yrs | Seasons | GP | MP | PTS | REB | AST | MPG | PPG | RPG | APG | Ref. |
|---|---|---|---|---|---|---|---|---|---|---|---|---|---|---|---|---|
| Kristijan Krajina | 克力斯 | (Croatia) | C | Mount St. Mary's | 1 | 2025–2026 | 22 | 671:14 | 287 | 235 | 51 | 30:30 | 13.0 | 10.7 | 2.3 | |
| Mindaugas Kupšas^{+} | 庫薩斯 | (Lithuania) | C | LSU | 3 | 2021–2024 | 77 | 2538:28 | 1708 | 924 | 152 | 32:58 | 22.2 | 12.0 | 2.0 | |

=== L ===
| Player | Name | Nat. | Pos. | From | Yrs | Seasons | Statistics | | | | | | | | | Ref. |
| Player | Name | Nat. | Pos. | From | Yrs | Seasons | GP | MP | PTS | REB | AST | MPG | PPG | RPG | APG | Ref. |
|---|---|---|---|---|---|---|---|---|---|---|---|---|---|---|---|---|
| Cady Lalanne | 凱帝 | (Haiti) | C | UMass | 1 | 2025–2026 | 12 | 360:07 | 189 | 114 | 16 | 30:00 | 15.8 | 9.5 | 1.3 | |
| Li Han-Sheng | 李漢昇 | (Taiwan) | PG | NTNU | 1 | 2021–2022 | 17 | 224:01 | 76 | 31 | 32 | 13:10 | 4.5 | 1.8 | 1.9 | |
| Lin Jen-Hung^{+} | 林任鴻 | (Taiwan) | SF | NTNU | 4 | 2021–2025 | 109 | 2285:43 | 628 | 214 | 152 | 20:58 | 5.8 | 2.0 | 1.4 | |
| Lu Wei-Ting^{x} | 呂威霆 | (Taiwan) | PF/C | ISU | 6 | 2021–present | 105 | 1108:17 | 349 | 244 | 55 | 10:33 | 3.3 | 2.3 | 0.5 | |

=== M ===
| Player | Name | Nat. | Pos. | From | Yrs | Seasons | Statistics | | | | | | | | | Ref. |
| Player | Name | Nat. | Pos. | From | Yrs | Seasons | GP | MP | PTS | REB | AST | MPG | PPG | RPG | APG | Ref. |
|---|---|---|---|---|---|---|---|---|---|---|---|---|---|---|---|---|
| Hunter Maldonado^{x} | 杭特 | (United States) | G | Wyoming | 2 | 2025–present | 9 | 311:07 | 207 | 60 | 61 | 34:34 | 23.0 | 6.7 | 6.8 | |
| Anthony Morse | 摩爾斯 | (United States) (Italy) | PF | Tennessee Tech | 1 | 2024–2025 | 35 | 1118:00 | 552 | 354 | 41 | 31:56 | 15.8 | 10.1 | 1.2 | |
| Arnett Moultrie | 摩爾特里 | (United States) | C | Mississippi State | 1 | 2024–2025 | 2 | 40:01 | 6 | 11 | 3 | 20:00 | 3.0 | 5.5 | 1.5 | |

=== O ===
| Player | Name | Nat. | Pos. | From | Yrs | Seasons | Statistics | | | | | | | | | Ref. |
| Player | Name | Nat. | Pos. | From | Yrs | Seasons | GP | MP | PTS | REB | AST | MPG | PPG | RPG | APG | Ref. |
|---|---|---|---|---|---|---|---|---|---|---|---|---|---|---|---|---|
| Efe Odigie | 奧迪傑 | (United States) | C | SMU | 1 | 2025–2026 | 5 | 118:39 | 85 | 38 | 3 | 23:43 | 17.0 | 7.6 | 0.6 | |
| Chris Ortiz | 歐提斯 | (Puerto Rico) (United States) | PF | Kent State | 1 | 2025–2026 | 12 | 314:57 | 146 | 60 | 17 | 26:14 | 12.2 | 5.0 | 1.4 | |

=== S ===
| Player | Name | Nat. | Pos. | From | Yrs | Seasons | Statistics | | | | | | | | | Ref. |
| Player | Name | Nat. | Pos. | From | Yrs | Seasons | GP | MP | PTS | REB | AST | MPG | PPG | RPG | APG | Ref. |
|---|---|---|---|---|---|---|---|---|---|---|---|---|---|---|---|---|
| Shannon Scott | 史考特 | (United States) | PG | Ohio State | 1 | 2023–2024 | 9 | 362:30 | 170 | 85 | 89 | 40:16 | 18.9 | 9.4 | 9.9 | |
| Shih Chin-Yao^{x} | 施晉堯 | (Taiwan) | SG/SF | CCU | 2 | 2025–present | 29 | 616:09 | 178 | 49 | 41 | 21:14 | 6.1 | 1.7 | 1.4 | |
| Su Wen-Ju^{x} | 蘇文儒 | (Taiwan) | SG/SF | ISU | 6 | 2021–present | 119 | 2326:13 | 833 | 332 | 160 | 19:32 | 7.0 | 2.8 | 1.3 | |
| Craig Sword | 克雷格 | (United States) | G | Mississippi State | 1 | 2024–2025 | 20 | 562:33 | 371 | 106 | 67 | 28:07 | 18.6 | 5.3 | 3.4 | |

=== T ===
| Player | Name | Nat. | Pos. | From | Yrs | Seasons | Statistics | | | | | | | | | Ref. |
| Player | Name | Nat. | Pos. | From | Yrs | Seasons | GP | MP | PTS | REB | AST | MPG | PPG | RPG | APG | Ref. |
|---|---|---|---|---|---|---|---|---|---|---|---|---|---|---|---|---|
| Tang Wei-Chieh^{x} | 唐維傑 | (Taiwan) | SF | VMI | 3 | 2023–present | 53 | 581:28 | 219 | 126 | 35 | 10:58 | 4.1 | 2.4 | 0.7 | |
| Elijah Thomas | 湯馬斯 | (United States) | PF | Clemson | 1 | 2022–2023 | 3 | 51:31 | 33 | 22 | 0 | 17:10 | 11.0 | 7.3 | 0.0 | |
| Reid Travis | 崔維斯 | (United States) | C | Kentucky | 1 | 2025–2026 | 4 | 124:07 | 60 | 35 | 5 | 31:01 | 15.0 | 8.8 | 1.3 | |

=== W ===
| Player | Name | Nat. | Pos. | From | Yrs | Seasons | Statistics | | | | | | | | | Ref. |
| Player | Name | Nat. | Pos. | From | Yrs | Seasons | GP | MP | PTS | REB | AST | MPG | PPG | RPG | APG | Ref. |
|---|---|---|---|---|---|---|---|---|---|---|---|---|---|---|---|---|
| Wang Yung-Cheng | 王詠誠 | (Taiwan) | PF | NCCU | 2 | 2022–2024 | 10 | 31:36 | 6 | 3 | 0 | 3:09 | 0.6 | 0.3 | 0.0 | |
| Negus Webster-Chan | 陳內斯 | (Canada) | SF | Hawaiʻi | 1 | 2021–2022 | 6 | 122:13 | 29 | 26 | 3 | 20:22 | 4.8 | 4.3 | 0.5 | |
| Wei Liang-Che | 魏莨哲 | (Taiwan) (Vietnam) | PG | NKNU | 2 | 2024–2026 | 36 | 414:49 | 88 | 37 | 57 | 11:31 | 2.4 | 1.0 | 1.6 | |
| Kaleb Wesson | 威勝 | (United States) | C | Ohio State | 1 | 2024–2025 | 15 | 534:55 | 291 | 199 | 53 | 35:39 | 19.4 | 13.3 | 3.5 | |
| Wu I-Ping | 吳怡斌 | (Taiwan) | PF | ISU | 4 | 2021–2025 | 84 | 743:37 | 214 | 115 | 36 | 8:51 | 2.5 | 1.4 | 0.4 | |
| Wu Siao-Jin^{x} | 吳曉謹 | (Taiwan) | SF | NKNU | 6 | 2021–present | 136 | 2005:37 | 609 | 135 | 58 | 14:44 | 4.5 | 1.0 | 0.4 | |
| Wu Yen-Lun | 吳彥侖 | (Taiwan) | PG | ISU | 1 | 2025–2026 | 16 | 257:16 | 55 | 28 | 18 | 16:04 | 3.4 | 1.8 | 1.1 | |

=== Y ===
| Player | Name | Nat. | Pos. | From | Yrs | Seasons | Statistics | | | | | | | | | Ref. |
| Player | Name | Nat. | Pos. | From | Yrs | Seasons | GP | MP | PTS | REB | AST | MPG | PPG | RPG | APG | Ref. |
|---|---|---|---|---|---|---|---|---|---|---|---|---|---|---|---|---|
| Yu Chun-An^{*} | 余純安 | (Taiwan) | SG/SF | NTNU | 6 | 2021–present | 122 | 1290:10 | 444 | 156 | 70 | 10:34 | 3.6 | 1.3 | 0.6 | |
| Yu Huan-Ya^{*} | 于煥亞 | (Taiwan) | G | NTNU | 6 | 2021–present | 140 | 4299:56 | 1480 | 339 | 433 | 30:42 | 10.6 | 2.4 | 3.1 | |

=== Z ===
| Player | Name | Nat. | Pos. | From | Yrs | Seasons | Statistics | | | | | | | | | Ref. |
| Player | Name | Nat. | Pos. | From | Yrs | Seasons | GP | MP | PTS | REB | AST | MPG | PPG | RPG | APG | Ref. |
|---|---|---|---|---|---|---|---|---|---|---|---|---|---|---|---|---|
| Rade Zagorac | 賽克維奇 | (Serbia) | PF | Serbia | 1 | 2025–2026 | 7 | 166:33 | 103 | 50 | 15 | 23:47 | 14.7 | 7.1 | 2.1 | |
| Edgaras Želionis | 艾德 | (Lithuania) | PF | Lithuania | 2 | 2024–2026 | 28 | 954:16 | 521 | 307 | 70 | 34:04 | 18.6 | 11.0 | 2.5 | |
