= List of Kaohsiung Aquas head coaches =

The Kaohsiung Aquas are a Taiwanese professional basketball team based in Kaohsiung City, Taiwan. The team is owned by Kuo Yang Construction and coached by Zico Coronel. The Aquas won 1 T1 League championship and 0 Taiwan Professional Basketball League championship since the team was founded in 2021.

There have been 4 head coaches for the Kaohsiung Aquas franchise. They won their first T1 League championship in the 2022 T1 League finals coached by Brendan Joyce, but haven't won any Taiwan Professional Basketball League championship.

== Key ==
GC	Games coached
W	Wins
L	Losses
Win%	Winning percentage
#	Number of coaches

== Coaches ==
Note: Statistics are correct through the end of the 2025–26 TPBL season.

#	Name	Term	GC	W	L	Win%	GC	W	L	Win%	Achievements
#	Name	Term	Regular season				Playoffs				Achievements
Kaohsiung Aquas
1	Brendan Joyce	2021–2024	88	54	34	.614	13	7	6	.538	2021–22 T1 League Coach of the Year; 1 T1 League championship (2022)
2	Mathias Fischer	2024–2025	50	23	27	.460	12	7	5	.583	
3	Zhu Yong-Hong	2026	21	5	16	.238	–	–	–	–	
4	Zico Coronel	2026–present	0	0	0	–	–	–	–	–	
