= 2021–22 Kaohsiung Aquas season =

Taiwanese professional basketball season

- T1 League champions
- President: Hou Chia-Chi
- General Manager: Wang De-Yao
- Head Coach: Brendan Joyce
- Arena: Kaohsiung Arena; Fengshan Arena

T1 League results
- Record: 23–7 (76.7%)
- Place: 1st
- Playoffs finish: Champions (1st title) (defeated Suns, 3–0)

Player records
- Points: Mindaugas Kupšas 23.3
- Rebounds: Mindaugas Kupšas 14.3
- Assists: Jason Brickman 10.3

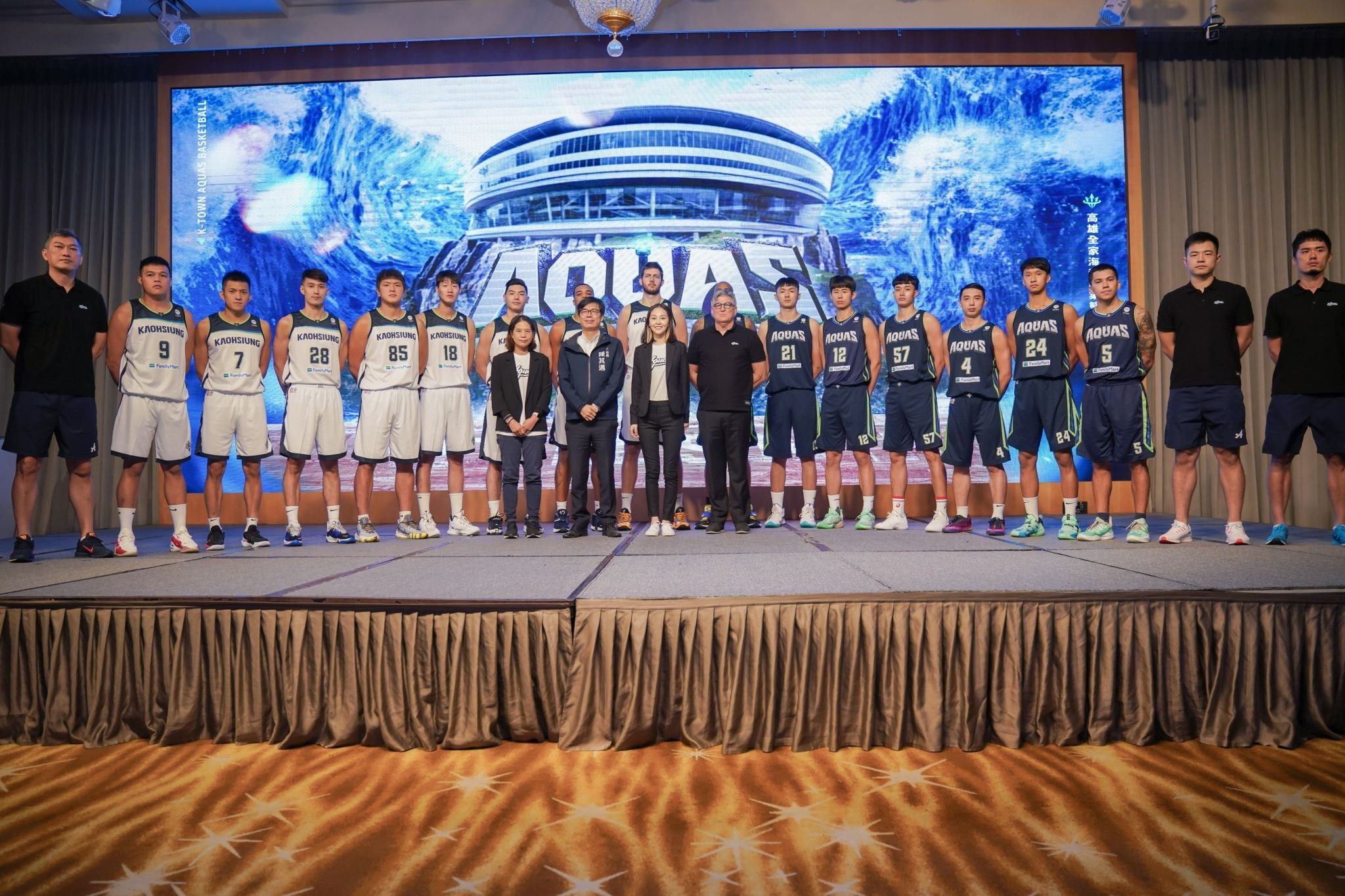
Kaohsiung Aquas held the preseason press conference on November 23, 2021.

The 2021–22 Kaohsiung Aquas season was the franchise's first season, its first season in the T1 League.

The Aquas were coached by Brendan Joyce in his first year as their head coach. On May 26, 2021, the Aquas hired Wang De-Yao as their general manager.

== Draft ==
Round	Player	Position(s)	School / club team
2	Su Wen-Ju	Shooting guard / small forward	ISU

- Reference：

On August 4, 2021, the Aquas' 2021 first-round pick was traded to New Taipei CTBC DEA in exchange for cash considerations.

== Roster ==
2021–22 Kaohsiung Aquas roster
Players
Coaches

Pos.	No.	Nat.	Name	Ht.	Wt.	Age	From
PG	4	(Taiwan)	Li Han-Sheng	1.77 m (5 ft 10 in)	76 kg (168 lb)	27 – 24 October 1994	NTNU
PG	5	(Philippines) (United States)	Jason Brickman (AI)	1.79 m (5 ft 10 in)	79 kg (174 lb)	30 – 19 November 1991	LIU Brooklyn
PG	7	(Taiwan)	Yu Huan-Ya	1.82 m (6 ft 0 in)	80 kg (176 lb)	28 – 30 November 1993	NTNU
PG	9	(Taiwan)	Chen Huai-An	1.86 m (6 ft 1 in)	90 kg (198 lb)	25 – 29 April 1997	NTUA
SF	10	(Taiwan)	Hu Long-Mao	1.95 m (6 ft 5 in)	97 kg (214 lb)	29 – 22 December 1992	Chaminade
SF	12	(Taiwan)	Lin Jen-Hung	1.94 m (6 ft 4 in)	88 kg (194 lb)	28 – 18 December 1993	NTNU
SF	14	(Canada)	Negus Webster-Chan (I)	2.01 m (6 ft 7 in)	89 kg (196 lb)	29 – 7 January 1993	Hawaiʻi
SF	15	(United States)	Xavier Alexander (I)	1.98 m (6 ft 6 in)	102 kg (225 lb)	33 – 19 October 1988	Southern Nazarene
PF	18	(Taiwan)	Wu I-Ping	2.00 m (6 ft 7 in)	90 kg (198 lb)	29 – 29 August 1992	ISU
C	21	(Taiwan)	Lu Wei-Ting	2.00 m (6 ft 7 in)	100 kg (220 lb)	25 – 16 April 1997	ISU
SG	24	(Taiwan)	Su Wen-Ju	1.87 m (6 ft 2 in)	80 kg (176 lb)	24 – 16 October 1997	ISU
PF	25	(United States)	Ferrakohn Hall (I)	2.03 m (6 ft 8 in)	107 kg (236 lb)	31 – 20 September 1990	Memphis
SG	28	(Taiwan)	Yu Chun-An (C)	1.89 m (6 ft 2 in)	83 kg (183 lb)	30 – 13 February 1992	NTNU
C	49	(Lithuania)	Mindaugas Kupšas (I)	2.17 m (7 ft 1 in)	122 kg (269 lb)	31 – 9 April 1991	LSU
SF	57	(Taiwan)	Wu Siao-Jin	1.90 m (6 ft 3 in)	83 kg (183 lb)	26 – 28 August 1995	NKNU
PF	85	(Taiwan)	Chin Ming-Ching	1.95 m (6 ft 5 in)	110 kg (243 lb)	27 – 14 November 1994	NTNU

Head coach

- (Australia) Brendan Joyce

Assistant coach(es)

- (Taiwan) Zhu Yong-Hong
- (Taiwan) Peng Te-Hsuan

Athletic trainer(s)

- (Taiwan) Duan Yi

Team manager

- (Taiwan) Wang De-Yao

Legend

- (C) Team captain
- (I) Import player
- (AI) Asian import player
- Injured

- Roster
Updated: March 18, 2022

== Preseason ==
=== Game log ===
2021 preseason game log
Total: 0–1 (home: 0–1; road: 0–0)
Preseason : 0–1 (home: 0–1; road: 0–0)

Game	Date	Team	Score	High points	High rebounds	High assists	Location Attendance	Record
1	November 14	DEA	L 86–101	Yu Huan-Ya (18)	Wu I-Ping (14)	Yu Huan-Ya (3); Hu Long-Mao (3); Chen Huai-An (3); Wu I-Ping (3); Yu Chun-An (3)	Kaohsiung Arena; 4,617	0–1

Color： Win Lose
Schedule

== Regular season ==
=== Standings ===
Pos	Team	Pld	W	L	PCT	GB	Qualification
1	Kaohsiung Aquas	30	23	7	.767	—	Advance to semifinals
2	Taichung Wagor Suns	30	20	10	.667	3	Advance to semifinals
3	New Taipei CTBC DEA	30	17	13	.567	6	Advance to semifinals
4	TaiwanBeer HeroBears	30	16	14	.533	7	Advance to play-in
5	Taoyuan Leopards	30	8	22	.267	15	Advance to play-in
6	Tainan TSG GhostHawks	30	6	24	.200	17	

Source: T1 League

With a victory against the Taoyuan Leopards on April 17, 2022, the Aquas clinched the league's best record for the 2021–22 season.

=== Game log ===
2021–22 regular season game log
Total: 23–7 (home: 12–3; road: 11–4)
November : 1–0 (home: 0–0; road: 1–0)

Game	Date	Team	Score	High points	High rebounds	High assists	Location Attendance	Record
1	November 27	@ HeroBears	W 107–106	Mindaugas Kupšas (27)	Mindaugas Kupšas (15)	Jason Brickman (8)	University of Taipei Tianmu Campus Gymnasium; 3,456	1–0

December : 4–1 (home: 3–0; road: 1–1)

Game	Date	Team	Score	High points	High rebounds	High assists	Location Attendance	Record
2	December 5	@ DEA	W 87–69	Mindaugas Kupšas (28)	Mindaugas Kupšas (19)	Jason Brickman (7)	Xinzhuang Gymnasium; 4,632	2–0
3	December 18	DEA	W 108–67	Yu Huan-Ya (29)	Mindaugas Kupšas (19)	Jason Brickman (8)	Kaohsiung Arena; 8,268	3–0
4	December 19	Suns	W 92–81	Jason Brickman (22)	Mindaugas Kupšas (13)	Jason Brickman (5)	Kaohsiung Arena; 3,507	4–0
5	December 26	@ Suns	L 88–93	Hu Long-Mao (18)	Xavier Alexander (9)	Jason Brickman (6)	National Taiwan University of Sport Gymnasium	4–1
6	December 31	HeroBears	W 114–113	Jason Brickman (29)	Hu Long-Mao (8)	Jason Brickman (10)	Kaohsiung Arena; 3,321	5–1

January : 4–2 (home: 2–2; road: 2–0)

Game	Date	Team	Score	High points	High rebounds	High assists	Location Attendance	Record
7	January 2	@ GhostHawks	W 126–95	Xavier Alexander (26)	Hu Long-Mao (11)	Jason Brickman (8)	Chia Nan University of Pharmacy and Science Shao Tsung Gymnasium	6–1
8	January 8	DEA	W 93–76	Mindaugas Kupšas (26)	Mindaugas Kupšas (30)	Jason Brickman (8)	Kaohsiung Arena; 2,633	7–1
9	January 9	GhostHawks	W 96–83	Hu Long-Mao (29)	Hu Long-Mao (17)	Jason Brickman (9)	Kaohsiung Arena	8–1
10	January 15	@ Leopards	W 116–82	Hu Long-Mao (20)	Mindaugas Kupšas (18)	Jason Brickman (9)	Chung Yuan Christian University Gymnasium; No in-person attendance	9–1
—	January 23	@ HeroBears	Postponed to May 8					
11	January 28	Suns	L 89–104	Mindaugas Kupšas (31)	Mindaugas Kupšas (21)	Jason Brickman (12)	Kaohsiung Arena; No in-person attendance	9–2
12	January 30	HeroBears	L 94–100	Mindaugas Kupšas (27)	Mindaugas Kupšas (15)	Jason Brickman (10)	Kaohsiung Arena; No in-person attendance	9–3

February : 3–1 (home: 2–0; road: 1–1)

Game	Date	Team	Score	High points	High rebounds	High assists	Location Attendance	Record
—	February 5	@ Leopards	Postponed to May 1					
13	February 12	Suns	W 87–71	Mindaugas Kupšas (20)	Mindaugas Kupšas (12)	Jason Brickman (9)	Kaohsiung Arena	10–3
14	February 13	Leopards	W 133–116	Mindaugas Kupšas (37)	Mindaugas Kupšas (17)	Jason Brickman (8)	Kaohsiung Arena	11–3
—	February 20	@ Leopards	Postponed to March 11					
15	February 26	@ HeroBears	L 125–131 (OT)	Jason Brickman (25)	Mindaugas Kupšas (20)	Jason Brickman (16)	University of Taipei Tianmu Campus Gymnasium	11–4
16	February 28	@ Suns	W 122–113 (OT)	Yu Huan-Ya (26)	Mindaugas Kupšas (13)	Hu Long-Mao (8); Xavier Alexander (8)	National Taiwan University of Sport Gymnasium	12–4

March : 5–2 (home: 3–1; road: 2–1)

Game	Date	Team	Score	High points	High rebounds	High assists	Location Attendance	Record
17	March 6	@ DEA	L 90–91	Mindaugas Kupšas (24)	Mindaugas Kupšas (14)	Jason Brickman (6)	Xinzhuang Gymnasium	12–5
18	March 11	@ Leopards	W 106–100	Mindaugas Kupšas (32)	Mindaugas Kupšas (9)	Jason Brickman (9)	Chung Yuan Christian University Gymnasium	13–5
19	March 13	@ Suns	W 98–81	Hu Long-Mao (19); Mindaugas Kupšas (19)	Mindaugas Kupšas (12)	Jason Brickman (15)	National Taiwan University of Sport Gymnasium; 4,678	14–5
20	March 19	Leopards	W 111–84	Mindaugas Kupšas (24)	Ferrakohn Hall (11)	Jason Brickman (9)	Kaohsiung Arena	15–5
21	March 20	DEA	W 100–98	Mindaugas Kupšas (19)	Mindaugas Kupšas (23)	Jason Brickman (13)	Kaohsiung Arena	16–5
22	March 26	HeroBears	L 92–99	Yu Huan-Ya (26)	Mindaugas Kupšas (15)	Jason Brickman (11)	Kaohsiung Arena	16–6
23	March 27	GhostHawks	W 103–93	Mindaugas Kupšas (27)	Mindaugas Kupšas (12)	Jason Brickman (19)	Kaohsiung Arena	17–6

April : 4–1 (home: 2–0; road: 2–1)

Game	Date	Team	Score	High points	High rebounds	High assists	Location Attendance	Record
24	April 3	@ GhostHawks	W 102–77	Mindaugas Kupšas (19)	Mindaugas Kupšas (12)	Jason Brickman (8)	Chia Nan University of Pharmacy and Science Shao Tsung Gymnasium	18–6
25	April 10	@ DEA	W 123–92	Mindaugas Kupšas (22)	Mindaugas Kupšas (14)	Jason Brickman (14)	Xinzhuang Gymnasium	19–6
26	April 16	GhostHawks	W 100–81	Mindaugas Kupšas (23)	Mindaugas Kupšas (8)	Jason Brickman (13)	Kaohsiung Arena	20–6
27	April 17	Leopards	W 119–104	Ferrakohn Hall (31)	Xavier Alexander (13)	Jason Brickman (16)	Kaohsiung Arena	21–6
28	April 23	@ GhostHawks	L 76–91	Jason Brickman (29)	Xavier Alexander (13)	Jason Brickman (4)	Chia Nan University of Pharmacy and Science Shao Tsung Gymnasium	21–7

May : 2–0 (home: 0–0; road: 2–0)

Game	Date	Team	Score	High points	High rebounds	High assists	Location Attendance	Record
29	May 1	@ Leopards	L 137–117	Ferrakohn Hall (33)	Mindaugas Kupšas (11); Xavier Alexander (11)	Jason Brickman (13)	Chung Yuan Christian University Gymnasium	22–7
—	May 8	@ HeroBears	Postponed to May 20					
30	May 20	@ HeroBears	W 124–107	Mindaugas Kupšas (36)	Mindaugas Kupšas (14)	Jason Brickman (21)	University of Taipei Tianmu Campus Gymnasium	23–7

Color： Win Lose Postponed
Schedule

=== Regular season note ===
- Due to the COVID-19 pandemic in Taoyuan, the Taoyuan City Government and Taoyuan Leopards declared that the games at the Chung Yuan Christian University Gymnasium would play behind closed doors from January 15 to 16.
- Due to the COVID-19 pandemic preventive measures of Taipei City Government, the T1 League declared that the game on January 23 would be postponed to May 8.
- Due to the COVID-19 pandemic in Taiwan, the T1 League declared that the game on February 5 would be postponed to May 1. The games at the Kaohsiung Arena would play behind closed doors from January 28 to 30.
- Due to the COVID-19 pandemic in Taiwan, the T1 League declared that the game on February 20 would be postponed to March 11.
- Because the TaiwanBeer HeroBears could not reach the minimum player number, the T1 League declared that the game on May 8 would be postponed to May 20.

== Playoffs ==
=== Game log ===
2022 playoffs game log
Total: 5–0 (home: 3–0; road: 2–0)
Semifinals : 2–0 (home: 1–0; road: 1–0)

Game	Date	Team	Score	High points	High rebounds	High assists	Location Attendance	Series
1	May 25	HeroBears	W 114–91	Mindaugas Kupšas (24)	Xavier Alexander (10)	Jason Brickman (8)	Fengshan Arena	1–0
2	May 27	@ HeroBears	W 99–93	Mindaugas Kupšas (27)	Xavier Alexander (9)	Jason Brickman (14)	University of Taipei Tianmu Campus Gymnasium	2–0

Finals : 3–0 (home: 2–0; road: 1–0)

Game	Date	Team	Score	High points	High rebounds	High assists	Location Attendance	Series
1	May 31	Suns	W 101–99	Hu Long-Mao (26)	Mindaugas Kupšas (10)	Jason Brickman (14)	Fengshan Arena	1–0
2	June 2	Suns	W 112–82	Hu Long-Mao (38)	Xavier Alexander (8)	Jason Brickman (13)	Fengshan Arena	2–0
3	June 4	@ Suns	W 103–100	Jason Brickman (23)	Mindaugas Kupšas (11)	Jason Brickman (9)	National Taiwan University of Sport Gymnasium	3–0

Color： Win Lose
Schedule

== Player statistics ==
Legend
GP	Games played	MPG	Minutes per game	2P%	2-point field goal percentage
3P%	3-point field goal percentage	FT%	Free throw percentage	RPG	Rebounds per game
APG	Assists per game	SPG	Steals per game	BPG	Blocks per game
PPG	Points per game		Led the league		Finals MVP

=== Regular season ===
Player	GP	MPG	PPG	2P%	3P%	FT%	RPG	APG	SPG	BPG
Li Han-Sheng	17	13:10	4.5	46.2%	32.6%	53.8%	1.8	1.9	0.4	0.0
Jason Brickman	30	38:13	13.6	54.5%	36.2%	81.6%	5.3	10.3	2.2	0.0
Yu Huan-Ya	30	32:29	12.1	50.6%	42.7%	72.2%	2.9	2.8	1.2	0.1
Chen Huai-An	15	3:06	1.3	22.2%	41.7%	0.0%	0.4	0.5	0.2	0.0
Hu Long-Mao	27	32:10	14.3	47.5%	32.6%	75.9%	6.1	3.0	1.3	0.1
Lin Jen-Hung	27	21:28	6.3	47.6%	38.2%	75.0%	2.4	1.4	0.9	0.1
Negus Webster-Chan^{≠}	6	20:22	4.8	30.8%	16.7%	66.7%	4.3	0.5	0.8	0.3
Xavier Alexander	23	26:11	10.6	46.0%	29.9%	55.2%	7.5	3.1	1.0	0.7
Wu I-Ping	30	11:07	3.5	53.2%	35.4%	55.6%	1.9	0.4	0.3	0.3
Lu Wei-Ting	10	5:32	2.4	50.0%	16.7%	50.0%	1.4	0.3	0.4	0.3
Su Wen-Ju	14	7:29	2.8	72.7%	24.0%	100.0%	0.9	0.4	0.6	0.1
Ferrakohn Hall	27	20:30	14.5	53.3%	24.1%	72.9%	6.2	1.3	0.5	0.5
Yu Chun-An	28	19:42	7.5	52.0%	27.3%	50.0%	2.4	1.0	1.0	0.3
Mindaugas Kupšas	28	33:22	23.3	63.0%	0.0%	78.1%	14.3	1.6	1.0	1.9
Wu Siao-Jin	15	6:01	2.0	47.4%	21.1%	0.0%	0.5	0.2	0.1	0.0
Chin Ming-Ching	15	4:53	0.6	33.3%	0.0%	16.7%	1.1	0.4	0.1	0.0

^{≠} Acquired during the season

=== Semifinals ===
Player	GP	MPG	PPG	2P%	3P%	FT%	RPG	APG	SPG	BPG
Li Han-Sheng	Did not play									
Jason Brickman	2	41:18	22.0	50.0%	71.4%	64.3%	3.0	11.0	3.0	0.0
Yu Huan-Ya	2	42:36	10.5	0.0%	43.8%	0.0%	3.5	3.0	1.5	0.5
Chen Huai-An	Did not play									
Hu Long-Mao	2	28:49	15.0	80.0%	40.0%	80.0%	7.0	3.0	0.5	0.5
Lin Jen-Hung	2	28:42	9.0	50.0%	25.0%	75.0%	3.0	0.5	1.5	0.0
Negus Webster-Chan	Did not play									
Xavier Alexander	2	25:34	14.0	66.7%	40.0%	85.7%	9.5	2.5	1.0	1.5
Wu I-Ping	2	9:54	0.0	0.0%	0.0%	0.0%	2.0	0.5	0.0	0.0
Lu Wei-Ting	2	3:05	0.0	0.0%	0.0%	0.0%	0.0	0.0	0.0	0.0
Su Wen-Ju	Did not play									
Ferrakohn Hall	2	17:42	10.5	53.3%	16.7%	100.0%	6.0	1.0	0.0	0.5
Yu Chun-An	Did not play									
Mindaugas Kupšas	2	34:03	25.5	62.5%	0.0%	91.7%	5.0	2.0	1.5	1.5
Wu Siao-Jin	2	8:14	0.0	0.0%	0.0%	0.0%	0.5	0.0	0.5	0.0
Chin Ming-Ching	Did not play									

=== Finals ===
Player	GP	MPG	PPG	2P%	3P%	FT%	RPG	APG	SPG	BPG
Li Han-Sheng	3	7:49	0.7	0.0%	0.0%	100.0%	1.0	1.3	1.0	0.0
Jason Brickman	3	39:08	17.7	37.5%	47.8%	80.0%	7.0	12.0	2.0	0.0
Yu Huan-Ya	3	37:18	11.0	71.4%	35.3%	100.0%	3.3	1.7	0.7	0.3
Chen Huai-An	1	1:46	0.0	0.0%	0.0%	0.0%	0.0	0.0	0.0	0.0
Hu Long-Mao	3	25:36	21.3	50.0%	47.4%	84.6%	2.7	3.0	1.7	0.0
Lin Jen-Hung	3	31:56	8.3	66.7%	44.4%	100.0%	2.0	2.3	0.7	0.0
Negus Webster-Chan	Did not play									
Xavier Alexander	3	18:12	7.7	45.5%	28.6%	87.5%	6.0	1.7	0.0	0.0
Wu I-Ping	3	11:47	7.7	83.3%	50.0%	66.7%	1.0	0.7	0.7	0.0
Lu Wei-Ting	1	1:46	0.0	0.0%	0.0%	0.0%	0.0	0.0	0.0	0.0
Su Wen-Ju	Did not play									
Ferrakohn Hall	3	20:39	10.7	50.0%	22.2%	44.4%	4.7	0.7	1.3	0.7
Yu Chun-An	3	7:15	1.3	100.0%	0.0%	0.0%	1.7	0.3	0.3	0.0
Mindaugas Kupšas	3	31:46	15.0	59.3%	100.0%	71.4%	9.3	2.0	1.3	2.0
Wu Siao-Jin	2	10:19	6.0	50.0%	66.7%	50.0%	1.0	0.5	0.0	0.0
Chin Ming-Ching	1	1:21	0.0	0.0%	0.0%	0.0%	0.0	0.0	0.0	0.0

- Reference：

== Transactions ==
=== Overview ===
Players added

Via draft

- Su Wen-Ju

Via free agency

- Xavier Alexander
- Jason Brickman
- Ferrakohn Hall
- Hu Long-Mao
- Mindaugas Kupšas
- Lu Wei-Ting
- Negus Webster-Chan
- Yu Chun-An

Transfer from Kaohsiung Jeoutai Technology

- Chen Huai-An
- Chin Ming-Ching
- Li Han-Sheng
- Lin Jen-Hung
- Wu I-Ping
- Wu Siao-Jin
- Yu Huan-Ya
Players lost

=== Trades ===
Date	Trade		Ref.
August 4, 2021	To Kaohsiung Aquas: Cash considerations	To New Taipei CTBC DEA: 2021 Aquas' first-round pick	

=== Transfer from Kaohsiung Jeoutai Technology ===
Date	Player	Ref.
July 17, 2021	Yu Huan-Ya	
July 27, 2021	Wu Siao-Jin	
July 27, 2021	Lin Jen-Hung	
July 28, 2021	Li Han-Sheng	
July 28, 2021	Chen Huai-An	
July 30, 2021	Wu I-Ping	
July 30, 2021	Chin Ming-Ching	

=== Free agency ===
==== Additions ====
Date	Player	Contract terms	Former team	Ref.
June 30, 2021	Yu Chun-An	4-year contract, worth unknown	(Taiwan) Kaohsiung Jeoutai Technology	
July 7, 2021	Lu Wei-Ting	—N/a	(Taiwan) ISU	
August 1, 2021	Hu Long-Mao	—N/a	(China) Fujian Sturgeons	
August 19, 2021	Su Wen-Ju	—N/a	(Taiwan) ISU	
September 10, 2021	Xavier Alexander	—N/a	Singapore Slingers	
September 17, 2021	Ferrakohn Hall	—N/a	(Argentina) Quimsa	
September 24, 2021	Jason Brickman	—N/a	(Philippines) San Miguel Alab Pilipinas	
October 1, 2021	Mindaugas Kupšas	—N/a	(Lithuania) BC Juventus	
March 18, 2022	Negus Webster-Chan	—N/a	(Taiwan) Tainan TSG GhostHawks	

== Awards ==
=== Yearly awards ===
Recipient	Award	Ref.
Jason Brickman	Assists Leader	
Jason Brickman	All-T1 League First Team	
Jason Brickman	Most Valuable Import	
Li Wei-Cheng	General Manager of the Year	
Brendan Joyce	Coach of the Year	
Hu Long-Mao	All-Defensive First Team	
Hu Long-Mao	All-T1 League First Team	
Mindaugas Kupšas	All-Defensive First Team	

=== Finals awards ===
Recipient	Award	Ref.
Kaohsiung Aquas	Champion	
Hu Long-Mao	Finals MVP	

=== Import of the Month ===
Month	Recipient	Award	Ref.
December	Jason Brickman	December Import of the Month	
February	Mindaugas Kupšas	February Import of the Month	
