= List of T1 League arenas =

The following list included all arenas used by teams played in the now-defunct T1 League. Other information included in this list are arena locations, seating capacities, years opened, and years used.

== Arenas ==
Team	Arena	Years used	Capacity	Opened	Location	Ref.
Kaohsiung Aquas (2021–2024)	Fengshan Arena	2022 (playoffs); 2024 (3 games, included 1 playoffs game)	5,317	1977	Kaohsiung City	
Kaohsiung Aquas (2021–2024)	Kaohsiung Arena	2021–2024	15,000	2008	Kaohsiung City	
New Taipei CTBC DEA (2021–2024)	Taipei Dome	2024 (2 games, co-home arena)	15,600	2023	Taipei City	
New Taipei CTBC DEA (2021–2024)	Xinzhuang Gymnasium	2021–2024	6,540	2002	New Taipei City	
Taichung Suns Taichung Wagor Suns (2021–2023)	National Taiwan University of Sport Gymnasium	2021–2023	6,243	1961	Taichung City	
Tainan TSG GhostHawks (2021–2024)	Chia Nan University of Pharmacy and Science Shao Tsung Gymnasium	2021–2024	2,200	2014	Tainan City	
Taipei Mars (2023–2024)	National Taiwan University Sports Center	2024 (2 semifinals games)	4,200	2001	Taipei City	
Taipei Mars (2023–2024)	Taipei Dome	2024 (2 games, co-home arena)	15,600	2023	Taipei City	
Taipei Mars (2023–2024)	Taipei Heping Basketball Gymnasium	2023–2024	7,000	2017	Taipei City	
Taiwan Beer Leopards Taoyuan Leopards (2021–2024)	National Taiwan Sport University Arena	2022–2023	15,537	1986	Taoyuan City	
Taiwan Beer Leopards Taoyuan Leopards (2021–2024)	Taoyuan Arena	2022 (4 games, included 1 play-in game); 2023–2024	8,700	1993	Taoyuan City	
Taiwan Beer Leopards Taoyuan Leopards (2021–2024)	Taipei Heping Basketball Gymnasium	2022 (2 games)	7,000	2017	Taipei City	
Taiwan Beer Leopards Taoyuan Leopards (2021–2024)	Chung Yuan Christian University Gymnasium	2021–2022	3,000	1989	Taoyuan City	
TaiwanBeer HeroBears (2021–2023)	Fu Jen Catholic University Chung Mei Auditorium	2023 (3 games)	2,900	1970	New Taipei City	
TaiwanBeer HeroBears (2021–2023)	Taipei Heping Basketball Gymnasium	2022 (2 games)	7,000	2017	Taipei City	
TaiwanBeer HeroBears (2021–2023)	University of Taipei Tianmu Campus Gymnasium	2021–2023	4,396	2012	Taipei City	

== All-Star Game arena ==
Arena	Years used	Capacity	Opened	Location	Ref.
Taipei Heping Basketball Gymnasium	2023	7,000	2017	Taipei City	

== Preseason arenas ==
Arena	Years used	Capacity	Opened	Location	Ref.
Kaohsiung Arena	2021	15,000	2008	Kaohsiung City	
Xinzhuang Gymnasium	2022, 2023	6,540	2002	New Taipei City	

== Best Home-Court of the Year ==
Since 2022, the league set the Best Home-Court of the Year.

Year	Home court	Team	Ref.
2022	Xinzhuang Gymnasium	New Taipei CTBC DEA	
2023	Xinzhuang Gymnasium	New Taipei CTBC DEA	
2024	Xinzhuang Gymnasium	New Taipei CTBC DEA	

== See also ==
- T1 League
- List of basketball arenas
- List of stadiums in Taiwan
