= 2023 T1 League All-Star Game =

1st edition of the T1 League All-Star Game

Team Beyond	Team Infinity
124	179
	1	2	3	4	Total
Team Beyond	32	25	42	25	124
Team Infinity	53	64	39	23	179
- Date: February 28, 2023
- Venue: Taipei Heping Basketball Gymnasium, Taipei City
- Coaches: Lee Yi-Hua (DEA); Brendan Joyce (Aquas)
- MVP: Dwight Howard (Team Infinity)
- Attendance: 7,000
- Halftime show: Marz23
- Network: Eleven Sports; VL Sports; ELTA TV

The 2023 T1 League All-Star Game was an exhibition game played on February 28, 2023, during the T1 League's 2022–23 season. It was the 1st edition of the T1 League All-Star Game, and was played at Taipei Heping Basketball Gymnasium.

Team Infinity defeated Team Beyond 179–124. Dwight Howard, who scored 37 points, was named the All-Star Game MVP.

== All-Star Game ==
=== Coaches ===
Following the conclusion of the regular season on February 5, 2023, the head coaches were decided. The head coaches of the first and second place in 2022–23 season were qualified as the head coaches of the All-Star Game. The All-Star Game head coaches were announced on February 6. Lee Yi-Hua, head coach of the New Taipei CTBC DEA, qualified as the head coach of Team Beyond. Brendan Joyce, head coach of the Kaohsiung Aquas, qualified as the head coach of Team Infinity.

=== Rosters ===
The team decision was determined by the players' zodiac signs. The players with air or fire sign joined to Team Infinity, and the players with water or earth sign joined to Team Beyond. The rosters for the All-Star Game were selected through a voting process by the fans, head coaches of six teams, and media. Fans made up 60% of the vote, and head coaches and media comprised 40% of the vote. The five backcourt players, three frontcourt players, and five import players who received the highest cumulative vote totals were chosen the All-Star rosters. And the two backcourt players, one frontcourt player, and two import players with highest cumulative vote totals were named the All-Star starters. The players with highest votes of each team were awarded the All-Star Game Most Famous Player.

The All-Star Game rosters were announced on February 1, 2023. Dwight Howard and Mohammad Al Bachir Gadiaga were awarded the All-Star Game Most Famous Player. Chiang Yu-An of the TaiwanBeer HeroBears and Ku Mao Wei-Chia of the Tainan TSG GhostHawks were named the backcourt starters in the Team Infinity. Dwight Howard of the Taoyuan Leopards and Mindaugas Kupšas of the Kaohsiung Aquas were named the import starters in the Team Infinity. Joining the Team Infinity frontcourt starter was Lee Chi-Wei of the TaiwanBeer HeroBears.

Lin Wei-Han of the New Taipei CTBC DEA and Hsieh Ya-Hsuan of the New Taipei CTBC DEA were named the backcourt starters in the Team Beyond. Jason Brickman of the Kaohsiung Aquas and Robert Upshaw of the Tainan TSG GhostHawks were named the import starters in the Team Beyond. Joining the Team Beyond frontcourt starter was Mohammad Al Bachir Gadiaga of the New Taipei CTBC DEA.

After injury was reported from Lin Jen-Hung, the T1 League announced that Yu Chun-An of the Kaohsiung Aquas would replace him as participant in the All-Star Game on February 20.

G	Backcourt player	I	Import player	F	Frontcourt player

Team Infinity
Pos.	Player	Team	No. of selections
Starters
G	Chiang Yu-An	TaiwanBeer HeroBears	1
G	Ku Mao Wei-Chia	Tainan TSG GhostHawks	1
I	**Dwight Howard**	Taoyuan Leopards	1
I	Mindaugas Kupšas	Kaohsiung Aquas	1
F	Lee Chi-Wei	TaiwanBeer HeroBears	1
Reserves
G	Chiu Tzu-Hsuan	Kaohsiung Aquas	1
G	Yu Huan-Ya	Kaohsiung Aquas	1
G	Lu Chieh-Min	Taoyuan Leopards	1
I	Michael Efevberha	Taoyuan Leopards	1
I	Edgaras Želionis	New Taipei CTBC DEA	1
I	Branden Dawson	TaiwanBeer HeroBears	1
F	Lin Jen-Hung^{INJ}	Kaohsiung Aquas	1
F	Chu I-Tsung	TaiwanBeer HeroBears	1
F	Yu Chun-An^{REP}	Kaohsiung Aquas	1
Head coach: Brendan Joyce (Kaohsiung Aquas)

Team Beyond
Pos.	Player	Team	No. of selections
Starters
G	Lin Wei-Han	New Taipei CTBC DEA	1
G	Hsieh Ya-Hsuan	New Taipei CTBC DEA	1
I	Jason Brickman	Kaohsiung Aquas	1
I	Robert Upshaw	Tainan TSG GhostHawks	1
F	**Mohammad Al Bachir Gadiaga**	New Taipei CTBC DEA	1
Reserves
G	Lin Ping-Sheng	New Taipei CTBC DEA	1
G	Tsao Xun-Xiang	TaiwanBeer HeroBears	1
G	Chien Wei-Ju	Tainan TSG GhostHawks	1
I	Kristijan Krajina	New Taipei CTBC DEA	1
I	Aaron Geramipoor	Taichung Suns	1
I	Marlon Johnson	Taichung Suns	1
F	Hu Long-Mao	Kaohsiung Aquas	1
F	Tseng Wen-Ting	New Taipei CTBC DEA	1
Head coach: Lee Yi-Hua (New Taipei CTBC DEA)

Notes

Bold indicates leading vote-getters per team

^INJ Lin Jen-Hung was unable to play due to injury.
^REP Yu Chun-An was selected as Lin Jen-Hung's replacement.

=== Rules ===
In the All-Star Game, participants attempt to get as many points as possible during the first three 12-minute quarters. The fourth quarter is untimed. If one team meets or exceeds the target score (the score of the leading team in total scoring after three quarters plus 22 for representing the number of counties in Taiwan), this team will declare as the winner. There are no personal fouls limit. One team will receive the bonus free throw when the opposing team has accumulated five team fouls in a quarter. Each team can select up to two import players on the court in 1st and 4th quarter, and no import players limit in 2nd and 3rd quarter.

=== Game summary ===
The target score in this game was 178, since Team Infinity was leading 156–99 at the end of the third quarter. Team Infinity defeated Team Beyond 179–124. Dwight Howard, who scored 37 points, was named the All-Star Game MVP.

Eleven Sports
VL Sports
ELTA TV

February 28, 2023
16:40 (UTC+8)

boxscore

Team Beyond	124–**179**	**Team Infinity**
Scoring by quarter: 32–**53**, 25–**64**, **42**–39, **25**–23
Pts: Upshaw 34; Rebs: Lin Wei-Han 7 Asts: Lin Wei-Han, Hsieh Ya-Hsuan 6		Pts: Howard 37; Rebs: Howard 13; Asts: Ku Mao Wei-Chia 9

Taipei Heping Basketball Gymnasium, Taipei City
Attendance: 7,000
Referees: Lan Wei-Hsiung, Lin Chien-Hung, Lin Yu-Hsuan

== Three-Point Contest ==
The Three-Point Contest took place on February 28. The contestants were announced on February 3. Lu Kuan-Hsuan won his first T1 League Three-Point Contest champion by defeating Yu Huan-Ya, Hsieh Ya-Hsuan, and Lee Chi-Wei.

=== Rules ===
In this contest, participants attempt to make as many three-point field goals as possible from five main shooting locations around the three-point line and two big shot zones behind the three-point line in 70 seconds. Ball racks are positioned at five main shooting locations. Four of the racks contain four Regular Balls (each worth one point) and one Money Ball (worth two points). The fifth rack contains five Money Balls and can be placed on any of the five spots of the player's choice. Each big shot zone contains one Big Three (worth three points). The perfect score will be 40 points with shooting 16 Regular Balls, 9 Money Balls, and 2 Big Threes. Players begin shooting from one corner of the court, and move from station to station along the three-point arc until they reach the other corner.

In the qualifying round, each player has a chance to score as many points as possible. The four players with the top scores advance to the final round. The extra qualifications to final round are added when players have same points in qualifying round. The final round is played in the same way as the qualifying round. In the case of a tie, multiple extra rounds of 30 seconds are played to determine the winner. Each player can choose three spots (12 Regular Balls and 3 Money Balls) to finish extra round.

=== Result ===
Contestants
Pos.	Player	Team	First round	Final round
SG	Lu Kuan-Hsuan	Taichung Suns	23	31
PG	Yu Huan-Ya	Kaohsiung Aquas	27	22
SG	Hsieh Ya-Hsuan	New Taipei CTBC DEA	26	22
SG	Lee Chi-Wei	TaiwanBeer HeroBears	22	19
SG	Lu Chieh-Min	Taoyuan Leopards	20	DNQ
C	Dwight Howard	Taoyuan Leopards	15	DNQ
SF	Wu Siao-Jin	Kaohsiung Aquas	13	DNQ
SG	Chien Wei-Ju	Tainan TSG GhostHawks	12	DNQ

== Slam Dunk Contest ==
The Slam Dunk Contest took place on February 28. The contestants were announced on February 3. After personal reason was reported from Mohammad Al Bachir Gadiaga, the T1 League announced that Chang Wei-Hsiang of the Tainan TSG GhostHawks would replace him as participant in the Slam Dunk Contest on February 20. Liu Chun-Ting won his first T1 League Slam Dunk Contest champion by defeating Marlon Johnson.

=== Rules ===
In this contest, participants have two chances to finish dunks. Players need to finish each dunk in 60 seconds. There are five professional judges to score each dunk. Every judge can score from 6 points to 10 points. After finishing second dunk, the audience will judge the player's performance. The perfect score will be 110 points (50 points for each dunk from judges' scores and 10 points from audience's average scores) with finishing 2 dunks.

In the qualifying round, each player has to score as many points as possible. The two players with the top scores advance to the final round. The final round is played in the same way as the qualifying round. In the case of a tie, multiple extra rounds are played to determine the winner. Each player has one chance to finish dunk in 30 seconds during extra round. The player's performance is only scored by professional judges in extra round.

=== Result ===
Contestants
Pos.	Player	Team	First round	Final round
SF	Liu Chun-Ting	Tainan TSG GhostHawks	108.6 (49+50+9.6)	110 (50+50+10.0)
F	Marlon Johnson	Taichung Suns	99 (44+46+9.0)	104.8 (45+50+9.8)
PF	Zhou Cheng-Rui	New Taipei CTBC DEA	83.7 (36+40+7.7)	DNQ
SF	Chang Wei-Hsiang^{ALT}	Tainan TSG GhostHawks	83.1 (39+37+7.1)	DNQ
SF	Mohammad Al Bachir Gadiaga^{OUT}	New Taipei CTBC DEA	DNP	

Notes

^OUT Mohammad Al Bachir Gadiaga was unable to play due to personal reason.
^ALT Chang Wei-Hsiang was selected as Mohammad Al Bachir Gadiaga's replacement.
