= List of TPBL mascots =

The following is a list of mascots of the teams in Taiwan Professional Basketball League (TPBL). Hsinchu Toplus Lioneers and Taoyuan Taiwan Beer Leopards are currently the teams with more than one mascot.

== Current mascots ==
Team	Mascot(s)	Tenures	Photo	Ref.
Formosa Dreamers	Unicorn	2024–present		
Hsinchu Toplus Lioneers	Ready	2024–present		
Hsinchu Toplus Lioneers	Uncle	2024–present		
Kaohsiung Aquas	Brownie	2024–present		
New Taipei CTBC DEA	Thunder	2024–present		
New Taipei Kings	Prince Hiro	2026–present		
Taipei Taishin Mars	Richart	2024–present		
Taoyuan Taiwan Beer Leopards	Bao Ge	2024–present		
Taoyuan Taiwan Beer Leopards	Taiwan Beer Leopard	2024–present		

== Most Popular Mascot of the Year ==
Since 2026, the league set the Most Popular Mascot of the Year.

Year	Mascot	Team	Ref.
2026	Ready	Hsinchu Toplus Lioneers	
