= 2022 T1 League finals =

Taiwanese basketball championship

Team	Coach	Wins
Kaohsiung Aquas	Brendan Joyce	3
Taichung Wagor Suns	Iurgi Caminos	0
- Dates: May 31 – June 4, 2022
- MVP: Hu Long-Mao (Kaohsiung Aquas)

The 2022 T1 League finals was the championship series of the T1 League's 2021–22 season and conclusion of the season's playoffs. The best-of-seven final series was played by the winners of the semifinals series. Due to the COVID-19 pandemic in Taiwan, the finals series changed to best-of-five series. The finals series started on May 31 and ended on June 4. The series was matched by Kaohsiung Aquas and Taichung Wagor Suns. On June 4, the Kaohsiung Aquas defeated the Taichung Wagor Suns, 3–0, winning the 2021–22 season championship. Hu Long-Mao of the Kaohsiung Aquas was named the Finals MVP.

== Bracket ==
Play-in
4	**TaiwanBeer HeroBears**	**2**
5	Taoyuan Leopards	0

Semifinals
1	**Kaohsiung Aquas**	**2**
4	TaiwanBeer HeroBears	0
2	**Taichung Wagor Suns**	**2**
3	New Taipei CTBC DEA	1

Finals
1	**Kaohsiung Aquas**	**3**
2	Taichung Wagor Suns	0

Bold: Series winner
Italic: Team with home-court advantage

== Background ==
=== Road to the finals ===
Kaohsiung Aquas (1st seed)		Taichung Wagor Suns (2nd seed)
Team / GP / W / L / PCT / GB; **Kaohsiung Aquas** / 30 / 23 / 7 / .767 / —; Taichung Wagor Suns / 30 / 20 / 10 / .667 / 3; New Taipei CTBC DEA / 30 / 17 / 13 / .567 / 6; TaiwanBeer HeroBears / 30 / 16 / 14 / .533 / 7; Taoyuan Leopards / 30 / 8 / 22 / .267 / 15; Tainan TSG GhostHawks / 30 / 6 / 24 / .200 / 17	Regular season	Team / GP / W / L / PCT / GB; Kaohsiung Aquas / 30 / 23 / 7 / .767 / —; **Taichung Wagor Suns** / 30 / 20 / 10 / .667 / 3; New Taipei CTBC DEA / 30 / 17 / 13 / .567 / 6; TaiwanBeer HeroBears / 30 / 16 / 14 / .533 / 7; Taoyuan Leopards / 30 / 8 / 22 / .267 / 15; Tainan TSG GhostHawks / 30 / 6 / 24 / .200 / 17
No need to play play-in series	Play-in	No need to play play-in series
Defeated the 4th seed TaiwanBeer HeroBears, 2–0	Semifinals	Defeated the 3rd seed New Taipei CTBC DEA, 2–1

=== Regular season series ===
The Aquas won 4–2 in the regular-season series.

December 19, 2021

boxscore

Taichung Wagor Suns	81–**92**	**Kaohsiung Aquas**

Kaohsiung Arena, Kaohsiung City

December 26, 2021

boxscore

Kaohsiung Aquas	88–**93**	**Taichung Wagor Suns**

National Taiwan University of Sport Gymnasium, Taichung City

January 28, 2022

boxscore

**Taichung Wagor Suns**	**104**–89	Kaohsiung Aquas

Kaohsiung Arena, Kaohsiung City

February 12, 2022

boxscore

Taichung Wagor Suns	71–**87**	**Kaohsiung Aquas**

Kaohsiung Arena, Kaohsiung City

February 28, 2022

boxscore

**Kaohsiung Aquas**	**122**–113 (OT)	Taichung Wagor Suns

National Taiwan University of Sport Gymnasium, Taichung City

March 13, 2022

boxscore

**Kaohsiung Aquas**	**98**–81	Taichung Wagor Suns

National Taiwan University of Sport Gymnasium, Taichung City

== Series summary ==
Game	Date	Away team	Result	Home team
Game 1	May 31	Taichung Wagor Suns	99–**101** (0–1)	**Kaohsiung Aquas**
Game 2	June 2	Taichung Wagor Suns	82–**112** (0–2)	**Kaohsiung Aquas**
Game 3	June 4	**Kaohsiung Aquas**	**103**–100 (3–0)	Taichung Wagor Suns

== Game summaries ==
=== Game 1 ===
Eleven Sports
ELTA TV

May 31, 2022
19:00 (UTC+8)

boxscore

Taichung Wagor Suns	99–**101**	**Kaohsiung Aquas**
Scoring by quarter: 24–**28**, 30–**32**, 22–**33**, **23**–8
Pts: Tucker 33; Rebs: Geramipoor 12; Asts: Tucker 9		Pts: Hu Long-Mao 26; Rebs: Kupšas 10; Asts: Brickman 14
**Aquas leads series, 1–0**

Fengshan Arena, Kaohsiung City
Referees: Yu Jung, Ho Chang-Jen, Su Yu-Yen

=== Game 2 ===
Eleven Sports
ELTA TV

June 2, 2022
19:00 (UTC+8)

boxscore

Taichung Wagor Suns	82–**112**	**Kaohsiung Aquas**
Scoring by quarter: 15–**33**, **29**–26, 22–**30**, 16–**23**
Pts: Sakakini, Su Yi-Chin 19; Rebs: Sakakini 10; Asts: Tucker 7		Pts: Hu Long-Mao 38; Rebs: Alexander 8 Asts: Brickman 13
**Aquas leads series, 2–0**

Fengshan Arena, Kaohsiung City
Referees: Chen Ying-Cheng, Wei Sheng-Hsuan, Lin Chien-Hung

=== Game 3 ===
Eleven Sports
ELTA TV

June 4, 2022
14:00 (UTC+8)

boxscore

**Kaohsiung Aquas**	**103**–100	Taichung Wagor Suns
Scoring by quarter: **23**–22, **31**–27, 23–**30**, **26**–21
Pts: Brickman 23; Rebs: Kupšas 11; Asts: Brickman 9		Pts: Tucker 34; Rebs: Geramipoor 8 Asts: Tucker, Su Yi-Chin 3
**Aquas wins T1 League finals, 3–0**

National Taiwan University of Sport Gymnasium, Taichung City
Referees: Wu Chien-Wu, Yu Jung, Chen Ying-Cheng

== Rosters ==
=== Kaohsiung Aquas ===
2021–22 Kaohsiung Aquas roster
Players
Coaches

Pos.	No.	Nat.	Name	Ht.	Wt.	Age	From
PG	4	(Taiwan)	Li Han-Sheng	1.77 m (5 ft 10 in)	76 kg (168 lb)	27 – 24 October 1994	NTNU
PG	5	(Philippines) (United States)	Jason Brickman **(AI)**	1.79 m (5 ft 10 in)	79 kg (174 lb)	30 – 19 November 1991	LIU Brooklyn
PG	7	(Taiwan)	Yu Huan-Ya	1.82 m (6 ft 0 in)	80 kg (176 lb)	28 – 30 November 1993	NTNU
PG	9	(Taiwan)	Chen Huai-An	1.86 m (6 ft 1 in)	90 kg (198 lb)	25 – 29 April 1997	NTUA
SF	10	(Taiwan)	Hu Long-Mao	1.95 m (6 ft 5 in)	97 kg (214 lb)	29 – 22 December 1992	Chaminade
SF	12	(Taiwan)	Lin Jen-Hung	1.94 m (6 ft 4 in)	88 kg (194 lb)	28 – 18 December 1993	NTNU
SF	14	(Canada)	Negus Webster-Chan **(I)**	2.01 m (6 ft 7 in)	89 kg (196 lb)	29 – 7 January 1993	Hawaiʻi
SF	15	(United States)	Xavier Alexander **(I)**	1.98 m (6 ft 6 in)	102 kg (225 lb)	33 – 19 October 1988	Southern Nazarene
PF	18	(Taiwan)	Wu I-Ping	2.00 m (6 ft 7 in)	90 kg (198 lb)	29 – 29 August 1992	ISU
C	21	(Taiwan)	Lu Wei-Ting	2.00 m (6 ft 7 in)	100 kg (220 lb)	25 – 16 April 1997	ISU
SG	24	(Taiwan)	Su Wen-Ju	1.87 m (6 ft 2 in)	80 kg (176 lb)	24 – 16 October 1997	ISU
PF	25	(United States)	Ferrakohn Hall **(I)**	2.03 m (6 ft 8 in)	107 kg (236 lb)	31 – 20 September 1990	Memphis
SG	28	(Taiwan)	Yu Chun-An **(C)**	1.89 m (6 ft 2 in)	83 kg (183 lb)	30 – 13 February 1992	NTNU
C	49	(Lithuania)	Mindaugas Kupšas **(I)**	2.17 m (7 ft 1 in)	122 kg (269 lb)	31 – 9 April 1991	LSU
SF	57	(Taiwan)	Wu Siao-Jin	1.90 m (6 ft 3 in)	83 kg (183 lb)	26 – 28 August 1995	NKNU
PF	85	(Taiwan)	Chin Ming-Ching	1.95 m (6 ft 5 in)	110 kg (243 lb)	27 – 14 November 1994	NTNU

Head coach

- (Australia) Brendan Joyce

Assistant coach(es)

- (Taiwan) Zhu Yong-Hong
- (Taiwan) Peng Te-Hsuan

Athletic trainer(s)

- (Taiwan) Duan Yi

Team manager

- (Taiwan) Wang De-Yao

Legend

- **(C)** Team captain
- **(I)** Import player
- **(AI)** Asian import player
- Injured

- Roster
Updated: March 18, 2022

=== Taichung Wagor Suns ===
2021–22 Taichung Wagor Suns roster
Players
Coaches

Pos.	No.	Nat.	Name	Ht.	Wt.	Age	From
PG	0	(United States)	Anthony Tucker **(I)**	1.93 m (6 ft 4 in)	93 kg (205 lb)	32 – 2 September 1989	Minnesota
SG	1	(Taiwan)	Yang Cheng-Han	1.86 m (6 ft 1 in)	77 kg (170 lb)	22 – 10 October 1999	FJU
PG	3	(Taiwan)	Ting Sheng-Ju	1.74 m (5 ft 9 in)	70 kg (154 lb)	23 – 22 August 1998	St. Francis
PG	4	(Taiwan)	Kao Meng-Wei	1.75 m (5 ft 9 in)	70 kg (154 lb)	25 – 13 September 1996	NTCUST
PG	5	(Taiwan)	Li Ping-Hung	1.83 m (6 ft 0 in)	80 kg (176 lb)	32 – 3 November 1989	NTNU
PG	7	(Taiwan)	Chou Tzu-Hua	1.83 m (6 ft 0 in)	92 kg (203 lb)	34 – 4 October 1987	FJU
SF	8	(Taiwan)	Chen Wen-Hung	1.88 m (6 ft 2 in)	80 kg (176 lb)	30 – 14 July 1991	NTSU
PF	9	(Philippines)	Niño Canaleta **(AI)**	1.98 m (6 ft 6 in)	91 kg (201 lb)	40 – 12 February 1982	UE
SF	12	(Taiwan)	Chiu Po-Chang	1.89 m (6 ft 2 in)	91 kg (201 lb)	26 – 2 November 1995	NTUA
PF	13	(Palestine)	Sani Sakakini **(I)**	2.04 m (6 ft 8 in)	108 kg (238 lb)	33 – 19 August 1988	JUST
SG	15	(Philippines) (Australia)	Jordan Heading **(AI)**	1.88 m (6 ft 2 in)	86 kg (190 lb)	26 – 30 January 1996	California Baptist
C	18	(Taiwan)	Sun Szu-Yao	2.05 m (6 ft 9 in)	100 kg (220 lb)	24 – 3 October 1997	NYIT
SF	23	(Taiwan)	Chen Ching-Huan **(C)**	1.90 m (6 ft 3 in)	84 kg (185 lb)	36 – 3 February 1986	FJU
PF	30	(United States)	Julian Wright **(I)**	2.03 m (6 ft 8 in)	107 kg (236 lb)	35 – 20 May 1987	Kansas
C	32	(United Kingdom) (Iran)	Aaron Geramipoor **(I)**	2.13 m (7 ft 0 in)	123 kg (271 lb)	29 – 11 September 1992	Seton Hall
PF	41	(Taiwan)	Su Yi-Chin	2.00 m (6 ft 7 in)	96 kg (212 lb)	28 – 29 December 1993	MDU
PF	68	(Taiwan)	Yu Chu-Hsiang	2.00 m (6 ft 7 in)	88 kg (194 lb)	22 – 16 June 1999	SHU

Head coach

- (Spain) Iurgi Caminos

Assistant coach(es)

- (Spain) Alberto Garcia
- (Taiwan) Chou Ying-Chou

Strength & conditioning coach(es)

- (Taiwan) Hsieh Meng-Hung

Team manager

- (Taiwan) Wang Wei-Chieh

Legend

- **(C)** Team captain
- **(I)** Import player
- **(AI)** Asian import player
- Injured

- Roster
Updated: March 23, 2022

== Player statistics ==
Legend
GP	Games played	MPG	Minutes per game	2P%	2-point field goal percentage
3P%	3-point field goal percentage	FT%	Free throw percentage	RPG	Rebounds per game
APG	Assists per game	SPG	Steals per game	BPG	Blocks per game
PPG	Points per game		Finals MVP

=== Kaohsiung Aquas ===
Player	GP	MPG	PPG	2P%	3P%	FT%	RPG	APG	SPG	BPG
Li Han-Sheng	3	7:49	0.7	0.0%	0.0%	100.0%	1.0	1.3	1.0	0.0
Jason Brickman	3	39:08	17.7	37.5%	47.8%	80.0%	7.0	12.0	2.0	0.0
Yu Huan-Ya	3	37:18	11.0	71.4%	35.3%	100.0%	3.3	1.7	0.7	0.3
Chen Huai-An	1	1:46	0.0	0.0%	0.0%	0.0%	0.0	0.0	0.0	0.0
Hu Long-Mao	3	25:36	21.3	50.0%	47.4%	84.6%	2.7	3.0	1.7	0.0
Lin Jen-Hung	3	31:56	8.3	66.7%	44.4%	100.0%	2.0	2.3	0.7	0.0
Negus Webster-Chan	Did not play									
Xavier Alexander	3	18:12	7.7	45.5%	28.6%	87.5%	6.0	1.7	0.0	0.0
Wu I-Ping	3	11:47	7.7	83.3%	50.0%	66.7%	1.0	0.7	0.7	0.0
Lu Wei-Ting	1	1:46	0.0	0.0%	0.0%	0.0%	0.0	0.0	0.0	0.0
Su Wen-Ju	Did not play									
Ferrakohn Hall	3	20:39	10.7	50.0%	22.2%	44.4%	4.7	0.7	1.3	0.7
Yu Chun-An	3	7:15	1.3	100.0%	0.0%	0.0%	1.7	0.3	0.3	0.0
Mindaugas Kupšas	3	31:46	15.0	59.3%	100.0%	71.4%	9.3	2.0	1.3	2.0
Wu Siao-Jin	2	10:19	6.0	50.0%	66.7%	50.0%	1.0	0.5	0.0	0.0
Chin Ming-Ching	1	1:21	0.0	0.0%	0.0%	0.0%	0.0	0.0	0.0	0.0

=== Taichung Wagor Suns ===
Player	GP	MPG	PPG	2P%	3P%	FT%	RPG	APG	SPG	BPG
Anthony Tucker	3	36:18	27.0	45.2%	43.3%	87.5%	7.0	6.3	2.7	0.7
Yang Cheng-Han	Did not play									
Ting Sheng-Ju	3	31:21	8.0	33.3%	40.0%	75.0%	1.3	3.0	1.3	0.0
Kao Meng-Wei	Did not play									
Li Ping-Hung	2	4:08	0.0	0.0%	0.0%	0.0%	0.5	0.0	0.0	0.0
Chou Tzu-Hua	Did not play									
Chen Wen-Hung	3	21:42	4.7	50.0%	36.4%	0.0%	1.7	0.3	0.3	0.3
Niño Canaleta	1	18:47	11.0	100.0%	60.0%	0.0%	1.0	1.0	0.0	0.0
Chiu Po-Chang	2	10:32	3.0	60.0%	0.0%	0.0%	0.5	0.5	0.5	0.0
Sani Sakakini	2	22:41	14.5	38.9%	0.0%	83.3%	8.0	2.0	0.5	0.5
Jordan Heading	2	24:43	5.0	37.5%	0.0%	100.0%	1.0	3.0	0.0	0.0
Sun Szu-Yao	3	10:44	3.3	83.3%	0.0%	0.0%	2.7	0.0	0.3	0.7
Chen Ching-Huan	3	29:15	3.3	50.0%	14.3%	60.0%	2.7	1.7	0.0	0.0
Julian Wright	1	12:05	2.0	50.0%	0.0%	0.0%	3.0	3.0	1.0	0.0
Aaron Geramipoor	3	30:25	15.3	70.0%	0.0%	57.1%	7.0	1.3	1.0	0.0
Su Yi-Chin	3	28:31	12.7	55.0%	33.3%	77.8%	5.7	2.0	0.7	0.7
Yu Chu-Hsiang	Did not play									

- Reference：
