= Bachir Gadiaga =

Taiwanese basketball player (born 1998)

Mohammad Al Bachir Gadiaga
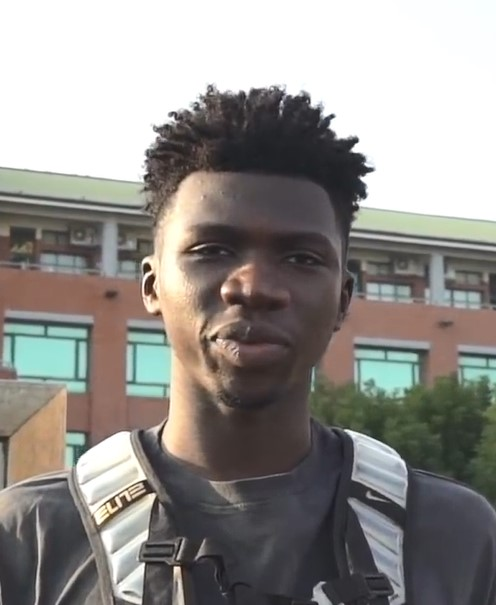
- Al Bachir in 2021

No. 0 – New Taipei CTBC DEA
- Position: Shooting guard / small forward
- League: Taiwan Professional Basketball League

Personal information
- Born: April 27, 1998 (age 28) Chiba, Japan
- Listed height: 189 cm (6 ft 2 in)
- Listed weight: 92 kg (203 lb)

Career information
- College: Shih Hsin (2018–2021)
- T1 League draft: 2021: 1st round
- Drafted by: New Taipei CTBC DEA
- Playing career: 2021–present

Career history
- 2021–2024: New Taipei CTBC DEA
- 2024–2025: Akita Northern Happinets
- 2025–present: New Taipei CTBC DEA

Career highlights
- T1 League champion (2023); 2× T1 League MVP (2023, 2024); All-TPBL First Team (2026); 3× All-T1 League First Team (2022–2024); TPBL All-Defensive First Team (2026); T1 League All-Defensive First Team (2024); T1 League Rookie of the Year (2022); T1 League Most Popular Player of the Year (2023); T1 League All-Star (2023); T1 League All-Star Game Most Famous Player (2023)

Mohammad Al Bachir Gadiaga (born April 27, 1998), also known as Al Bachir (Note: sometimes spelled Bachir or Abbasi) (Chinese: 阿巴西), is a Senegalese-Taiwanese professional basketball player for the New Taipei CTBC DEA of the Taiwan Professional Basketball League (TPBL).

== Early life and education ==
Mohammad Al Bachir Gadiaga was born on April 27, 1998, in Chiba, Japan. He was born to a Senegalese father and an American mother from California. Al Bachir was the eldest son in a family of eight children.

Al Bachir lived in Japan for three years, before moving to Senegal. He played football for leisure. He moved to Taiwan when he was eight years old due to his parents' employment.

Al Bachir attended New Taipei Municipal Taishan Junior High School. While he was not part of the school's basketball team due to him being too old, he practiced with the team. He later attended Shih Hsin University and was part of the institution's basketball team.

== Professional career ==
=== New Taipei CTBC DEA ===
On August 9, 2021, Al Bachir was drafted first round in the 2021 T1 League draft by the New Taipei CTBC DEA. On August 26, Al Bachir signed with the New Taipei CTBC DEA of the T1 League. For the purpose of the T1 League's foreign player quota system, Al Bachir is treated as a local Taiwanese player.

Al Bachir was named as Most Valuable Player (MVP) in 2022–23 season. And he awarded MVP again in the 2023–24 season

On June 11, 2024, New Taipei CTBC DEA announced that Al Bachir has left the team, executing a contract clause to go overseas.

=== Akita Northern Happinets ===
On June 17, 2024, Al Bachir signed a two-year contract with the Akita Northern Happinets of the B.League, with his roster spot counting under Asian special quota. He became the first Taiwanese player to join the B.League first division team. On May 30, 2025, Akita Northern Happinets terminated the contract relationship with Al Bachir.

=== Return to New Taipei CTBC DEA ===
On June 13, 2025, Al Bachir returned to New Taipei CTBC DEA of the Taiwan Professional Basketball League (TPBL) on a 3+2-year contract.

On May 9, 2026, Al Bachir was selected to the All-Defensive First Team of the TPBL in 2025–26 season. On May 11, Al Bachir was selected to the All-TPBL First Team in 2025–26 season.

== National team career ==
Al Bachir has been a player of the Chinese Taipei national team since 2021. From 2023, he has been considered as a local player under FIBA eligibility rules. This enabled Al Bachir to be fielded simultaneously with American-born Brandon Gilbeck for Chinese Taipei.

== Personal life ==
Al Bachir speaks and writes in fluent Chinese.
