= Ferrakohn Hall =

American basketball player

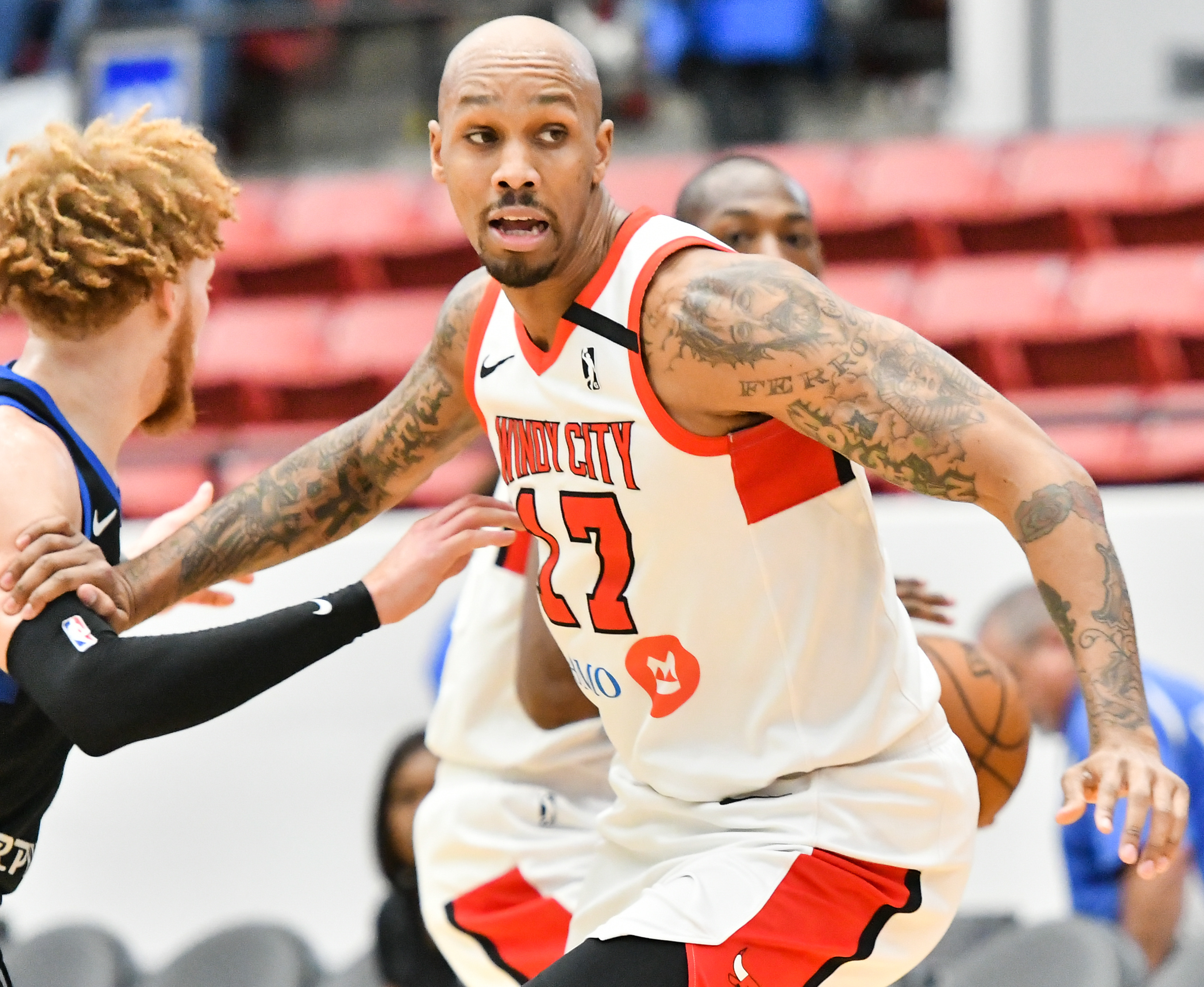

Personal information
- Born: September 20, 1990 (age 36) Memphis, Tennessee, U.S.
- Listed height: 6 ft 8 in (2.03 m)
- Listed weight: 220 lb (100 kg)

Career information
- High school: White Station (Memphis, Tennessee)
- College: Seton Hall (2009–2011); Memphis (2011–2013)
- NBA draft: 2013: undrafted
- Playing career: 2013–2022
- Position: Center

Career history
- 2013: Værløse Blue Hawks
- 2013–2014: BK Lions Jindřichův Hradec
- 2014–2015: Iowa Energy
- 2015–2016: Al-Ittihad
- 2016: Santa Cruz Warriors
- 2016–2017: Windy City Bulls
- 2017–2018: Saitama Broncos
- 2018–2020: Windy City Bulls
- 2021: Quimsa
- 2021–2022: Kaohsiung Aquas

Career highlights
- T1 League champion (2022)

Ferrakohn Edward Hall (born September 20, 1990) is an American professional basketball player. He played college basketball for Seton Hall and Memphis.

== Professional career ==
During the 2017–18 season, he competed for the Saitama Broncos of the Japanese B.League. In October 2018, Hall was added to the training camp roster of the Windy City Bulls of the NBA G League. He re-signed with the team in 2019.

On January 26, 2021, Hall signed with Quimsa of the Liga Nacional de Básquet.

On September 17, 2021, Hall signed with Kaohsiung Aquas of the T1 League.
