= 2021 T1 League draft =

1st edition of the T1 League draft

General information
- Sport: Basketball
- Date: August 9, 2021
- Networks: T1 League on YouTube; T1 League on Facebook; Line Today

Overview
- 17 total selections in 5 rounds
- League: T1 League
- First selection: No picking order in this draft

The 2021 T1 League draft was the first edition of the T1 League's annual draft. It was held online on July 28, 2021 originally and broadcast on YouTube, Facebook, and Line Today. Due to the COVID-19 pandemic in Taiwan, the draft was postponed to August 9. There were six teams joined the draft, including the Kaohsiung Aquas, New Taipei CTBC DEA, Taichung Suns, (Note: The team participated in the draft with the name of Taichung Suns on August 9, 2021. The team changed name to Taichung Wagor Suns on November 25.) Tainan team, (Note: The team participated in the draft with the name of Tainan on August 9, 2021. The name of Tainan team was announced as Tainan TSG GhostHawks on September 30.) Taiwan Beer, (Note: The team participated in the draft with the name of Taiwan Beer on August 9, 2021. And Taiwan Beer had given up their draft right on the first round. The name was announced as TaiwanBeer HeroBears on September 2.) and the Taoyuan Leopards. There were 58 players participated in the draft, and 17 players were chosen in 5 rounds.

== First Round Contested Picks ==
	Player name	Position	Teams selected by
First Round	Yu Chu-Hsiang	PF/C	**Suns**, Tainan

- **Bolded** team indicate who won the right to negotiate contract.
- The Tainan team chose Lan Shao-Fu after the first round contested picks.

== Draft results ==
G	Guard	SG	Shooting guard	F	Forward	SF	Small forward	PF	Power forward	C	Center

^{*}	Denotes player who has been selected for at least one All-Star Game and All-T1 League Team
^{+}	Denotes player who has been selected for at least one All-Star Game
^{#}	Denotes player who has never appeared in one T1 regular season or playoff game
^{~}	Denotes player who has been selected as Rookie of the Year

Rnd.	Player	Pos.	Team	School / club team
1	Mohammad Al Bachir Gadiaga^{*~}	SG	New Taipei CTBC DEA (from Aquas) (Note: August 4, 2021: Kaohsiung Aquas to New Taipei CTBC DEA: DEA acquired 2021 first-round pick; Aquas acquired cash considerations)	SHU (Jr.)
1	Hsieh Ya-Hsuan^{+}	G/SF	New Taipei CTBC DEA (from Aquas)	UCH (Sr.)
1	Lo Chen-Feng	SF	Taoyuan Leopards	NKNU
1	Yu Chu-Hsiang	PF/C	Taichung Suns	SHU (Sr.)
1	Lan Shao-Fu	PF/C	Tainan	NTSU
2	Wei Chia-Hao	G	New Taipei CTBC DEA	FJU (Jr.)
2	Huang Yi-Sheng	SG	Taoyuan Leopards	SHU
2	Yang Cheng-Han	SG	Taichung Suns	FJU (Jr.)
2	Su Chih-Cheng^{#}	G	Tainan	NTSU (Sr.)
2	Su Wen-Ju	SG/SF	Kaohsiung Aquas	ISU (M.A.)
3	Tung Fang Yi-Kang	G	New Taipei CTBC DEA	Salesian High School
3	Chang Shun-Cheng	SG/F	Taoyuan Leopards	UKN
3	Lin Tzu-Feng	SG/SF	Tainan	UCH (Sr.)
4	Liu Min-Yan	F/C	New Taipei CTBC DEA	NKNU (So.)
4	Liu Chun-Ting	SG/SF	Tainan	UCH (Sr.)
5	Zhou Cheng-Rui	PF	New Taipei CTBC DEA	CCU (Jr.)
5	Wu Nien-Che^{#}	SG	Tainan	NTUST (Sr.)

- Reference：

== Draft combine ==
The T1 League invited all entrants and free agents to join the draft combine. The draft combine was held on July 26, 2021 originally. The draft combine was postponed to August 2 and held at National Taiwan University of Sport. There were 65 players participated in the draft combine.

== Entrants ==
The T1 League released its official list of entrants on July 24, 2021, consisting of 58 players from college and other educational institutions in this edition of the draft.

- (Taiwan) Mohammad Al Bachir Gadiaga – SG, SHU
- (Taiwan) Chang Shao-Chun – PF, NTUST
- (Taiwan) Chang Shun-Cheng – SG/F, UKN
- (Taiwan) Chen Cheng-Hsuan – F, CCUT
- (Taiwan) Chen Hsiao-Yu – G, ISU
- (Taiwan) Chen Tsung-Hsien – G, HDUT
- (Taiwan) Chen Yu-Wei – G, NTSU
- (Taiwan) Cheng Chen-Wei – G, KSHS
- (Taiwan) Cheng Tzu-Feng – G/SF, CCUT
- (Taiwan) Chiu Chung-Po – SF, ISU
- (Taiwan) Du Szu-Han – G, UT
- (Taiwan) Peter Guinchard – G, France NM3
- (Taiwan) Hsiao Shao-Ting – G/SF, J.N. Burnett
- (Taiwan) Hsieh Ya-Hsuan – G/SF, UCH
- (Taiwan) Huang Kai-Chieh – SG/SF, UKN
- (Taiwan) Huang Szu-Han – PG, KYVS
- (Taiwan) Huang Yi-Sheng – SG, SHU
- (Taiwan) Kao Hao-Yu – SG/SF, NRVS
- (Taiwan) Lan Shao-Fu – PF/C, NTSU
- (Taiwan) Lee Cheng-Wei – G, UPIKE
- (Taiwan) Lee Mo-Fan – F, NTUS
- (Taiwan) Lin Chun-En – G, UT
- (Taiwan) Lin Shih-Hsuan – G, NTNU
- (Taiwan) Lin Tzu-Feng – SG/SF, UCH
- (Taiwan) Liu Chun-Ting – SG/SF, UCH
- (Taiwan) Liu Hsuan-Yu – G, Magee
- (Taiwan) Liu Min-Yan – F/C, NKNU
- (Taiwan) Lo Chen-Feng – SF, NKNU
- (Taiwan) Su Chih-Cheng – G, NTSU
- (Taiwan) Su Po-Hsuan – SG, MDU
- (Taiwan) Su Wen-Ju – SG/SF, ISU
- (Taiwan) Tao Chun – SG/F, NTSU
- (Taiwan) Tsao Li-Chung – SF, NKNU
- (Taiwan) Tseng Yu-Hao – PF, NCCU
- (Taiwan) Tung Fang Yi-Kang – G, Salesian High School
- (Taiwan) Wang Chen-Yuan – PG, NCCU
- (Taiwan) Wang Hsin-Wei – SG, VNU
- (Taiwan) Wang Hung-Hao – G, UT
- (Taiwan) Wei Chia-Hao – G, FJU
- (Taiwan) Wen Cheng-Wei – F, NTUST
- (Taiwan) Wu Nien-Che – SG, NTUST
- (Taiwan) Yan Wen-Tso – SG/SF, NTUST
- (Taiwan) Yang Cheng-Han – SG, FJU
- (Taiwan) Yang Tzu-Yi – PG, HDUT
- (Taiwan) Yu Chu-Hsiang – PF/C, SHU
- (Taiwan) Zhou Cheng-Rui – PF, CCU
- (Taiwan) Zhu En-Lin – SG/F, TSU

=== Club team recommendation ===
- (Taiwan) Chiang Chih-Sheng – F
- (Taiwan) Chuang Yu-Heng – G
- (Taiwan) Chung Jen-Kuang – SG/SF
- (Taiwan) Ho Chia-Chun – G
- (Taiwan) Hsu Shih-Hung – SF
- (Taiwan) Huang Yu-Chieh – SG/SF
- (Taiwan) Lan Zhen-Yi – PG
- (Taiwan) Lin Kang-Yi – PG
- (Taiwan) Shih Hsin-Hung – SF
- (Taiwan) Wang Sheng-Hsiang – G
- (Taiwan) Zhou Chen-Wei – G
