= Jason Brickman =

Filipino-American basketball player

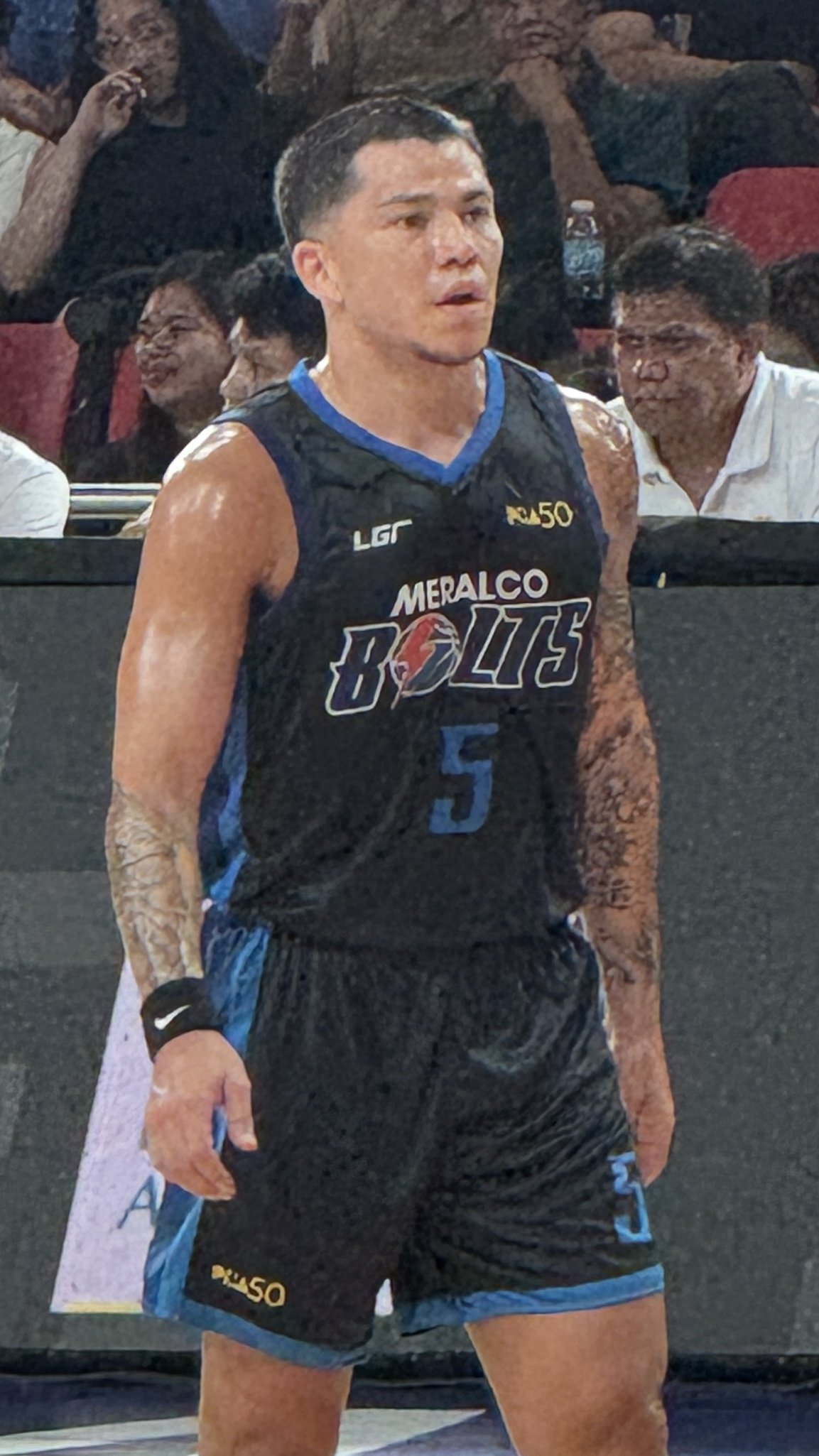
- Brickman with the Meralco Bolts in 2026

No. 5 – Meralco Bolts
- Position: Point guard
- League: PBA

Personal information
- Born: November 19, 1991 (age 35) San Antonio, Texas, U.S.
- Listed height: 5 ft 10 in (179 cm)
- Listed weight: 165 lb (75 kg)

Career information
- High school: Tom C. Clark (San Antonio, Texas)
- College: LIU Brooklyn (2010–2014)
- NBA draft: 2014: undrafted
- PBA draft: 2025: 1st round, 7th overall pick
- Drafted by: Meralco Bolts
- Playing career: 2014–present

Career history
- 2014: Dynamo Moscow
- 2015: Medi Bayreuth
- 2015–2016: Westports Malaysia Dragons
- 2016–2019: Mono Vampire
- 2019: Hi-Tech Bangkok City
- 2019–2020: San Miguel Alab Pilipinas
- 2021–2024: Kaohsiung Aquas
- 2025: Abra Solid North Weavers
- 2026–present: Meralco Bolts

Career highlights
- T1 League champion (2022); T1 League All-Star (2023); T1 League Most Valuable Import (2022); 2× All-T1 League First Team (2022, 2023); 2× T1 League assists leader (2022, 2024); 3× TBSL champion (2017–2019); ABL champion (2016); ABL Finals MVP (2016); MPBL champion (2025); MPBL Finals Most Valuable Player (2025); 2× NCAA assists leader (2013, 2014); First-team All-NEC (2014); 3× William Jones Cup champion (2016, 2019, 2025)

Jason Alexander Brickman (born November 19, 1991) is a Filipino-American basketball player for the Meralco Bolts of the Philippine Basketball Association (PBA). He completed his college career for the Long Island University Blackbirds after the 2013–14 season. Brickman was considered as one of the best passers in the NCAA, having led Division I in assists per game in 2013 and 2014. He is one of only five players in Division I history to record 1,000 assists.

He started his professional career in Europe, first with BC Dynamo Moscow in Russia and Medi Bayreuth in Germany before playing in Thailand from 2015 to 2019. In 2019, he moved to San Miguel Alab Pilipinas. From 2021 to 2024, he played for the Kaohsiung Aquas of the T1 League and later the Taiwan Professional Basketball League (TPBL) before returning to Philippine basketball in 2025 with the Abra Solid North Weavers of the Maharlika Pilipinas Basketball League (MPBL). In 2025, at age 33, he was drafted by the Meralco Bolts with the seventh pick of the PBA season 50 draft.

Across all pro leagues, Brickman won a total of six championships, three in the Thailand Basketball Super League, and one each in the ASEAN Basketball League, T1 League, and MPBL.

== High school career ==
Brickman played prep basketball at Tom C. Clark High School in San Antonio, Texas. In his senior season he led Clark to a District 28-5A championship behind the strength of a 29–7 record. He was named the district's most valuable player, earned first team all-district honors and also earned Class 5A All-State honors from the Texas Association of Basketball Coaches.

== College career ==
=== Freshman season ===
In the fall of 2010 Brickman began his collegiate career for Long Island. As a freshman in 2010–11 he averaged 5.5 assists per game, led the Northeast Conference (NEC) in total assists (180) and in assists-per-turnover ratio (2.81). The 180 assists were the fourth-highest season assist total in school history. He also helped lead Long Island to a berth in the 2011 NCAA Tournament, and in a first round loss to North Carolina, Brickman recorded eight assists and two steals. Then-head coach Jim Ferry claimed Brickman was the "John Stockton" to their team. At the end of the season he was named the NEC Rookie of the Year by the NIT and Metropolitan Basketball Writers Association as well as being selected to the NEC All-Rookie and All-Tournament teams.

=== Sophomore season ===
The Blackbirds earned a second consecutive berth to the NCAA Tournament behind Brickman and NEC Player of the Year Julian Boyd. Brickman's 7.3 assists per game ranked fifth nationally while his 249 total assists set a new school record. He was chosen as a Second Team All-Conference performer while also repeating as an All-NEC Tournament selection; in the NEC championship, Brickman scored 18 points and dished out 11 assists against Robert Morris, thus clinching their automatic 2012 NCAA Tournament berth. Long Island lost to Michigan State in the first round.

=== Junior season ===
Brickman led NCAA Division I in assists per game with an 8.50 average. He managed this despite Long Island losing reigning NEC Player of the Year Julian Boyd to an ACL injury in December 2012 that sidelined him for the entire season.

=== Senior season ===
On February 17, 2014, Brickman was named one of the 23 finalists for the Bob Cousy Award, given annually to the best point guard in Division I men's basketball. In his final college game, played on March 1, 2014, Brickman became only the fourth men's player in Division I history to collect 1,000 career assists, finishing with 1,009. He also became only the second Division I men's player to average double figures in points and assists in the same season, after Avery Johnson of Southern in 1987–88.

== Professional career ==
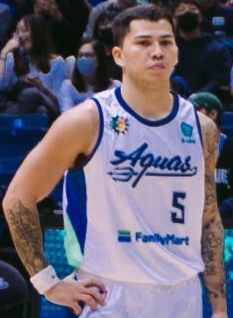
Brickman with the Kaohsiung Aquas in 2023

In June 2014, he signed a contract to play for Dynamo Moscow in the Russian Basketball Super League where he averaged 2 points and 2.8 assists in 8 Superleague games. On December 2, 2014, he chose to leave Dynamo.

On January 23, 2015, Brickman signed with Medi Bayreuth of the Basketball Bundesliga. On April 6, he parted ways with the German team after averaging 7.5 points and 4.8 assists in 11 games.

In 2015, the Westports Malaysia Dragons signed Brickman being a Filipino as one of their two ASEAN imports in the ASEAN Basketball League. As a member of the Dragons in 2016, he won a championship and was named Finals MVP.

In June 2016, Brickman signed with Mono Vampire Basketball Club of the GSB Thailand Basketball Super League and Thailand Basketball League.

Brickman averaged 12.8 points on a 43-percent shooting from the field, to go with 8.9 assists, 4.5 rebounds, and 1.8 steals in his 13 games last season with Mono Vampire.

The Fil-Am guard also played for Hi-Tech Bangkok City in the Thailand Super Basketball League (TBSL), where he netted 11.5 points, 8.8 assists, 3.9 rebounds, and 1.8 steals this past season.

In 2019, Brickman played for Mighty Sports in both the 2019 Dubai International Basketball Championship and in the 2019 William Jones Cup.

On October 16, 2019, Brickman signed with the San Miguel Alab Pilipinas for the 2019–20 ABL season.

On September 24, 2021, Brickman signed with Kaohsiung Aquas of the T1 League. He was the league's assists leader for the 2021–22 season. On July 2, 2022, Brickman was selected to the all-T1 League first team in 2021–22 season. On July 4, 2022, Brickman awarded the Most Valuable Import of the T1 League in 2021–22 season. On July 21, Brickman re-signed with the Kaohsiung Aquas. On May 11, 2023, Brickman was selected to the all-T1 League first team in 2022–23 season. On August 5, Brickman re-signed with the Kaohsiung Aquas. On February 17, 2024, Brickman sustained a Jones fracture to his left foot, and he was expected to miss three months of the season. On March 18, Brickman was not registered in the 2023–24 T1 League season final rosters. He was the league's assists leader for the 2023–24 season. On December 18, Jason Brickman decided to leave the Kaohsiung Aquas.

In March 2025, Brickman returned to Philippine basketball, this time with the Abra Solid North Weavers of the Maharlika Pilipinas Basketball League (MPBL).

On January 31, 2026, Brickman signed a 1-year rookie contract with the Meralco Bolts of the Philippine Basketball Association (PBA).

== PBA career statistics ==
Legend
| GP | Games played | MPG | Minutes per game | FG% | Field-goal percentage |
| 3FG% | 3-point field-goal percentage | 4P% | 4-point field-goal percentage | FT% | Free-throw percentage |
| RPG | Rebounds per game | APG | Assists per game | SPG | Steals per game |
| BPG | Blocks per game | PPG | Points per game | 127 | Career high |

As of the end of 2025–26 season

=== Season-by-season averages ===
| Year | Team | GP | MPG | FG% | 3P% | 4P% | FT% | RPG | APG | SPG | BPG | PPG |
|---|---|---|---|---|---|---|---|---|---|---|---|---|
| 2025–26 | Meralco | 28 | 28.2 | .379 | .322 | .000 | .905 | 3.0 | 5.2 | 1.1 | — | 8.4 |

== See also ==
- List of NCAA Division I men's basketball season assists leaders
- List of NCAA Division I men's basketball career assists leaders
