= 2016 ABL playoffs =

Tournament details
- Dates: February 27 – March 26
- Season: 2015–16
- Teams: 4

Final positions
- Champions: Westport Malaysia Dragons (2nd title)
- Runner-up: Singapore Slingers
- Semifinalists: Saigon Heat; Hi-Tech Bangkok City

The 2016 ABL playoffs is the postseason tournament concluding the 2015–16 ABL season of the ASEAN Basketball League (ABL). The top four teams that had the best regular season records qualified. The semifinals are a best-of-three series, while the finals is a best-of-five series. The higher-seed team holds the home court advantage, hosting games 1 and 3 in the semifinals, and games 1, 2 and 5 in the finals.

== Bracket ==
Semifinals
1	Malaysia	2
4	Saigon	0
2	Singapore	2
3	Bangkok City	1

Finals
1	Malaysia	3
2	Singapore	2

=== Semifinals ===
==== Malaysia vs. Saigon ====
27 February

Westports Malaysia Dragons	84–68	Saigon Heat

MABA Stadium, Kuala Lumpur

5 March

Saigon Heat	76–89	Westports Malaysia Dragons
Malaysia wins series 2–0

CIS Arena, Saigon

==== Singapore vs. Bangkok City ====
29 February
15:00

Singapore Slingers	70–73	Hi-Tech Bangkok City

OCBC Arena, Singapore

5 March

Hi-Tech Bangkok City	66–95	Singapore Slingers

Thai-Japanese Stadium, Bangkok

7 March

Singapore Slingers	68–60	Hi-Tech Bangkok City
Singapore wins series 2–1

OCBC Arena, Singapore

=== Finals ===
12 March

Westports Malaysia Dragons	80–84	Singapore Slingers
Singapore lead series 1–0

MABA Stadium, Kuala Lumpur

14 March

Westports Malaysia Dragons	83–67	Singapore Slingers
Series tied 1–1

MABA Stadium, Kuala Lumpur

19 March

Singapore Slingers	72–90	Westports Malaysia Dragons
Malaysia lead series 2–1

OCBC Arena, Singapore

21 March

Singapore Slingers	75–73	Westports Malaysia Dragons
Series tied 2–2

OCBC Arena, Singapore

26 March

Westports Malaysia Dragons	77–65	Singapore Slingers
Malaysia wins series 3–2

MABA Stadium, Kuala Lumpur
