= Xavier Alexander =

American professional basketball player

Personal information
- Born: October 19, 1988 (age 38) Forest Park, Oklahoma
- Listed height: 6 ft 6 in (1.98 m)
- Listed weight: 209 lb (95 kg)

Career information
- High school: Midwest City (Midwest City, Oklahoma)
- College: George Washington (2007–2009); Southern Nazarene (2009–2011)
- NBA draft: 2011: undrafted
- Playing career: 2011–2024
- Position: Shooting guard / small forward

Career history
- 2011–2012: Tulsa 66ers
- 2012–2013: Siarka Tarnobrzeg
- 2013–2015: Tulsa 66ers/Oklahoma City Blue
- 2015–2020: Singapore Slingers
- 2018–2019: Hi-Tech Bangkok City
- 2021–2022: Kaohsiung Aquas
- 2022: Halcones de Xalapa
- 2022–2023: Singapore Slingers
- 2023: Kaohsiung Aquas
- 2024: Tangerang Hawks

Career highlights
- T1 League champion (2022); TPBL champion (2019); TPBL MVP (2019); TBL champion (2018); ABL World Import MVP (2019); NAIA All-American (2011); First-team All-NAIA D1 (2010); First-team All-SAC (2011)

Xavier Allen Alexander (born October 19, 1988), nicknamed "X-Man", is an American former professional basketball player. He played college basketball for George Washington Revolutionaries and Southern Nazarene Crimson Storm.

== High school career ==
Alexander attended Midwest City High School in Midwest City, Oklahoma. As a senior, he averaged 23.0 points and 10.0 rebounds per game, helping the Bombers post a 27–1 record in 2006–07.

== College career ==
=== George Washington ===
In his freshman season at GWU, Alexander played 23 games, averaging 4.0 points, 3.8 rebounds, 1.3 assists and 1.1 steals per game. In his sophomore season, he played 13 games, averaging 3.5 points, 3.2 rebounds, 1.5 assists and 1.1 steals per game.

=== Southern Nazarene ===
In 2009, Alexander transferred to Southern Nazarene University. In his junior season, he was named to the All-NAIA D1 first team. In 31 games, he averaged 13.0 points, 6.7 rebounds, 3.6 assists, 1.1 blocks and 1.3 steals per game. In his senior season, he earned All-Sooner Athletic Conference first team and NAIA All-American honors. In 32 games, he averaged 17.7 points, 6.6 rebounds, 3.3 assists and 1.2 steals per game.

== Professional career ==
Alexander went undrafted in the 2011 NBA draft.

=== Tulsa 66ers ===
On November 3, 2011, he was selected in the eighth round of the 2011 NBA D-League draft by the Tulsa 66ers.

=== Siarka Tarnobrzeg ===
On August 9, 2012, he signed with Siarka Tarnobrzeg of Poland for the 2012–13 season.

=== Tulsa 66ers (second stint) ===
In November 2013, he was reacquired by the Tulsa 66ers.

=== Oklahoma City Blue ===
On November 4, 2014, he was acquired by the Oklahoma City Blue.

=== Singapore Slingers ===
On October 4, 2015, Alexander signed with the Singapore Slingers of the ASEAN Basketball League. Alexander signed with the Singapore Slingers for a fifth consecutive season since 2015.

=== Kaohsiung Aquas ===
On September 10, 2021, Alexander signed with the Kaohsiung Aquas of the T1 League.

=== Singapore Slingers (second stint) ===
On October 25, 2022, Alexander re-signed with the Singapore Slingers of the ASEAN Basketball League.

=== Kaohsiung Aquas (second stint) ===
On March 8, 2023, Kaohsiung Aquas registered Alexander as import player. On March 17, Alexander re-signed with the Kaohsiung Aquas of the T1 League.

== ABL career statistics ==
Legend
GP	Games played	GS	Games started	MPG	Minutes per game
FG%	Field goal percentage	3P%	3-point field goal percentage	FT%	Free throw percentage
RPG	Rebounds per game	APG	Assists per game	SPG	Steals per game
BPG	Blocks per game	PPG	Points per game	**Bold**	Career high

Year	Team	GP	GS	MPG	FG%	3P%	FT%	RPG	APG	SPG	BPG	PPG
2015–16	Singapore	28	28	36.5	.430	.170	.520	**10.0**	5.4	2.3	**.8**	18.1
2016–17	Singapore	25	25	39.2	**.490**	.260	.610	9.8	6.2	**2.7**	**.8**	19.3
2017–18	Singapore	23	23	**39.5**	.450	.290	.680	9.5	7.4	2.6	.7	**24.6**
2018–19	Singapore	**36**	**36**	39.2	.450	**.330**	**.720**	8.8	**7.9**	1.8	.5	21.3
Career		112	112	38.7	.450	.280	.640	9.5	6.8	2.2	.7	20.8
