= Kuen Shan Senior High School =

High school in Taiwan

Kuei Shan Senior High School is a high school in Taiwan.
