= Brendan Joyce =

Australian basketball coach

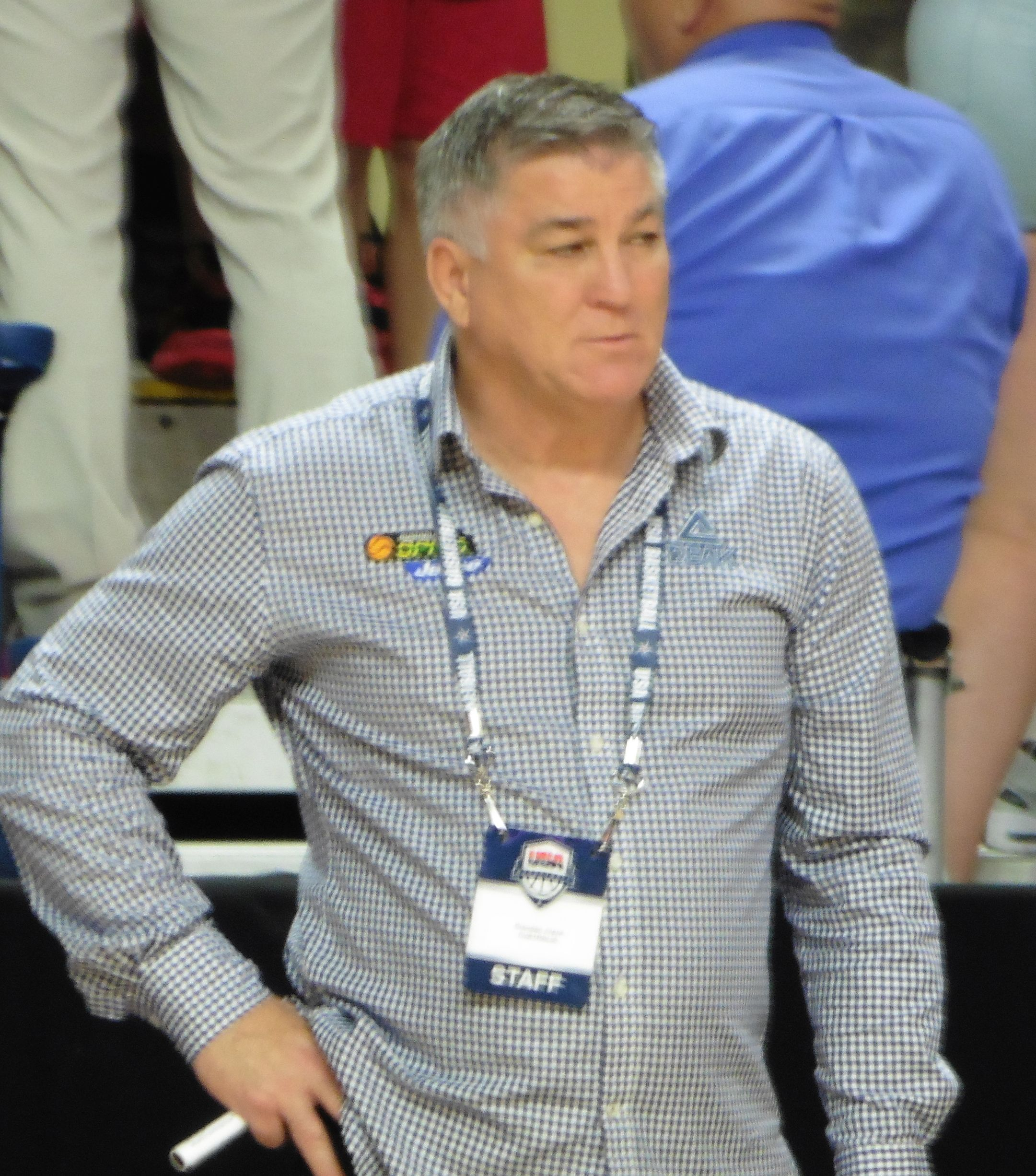
- Joyce in 2016

Personal information
- Born: 1 May 1960 (age 66) Melbourne, Victoria, Australia
- Listed height: 178 cm (5 ft 10 in)
- Listed weight: 79 kg (174 lb)

Career information
- Playing career: 1979–1991
- Position: Guard
- Coaching career: 1993–present

Career history

Playing
- 1979–1982: Nunawading Spectres
- 1983–1984: St. Kilda Saints
- 1985–1987: Nunawading / Eastside Spectres
- 1988–1990: Westside Saints
- 1991: Brisbane Bullets

Coaching
- 1993–1995: Ballarat Miners
- 1996–2006: Illawarra / Wollongong Hawks
- 2007–2009: Gold Coast Blaze
- 2019–2021: Ballarat Miners
- 2021–2024: Kaohsiung Aquas
- 2026: Ballarat Miners

Career highlights
- As coach: T1 League champion (2022); NBL champion (2001); 2× ABA National champion (1994, 1995); T1 League Coach of the Year (2022); 2× NBL Coach of the Year (1999, 2001); 2× SEABL Coach of the Year (1994, 1995); T1 League All-Star Game head coach (2023)

Brendan Joyce (born 1 May 1960) is an Australian professional basketball coach and former player. He most recent served as the head coach of the Ballarat Miners women's team of the NBL1 South. He played 13 seasons in the National Basketball League (NBL) between 1979 and 1991 before beginning his coaching career in 1993. After back-to-back ABA National championships with the Ballarat Miners men in 1994 and 1995, he joined the Illawarra Hawks as head coach in 1996. He was named NBL Coach of the Year in 1999 and 2001, and guided the Hawks to the NBL championship in 2001. In 2022, Joyce guided the Kaohsiung Aquas to the T1 League championship.

Joyce served as an assistant coach with the Australian Boomers between 2001 and 2009, and served as head coach of the Australian Opals between 2013 and 2016.

== Early life ==
Joyce was born in Melbourne, Victoria.

== Playing career ==
Joyce debuted in the National Basketball League in its inaugural season in 1979 with the Nunawading Spectres. He was a member of the Spectres' NBL Grand Final team in 1981. Following a fourth season with the Spectres in 1982, he played for the St. Kilda Saints in 1983 and 1984. He returned to the Spectres in 1985 and played another three seasons for the team. He then made a return to the Saints, now known as the Westside Saints, in 1988. After three seasons with Westside, he played one final NBL season in 1991 with the Brisbane Bullets.

Joyce led the NBL in assists in 1988 and played in the 1988 and 1989 NBL All-Star games.

=== National team ===
In 1981, Joyce served as captain of the Australian under 23 national team.

== Coaching career ==
Joyce became head coach of the Ballarat Miners of the South East Australian Basketball League (SEABL) in 1993. In 1994 and 1995, he guided the Miners to back-to-back ABA National championships and earned back-to-back SEABL Coach of the Year awards.

In 1996, Joyce became head coach of the Illawarra Hawks in the NBL. He was voted NBL Coach of the Year in 1999 and 2001. In 2001, he guided the Hawks to the NBL championship. In late December 2006, just days after Christmas, he was sacked by the Hawks following an on-going dispute with the club's CEO.

In January 2007, Joyce was named the inaugural coach of the Gold Coast Blaze, starting in the 2007–08 NBL season. In February 2008, he became the fifth person to coach 400 games in the NBL. He guided the Blaze to the playoffs in their first year. Following the 2008–09 NBL season where the Blaze finished on the bottom of the ladder, Joyce was sacked.

In November 2018, Joyce was appointed head coach of the Ballarat Miners men's team of the NBL1 for the next three years. He parted ways with the Miners in October 2021.

Joyce joined the Kaohsiung Aquas in 2021 for the first season of T1 League. The Aquas played well throughout the year, setting a number of individual and team records. The Aquas secured the number one seed prior to the playoffs, and won the T1 League's inaugural championship in a three-game sweep of the Taichung Wagor Suns. On June 24, 2022, Joyce received the Coach of the Year award for the 2021–22 T1 League season. He parted ways with the Aquas in May 2024.

In December 2025, Joyce was appointed head coach of the Ballarat Miners women's team for the 2026 NBL1 South season. After one season, he did not return for the 2027 season.

=== National team ===
Joyce joined Barry Barnes' Australian national team program as a guest assistant coach in the lead up to the 2000 Olympic Games with games against Russia and Canada. He served as an assistant coach with the Boomers between 2001 and 2009, including two Olympic Games at Athens 2004 and Beijing 2008.

In 2013, Joyce was named head coach of the Australian Opals. He coached them through to the 2016 Rio Olympics.

== Personal life ==
Joyce and his wife, Joanne, raised their four children in Wollongong. He coached his son, Daniel Joyce, in the NBL at both Wollongong and Gold Coast.

In November 2025, Joyce was inducted into the Victoria University (VU) Sport Hall of Fame.
