= Kaohsiung Arena =

Stadium in Zuoying, Kaohsiung, Taiwan

- 高雄巨蛋
- K-ARENA
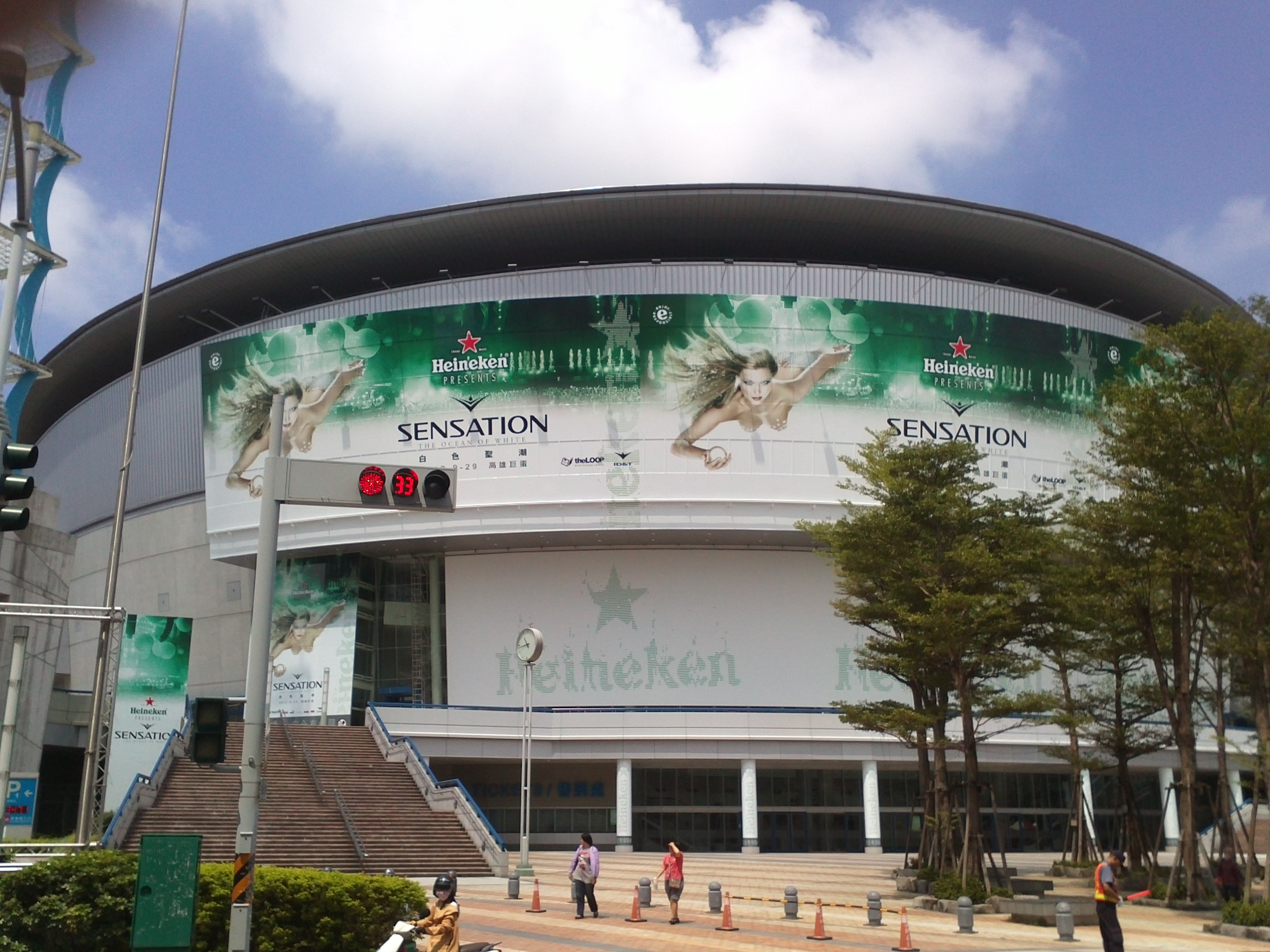
- Interactive map of Kaohsiung Arena
- Full name: 高雄市現代化綜合體育館
- Location: Zuoying, Kaohsiung, Taiwan
- Coordinates: 22°40′9″N 120°18′7″E
- Owner: Kaohsiung City Government
- Capacity: 15,000
- Public transit: Kaohsiung Metro: Kaohsiung Arena

Construction
- Opened: 27 September 2008

Tenant
- Kaohsiung Aquas (T1/TPBL) (2021–present)

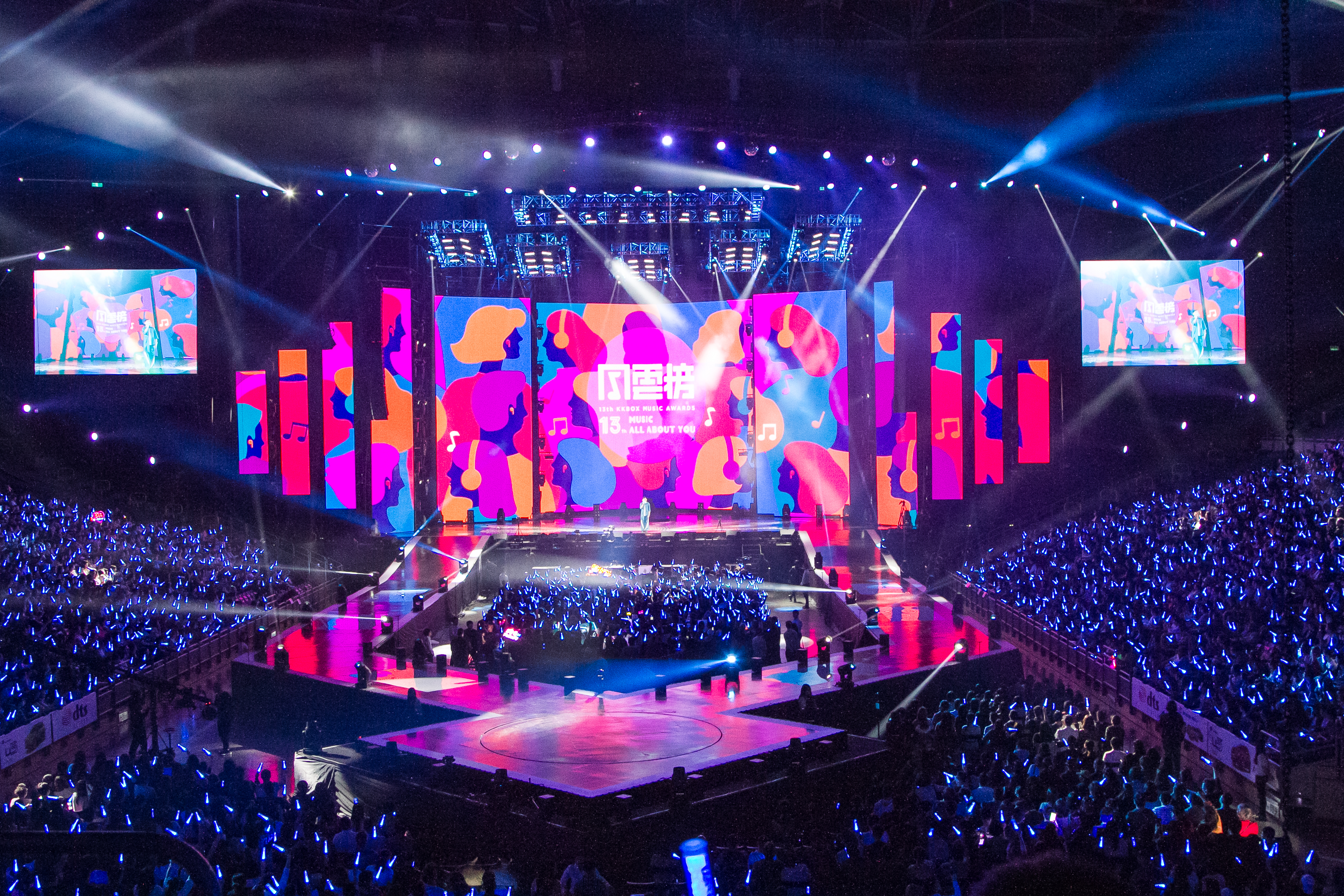
2018 KKBox Music Awards at the Kaohsiung Arena

The Kaohsiung Arena (Chinese: 高雄巨蛋; pinyin: Gāoxióng Jùdàn) is an indoor sporting arena located in Zuoying District, Kaohsiung, Taiwan. It is used to host indoor sporting events. It was used as a host to some of the indoor sporting events during the 2009 World Games.

== Name ==
Local people give the nickname of Kaohsiung Arena as the Big Egg due to its shape and resemblance of an egg.

== History ==
Kaohsiung Arena was opened on 27 September 2008.

== Architecture ==
Kaohsiung Arena covers an area of 57,037 m^{2} and has a capacity of 15,000 people. It stands to a height of 42 meters over 6 floors. It also features a 100,000 m^{2} open space adjacent to it.

== Transportation ==
The venue is accessible within walking distance north of Kaohsiung Arena Station of Kaohsiung MRT.

== Entertainment events ==
Entertainment events at Kaohsiung Arena
Date	Artist	Event	Ref
2023
26 February	Westlife	The Wild Dreams Tour	
31 March & 1-16 April	A-Mei	ASMR World Tour	
2024
19 January	OneRepublic	The Artificial Paradise Tour	
17 November	Lisa	Lisa Fan Meetup in Asia	
5 December	Charlie Puth	Charlie Puth Presents “Something New”	
2025
25-26 January	Super Junior-D&E	Super Junior-D&E World Tour: ECLIPSE	
15 March	Kylie Minogue	Tension Tour	
28-30 March	Jacky Cheung	Jacky Cheung 60+ Concert Tour	
16-18, 23-25 May	Eason Chan	Fear and Dreams World Tour	
16-26 July	Jody Chiang	2025 Jiang Hui Concert	
29 November	Wakin Chau	The Boy's Fantasy Journey 3.0	
19 December	OneRepublic	OneRepublic Concert in Kaohsiung	
21 December	Doja Cat	Tour Ma Vie World Tour	
2026
23-25 January	Super Junior	Super Show 10	
25-26 April	S.Coups X Mingyu	Double Up Live Party Tour	
27-28 June	Itzy	Tunnel Vision World Tour	
18 July	Exo	Exo Planet 6 – Exhorizon	

== See also ==
- List of stadiums in Taiwan
