= Kaohsiung Aquas =

Professional basketball team in Taiwan

- 2026–27 Kaohsiung Aquas season
- Leagues: Taiwan Professional Basketball League
- Founded: May 26, 2021
- History: Kaohsiung Aquas; 2021–2024 (T1); 2024–present (TPBL)
- Arena: Kaohsiung Arena
- Capacity: 15,000
- Location: Kaohsiung City, Taiwan
- Team colors: Deep indigo, blue, green
- Main sponsor: FamilyMart
- CEO: Li Wei-Cheng
- President: Hou Chia-Chi
- Head coach: Zico Coronel
- Ownership: Kuo Yang Construction
- Championships: 1 T1: 1 (2022)
- Website: ktown-aquas.com

The Kaohsiung Aquas (Chinese: 高雄全家海神) are a Taiwanese professional basketball team based in Kaohsiung City. They have competed in the Taiwan Professional Basketball League (TPBL) and play their home games at the Kaohsiung Arena. The Aquas became one of the six teams of the inaugural T1 League season, and one of the seven teams of the inaugural TPBL season.

== Franchise history ==
On May 26, 2021, the Kaohsiung Aquas announced to join the T1 League. On August 4, the Kaohsiung Aquas traded their 1st round pick to New Taipei CTBC DEA for 1.5 million NTD. In the 2021 draft, they drafted I-Shou swingman Su Wen-Ju in the second round.

The Kaohsiung Aquas have a copartnership with Kaohsiung Jeoutai Technology, signed multi-players originally play in the team. Jeoutai Tech is a semi-professional basketball team competes in the Super Basketball League (SBL), another league in Taiwan.

On April 17, 2022, the Kaohsiung Aquas announced that they would play their playoff home games at Fengshan Arena. On June 4, the Kaohsiung Aquas defeated the Taichung Wagor Suns, 3–0, winning the 2021–22 season championship.

On July 9, 2024, the Kaohsiung Aquas announced to join the Taiwan Professional Basketball League (TPBL).

== Facilities ==
=== Home arenas ===
Arena	Location	Duration
Fengshan Arena	Kaohsiung City	2022; 2024
Kaohsiung Arena	Kaohsiung City	2021–present

== Current roster ==
Kaohsiung Aquas roster
Players
Coaches

Pos.	No.	Nat.	Name	Ht.	Wt.	Age	From
G/F	3	(United States) (Taiwan)	Adam Hinton	1.94 m (6 ft 4 in)	100 kg (220 lb)	23 – 9 July 2003	Cornell
G	7	(Taiwan)	Yu Huan-Ya	1.82 m (6 ft 0 in)	81 kg (179 lb)	32 – 30 November 1993	NTNU
G/F	8	(Taiwan)	Chiu Tzu-Hsuan	1.90 m (6 ft 3 in)	89 kg (196 lb)	26 – 8 December 1999	ISU
SF	9	(Taiwan)	Tang Wei-Chieh (injured)	1.92 m (6 ft 4 in)	89 kg (196 lb)	27 – 25 September 1999	VMI
PF	10	(Taiwan)	Hu Long-Mao (injured)	1.96 m (6 ft 5 in)	101 kg (223 lb)	33 – 22 December 1992	Chaminade
G/F	11	(Taiwan)	Shih Chin-Yao	1.88 m (6 ft 2 in)	86 kg (190 lb)	36 – 28 October 1990	CCU
G	12	(United States)	Hunter Maldonado (I)	1.98 m (6 ft 6 in)	90 kg (198 lb)	27 – 24 March 1999	Wyoming
PF/C	21	(Taiwan)	Lu Wei-Ting	2.01 m (6 ft 7 in)	103 kg (227 lb)	29 – 16 April 1997	ISU
G/F	24	(Taiwan)	Su Wen-Ju	1.87 m (6 ft 2 in)	78 kg (172 lb)	29 – 16 October 1997	ISU
PF/C	25	(Hungary) (United States)	Rosco Allen (I)	2.08 m (6 ft 10 in)	100 kg (220 lb)	33 – 5 May 1993	Stanford
G/F	28	(Taiwan)	Yu Chun-An (C)	1.89 m (6 ft 2 in)	83 kg (183 lb)	34 – 13 February 1992	NTNU
SF	30	(Taiwan)	Mayaw Fotol	1.90 m (6 ft 3 in)	95 kg (209 lb)	23 – 7 July 2003	NTSU
PF	52	(Brazil)	Gabriel Galvanini (I)	2.04 m (6 ft 8 in)	100 kg (220 lb)	28 – 11 September 1998	Brazil
SF	57	(Taiwan)	Wu Siao-Jin	1.90 m (6 ft 3 in)	81 kg (179 lb)	31 – 28 August 1995	NKNU
G	66	(Taiwan)	Chen Huai-An	1.86 m (6 ft 1 in)	86 kg (190 lb)	29 – 29 April 1997	NTUA
PF/C	00	(United States) (Italy)	Grant Basile (injured) (I)	2.06 m (6 ft 9 in)	105 kg (231 lb)	26 – 19 April 2000	Virginia Tech

Head coach

- (New Zealand) Zico Coronel

Assistant coach(es)

- (United States) (Italy) Nick Schlitzer
- (Taiwan) Liao Che-Yi
- (Taiwan) Lee Cheng-Yen
- (Taiwan) Yen Hua-Wei
- (Taiwan) Zhu Yong-Hong

Athletic trainer(s)

- (Taiwan) Huang Yu-Jiun
- (Taiwan) Liao Hsuan-Yi
- (Taiwan) Wu You-Ting

Legend

- (C) Team captain
- (I) Import player
- Injured

- Roster
- Transactions
Updated: November 21, 2026

== Season-by-season record ==
Season	League	Coach	Regular season				Postseason	Asian competition					
Season	League	Coach	Won	Lost	Win %	Finish	Postseason	League	Won	Lost	Win %	Finish	Result
2021–22	T1	Brendan Joyce	23	7	.767	1st	Won semifinals (HeroBears) 2–0; Won finals (Suns) 3–0	Did not participate					
2022–23	T1	Brendan Joyce	16	14	.533	3rd	Lost semifinals (GhostHawks) 2–3	Did not participate					
2023–24	T1	Brendan Joyce	15	13	.536	3rd	Lost semifinals (Leopards) 0–3	Did not participate					
2024–25	TPBL	Mathias Fischer	19	17	.528	3rd	Won semifinals (Dreamers) 4–1; Lost finals (Kings) 3–4	Did not participate					
2025–26	TPBL	Mathias Fischer	9	27	.250	7th	Did not qualify	Did not participate					
2025–26	TPBL	Zhu Yong-Hong	9	27	.250	7th	Did not qualify	Did not participate					
2026–27	TPBL	Zico Coronel	4	2	.667			Did not participate					
Totals			86	80	.518	–	4 Playoff appearances	–	0	0	–	–	0 Playoff appearances

== Notable players ==
Local players

- (United States) (Taiwan) Adam Hinton (賀丹) – Chinese Taipei national team player
- (Taiwan) Hu Long-Mao (胡瓏貿) – Chinese Taipei national team player, T1 League Finals MVP (2022)
- (Taiwan) Li Han-Sheng (李漢昇) – Chinese Taipei national team player
- (Taiwan) Lin Jen-Hung (林任鴻) – Chinese Taipei national team player
- (Taiwan) Tang Wei-Chieh (唐維傑) – Chinese Taipei national team player
- (Taiwan) Wu I-Ping (吳怡斌) – Chinese Taipei national team player
- (Taiwan) Wu Siao-Jin (吳曉謹) – Chinese Taipei national team player
- (Taiwan) Yu Huan-Ya (于煥亞) – Chinese Taipei national team player

Type-III players

- (Philippines) (United States) Jason Brickman – ABL Finals MVP (2016), TBL MVP (2018)

Import players

- (United States) Xavier Alexander – TBL MVP (2019)
- (United States) Rosco Allen – Hungary national team player
- (United States) Grant Basile – Italy national team player
- Terrence Bieshaar – Netherlands national team player
- (United States) Bogdan Bliznyuk – Ukraine national team player
- (United States) John Bohannon – Jordan national team player
- Gabriel Galvanini – Brazil national team player
- (United Kingdom) Aaron Geramipoor – Iran national team player
- (United States) Justin James – NBA player
- (United States) Perry Jones – NBA player
- (United States) Arnett Moultrie – NBA player
- (United States) Chris Ortiz – Puerto Rico national team player
- Craig Sword – NBA player, United States national team player
- Rade Zagorac – Serbia national team player
- Edgaras Želionis – Lithuania national team player
