= T1 League =

Taiwanese professional basketball league

- Sport: Basketball
- Founded: May 24, 2021
- Founder: Kuan Kuang-Chung
- First season: 2021–22
- Folded: July 9, 2024
- Country: Taiwan
- Last champions: Taiwan Beer Leopards (1st title)
- Most titles: Kaohsiung Aquas; New Taipei CTBC DEA; Taiwan Beer Leopards (1 each)

The T1 League (Chinese: T1聯盟) was a professional basketball league in Taiwan. It was the third Taiwanese professional basketball league after the now-defunct Chinese Basketball Alliance (CBA; 1994–1999) and P. League+ (PLG; founded in 2020).

== History ==
=== 2021 ===
1st Season Logo

On May 10, 2021, Kuan Kuang-Chung, the former National Basketball Association (NBA) Taiwan region general manager, was named as the sponsor of the new professional basketball league. There were four corporations willing to join the league. On May 24, the name of the new league was announced as T1 League. Teams from Kaohsiung City, New Taipei City, Taichung City, and Taipei City applied to join the league. On May 26, the Kaohsiung Aquas announced to join the T1 League. On June 19, the Taichung Suns was established formally. On July 30, the New Taipei CTBC DEA was established formally to be the new team of the T1 League. On August 6, the T1 League announced that Chien Wei-Chuan was the commissioner of the league. Besides, the Taoyuan Leopards and the Tainan team would join the league. On August 9, the T1 League held the first draft. There were 58 players participated in the draft, and 17 players were chosen in 5 rounds. On September 2, the Taiwan Beer basketball team announced to join the league as the TaiwanBeer HeroBears. On September 6, the T1 League announced that Chang Yun-Chih was the secretary general of the league. On September 30, the name of Tainan team was announced as the Tainan TSG GhostHawks. On November 25, the Taichung Suns changed the name to the Taichung Wagor Suns. On November 27, the 2021–22 season opening game, matched by the Kaohsiung Aquas and the TaiwanBeer HeroBears, was played at University of Taipei Tianmu Campus Gymnasium.

=== 2022 ===
On June 4, 2022, the Kaohsiung Aquas defeated the Taichung Wagor Suns, 3–0, winning the 2021–22 season championship. On July 12, the T1 League held the second draft. There were 44 players participated in the draft, and 14 players were chosen in 3 rounds. On September 5, the T1 League announced that Liu Yi-Cheng served as the vice commissioner of the league. Hsieh Chih-Cheng was the new chief operating officer, and Chang Shu-Jen, the general manager of the New Taipei CTBC DEA, was the new secretary general of the league. The former secretary general and chief operating officer, Chang Yun-Chih and Chia Fan, would transfer to senior consultant and tournament consultant, respectively. On September 29, the T1 League announced that Tsai Shang-Hua served as the strategic marketing director of the league. On October 29, the 2022–23 season opening game, matched by the Kaohsiung Aquas and the New Taipei CTBC DEA, was played at Xinzhuang Gymnasium.

=== 2023 ===
On February 28, 2023, the T1 League held the first All-Star Game at Taipei Heping Basketball Gymnasium. On May 21, the New Taipei CTBC DEA defeated the Tainan TSG GhostHawks, 4–0, winning the 2022–23 season championship. On June 26, the T1 League announced that the Taishin Sports Entertainment Co., Ltd. took over the participation rights of the TaiwanBeer HeroBears. On July 4, the Taoyuan Leopards announced to cooperate with the Taiwan Beer basketball association, and the Taoyuan Leopards changed the name to the TaiwanBeer Leopards. On July 14, the T1 League held the third draft. There were 41 players participated in the draft, and 7 players were chosen in 2 rounds. On August 18, the T1 League announced that Chang Shu-Jen, the secretary general of the league, left the league. On August 21, the T1 League announced that Wang Chih-Chun was the new secretary general of the league. On August 24, the name of Taipei Taishin basketball team was announced as the Taipei Taishin Mars. On September 15, the T1 League announced that the 2023–24 season participation rights of the Taichung Suns was cancelled due to financial qualification. On October 12, Tsai Shang-Hua, the strategic marketing director of the league, announced to leave the league. On October 16, the Taichung Suns announced to fold officially. On October 28, the 2023–24 season opening game, matched by the Tainan TSG GhostHawks and the New Taipei CTBC DEA, was played at Xinzhuang Gymnasium.

=== 2024 ===
On June 1, 2024, the Taiwan Beer Leopards defeated the Taipei Mars, 4–0, winning the 2023–24 season championship. On June 26, T1 League announced that the five teams of the T1 League would organize the new league for 2024–25 season. On July 9, the Tainan TSG GhostHawks announced to quit the new league preparation for the new season of the P. League+. And the Kaohsiung Aquas, New Taipei CTBC DEA, Taipei Taishin Mars, and the Taoyuan Taiwan Beer Leopards announced to join the Taiwan Professional Basketball League (TPBL).

== Teams ==
Overview of T1 League teams
Franchise	Names	Years	Fate
Kaohsiung Aquas	Kaohsiung Aquas	2021–2024	Joined the TPBL, 2024, as Kaohsiung Aquas
New Taipei CTBC DEA	New Taipei CTBC DEA	2021–2024	Joined the TPBL, 2024, as New Taipei CTBC DEA
Taichung Wagor Suns Taichung Suns	Taichung Wagor Suns	2021–2022	Folded, 2023 (cancelled participation rights)
Taichung Wagor Suns Taichung Suns	Taichung Suns	2022–2023	Folded, 2023 (cancelled participation rights)
Tainan TSG GhostHawks	Tainan TSG GhostHawks	2021–2024	Joined the PLG, 2024, with name changes to TSG GhostHawks
Taipei Mars	Taipei Mars	2023–2024	Joined the TPBL, 2024, with name changes to Taipei Taishin Mars
TaiwanBeer HeroBears	TaiwanBeer HeroBears	2021–2023	Folded, 2023 (transferred participation rights)
Taoyuan Leopards Taiwan Beer Leopards	Taoyuan Leopards	2021–2023	Joined the TPBL, 2024, with name changes to Taoyuan Taiwan Beer Leopards
Taoyuan Leopards Taiwan Beer Leopards	Taiwan Beer Leopards	2023–2024	Joined the TPBL, 2024, with name changes to Taoyuan Taiwan Beer Leopards

== Rules and regulations ==
=== Games ===
Each quarter plays 12 minutes. Each game totally plays 48 minutes.

=== Players ===
- Each team can select 8 to 13 players to active roster in each match.
- Each team is able to register 9 to 14 local players and 3 or 4 general import players.
- Each team is able to select 2 or 3 import players into active roster in each match.
- 8-Imports-In-4-Quarters Rule: each quarter can have 2 import players on the court.

== Regular season ==
Each team plays against another six times, three at home and three on the road, respectively. Each team plays 30 matches total in the regular season. Each team played against another seven times, and 28 matches total in the 2023–24 regular season.

=== Ranking ===
Seasons	1st place	2nd place	3rd place	4th place	5th place	6th place	MVP	Ref.
2021–22	Kaohsiung Aquas; 23–7	Taichung Wagor Suns; 20–10	New Taipei CTBC DEA; 17–13	TaiwanBeer HeroBears; 16–14	Taoyuan Leopards; 8–22	Tainan TSG GhostHawks; 6–24	Chiang Yu-An (HeroBears)	
2022–23	New Taipei CTBC DEA; 25–5	Tainan TSG GhostHawks; 19–11	Kaohsiung Aquas; 16–14	TaiwanBeer HeroBears; 16–14	Taichung Suns; 8–22	Taoyuan Leopards; 6–24	Mohammad Al Bachir Gadiaga (DEA)	
2023–24	New Taipei CTBC DEA; 19–9	Taiwan Beer Leopards; 18–10	Kaohsiung Aquas; 15–13	Taipei Mars; 11–17	Tainan TSG GhostHawks; 7–21	—N/a	Mohammad Al Bachir Gadiaga (DEA)	

== Playoffs ==
=== Play-in ===
The fourth and fifth seeds play the best-of-three play-in series. The fourth seed is awarded a one-win advantage. The winner can qualify the semifinals series. The 2024 play-in series was cancelled.

Years	Qualifiers	Result	Eliminated	Ref.
2022	TaiwanBeer HeroBears	2–0	Taoyuan Leopards	
2023	Taichung Suns	2–1	TaiwanBeer HeroBears	
2024	—N/a			

=== Semifinals ===
The winner of play-in series and the top three seeds play the best-of-five semifinals series. Due to the COVID-19 pandemic in Taiwan, the 2022 semifinals series changed to best-of-three series.

Years	Qualifiers	Result	Eliminated	Ref.
2022	Kaohsiung Aquas	2–0	TaiwanBeer HeroBears	
2022	Taichung Wagor Suns	2–1	New Taipei CTBC DEA	
2023	New Taipei CTBC DEA	3–0	Taichung Suns	
2023	Tainan TSG GhostHawks	3–2	Kaohsiung Aquas	
2024	Taipei Mars	3–2	New Taipei CTBC DEA	
2024	Taiwan Beer Leopards	3–0	Kaohsiung Aquas	

=== Finals ===
The winners of the semifinals series play the best-of-seven finals series. Due to the COVID-19 pandemic in Taiwan, the 2022 finals series changed to best-of-five series.

Years	Champions	Result	Runners-up	FMVP	Ref.
2022	Kaohsiung Aquas (1)	3–0	Taichung Wagor Suns	Hu Long-Mao (Aquas)	
2023	New Taipei CTBC DEA (1)	4–0	Tainan TSG GhostHawks	Lin Wei-Han (DEA)	
2024	Taiwan Beer Leopards (1)	4–0	Taipei Mars	DeMarcus Cousins (Leopards)	

== All-Star Game ==
Year	Win	Result	Loss	AMVP	Three-Point Contest Champion	Slam Dunk Contest Champion	Ref.
2023	Team Infinity	179–124	Team Beyond	Dwight Howard (Team Infinity)	Lu Kuan-Hsuan (Suns)	Liu Chun-Ting (GhostHawks)	

== Broadcast partners ==
Seasons	Television	Online	Ref.
2021–22	Eleven Sports, ELTA TV	17LIVE, Twitch (2022), Facebook (since January 28, 2022), Line Today (since Play-in)	
2022–23	Eleven Sports, VL Sports, ELTA TV	YouTube, Camerabay (since December 16, 2022)	
2023–24	VL Sports, ELTA TV	YouTube, Twitch	

== Mottos ==
Seasons	Mottos	Ref.
2021–22	More Than One	
2022–23	Welcome To T1 Universe	
2023–24	Guess What!	

== See also ==
- Chinese Basketball Alliance (CBA)
- Chinese Taipei men's national basketball team
- List of basketball leagues
- P. League+ (PLG)
- Sport in Taiwan
- Super Basketball League (SBL)
- Taiwan Professional Basketball League (TPBL)
- Women's Super Basketball League (WSBL)
