= 2024 PLG draft =

General information
- Sport: Basketball
- Date: July 12, 2024
- Location: Taipei New Horizon (Taipei)
- Network: Youtube

Overview
- 11 total selections in 5 rounds
- League: P. League+
- First selection: Mouhamed Mbaye (Taipei Fubon Braves)

The 2024 PLG draft, the fourth edition of the P. League+'s annual draft, was originally scheduled to be held on July 10, 2024.

Due to the ongoing PLG–T1 League merger, both PLG and T1 League drafts were declared to be suspended on July 1 and replaced by a united draft.

On July 8, Kaohsiung 17LIVE Steelers, Taipei Fubon Braves and Taoyuan Pauian Pilots announced to exit the PLG–T1 League merger, preferring to stay in the PLG for the upcoming season. On July 9, Tainan TSG GhostHawks announced to exit the PLG–T1 League merger and join PLG. The draft was resumed and rescheduled to July 12 at Taipei New Horizon with 4 teams participating.

== Draft selections ==
G	Guard	F	Forward	C	Center

^{#}	Denotes player who has never appeared in a PLG regular season or playoff game

Rnd.	Pick	Player	Pos.	Status	Team	School / club team
1	1	Mouhamed Mbaye	F	Foreign student	Taipei Fubon Braves(from Steelers) (Note: July 12, 2024: Kaohsiung 17LIVE Steelers to Taipei Fubon Braves: Braves acquired 2024 first-round pick; Steelers acquired Chen Fan Po-Yen, 2024 first-round pick, 2024 second-round pick)	NCCU
1	2	Lee Yun-Chieh	G	Local	Tainan TSG GhostHawks	NCCU
1	3	Marcus Quirk	F	Foreign student	Kaohsiung 17LIVE Steelers(from Braves) (Note: July 12, 2024: Taipei Fubon Braves to Kaohsiung 17LIVE Steelers: Steelers acquired Chen Fan Po-Yen, 2024 first-round pick, 2024 second-round pick; Braves acquired 2024 first-round pick)	NFU
1	4	Chen Li-Sheng	G	Local	Taoyuan Pauian Pilots	NTSU
1	5	Chang Chih-Hao	G	Local	Tainan TSG GhostHawks	NTUS
2	6	Chuang Chao-Sheng	G	Local	Kaohsiung 17LIVE Steelers(from Braves)	NCCU
2	7	Wang Kai-Yu	G	Local	Kaohsiung 17LIVE Steelers	NCCU
3	8	Wang Jhe-Yu^{#}	F	Local	Kaohsiung 17LIVE Steelers	NTUST
3	9	Chiang Chun^{#}	F	Local	Taipei Fubon Braves	FJU
4	10	Lin Hsin-Hsiang	G	Local	Kaohsiung 17LIVE Steelers	NTNU
5	11	Chu Yuk-Kiun	G	Local	Kaohsiung 17LIVE Steelers	NKNU

== Combine ==
The 2024 draft combine for both P. League+ and T1 League was held on July 3 at National Taiwan University of Arts Gymnasium.

== Entrants ==
=== Local ===
- Chang Chih-Hao – G, NTUS
- Chen Chiang-Shuang – G, SHU
- Chen Kuan-Chung – G, NTSU
- Chen Li-Sheng – G, NTSU
- Chiang Chun – F, FJU
- Chou Chun-Hao – G, DSSH
- Chou Shih-Chia – G, NTPU
- Chou Ssu-Yu – G, NTUS
- Chu Yuk-Kiun – G, NKNU
- Chuang Chao-Sheng – G, NCCU
- Chuang Po-Yuan – G, FJU
- Hsu Han-Cheng – F, HDUT
- Hsu Yu-Hui – G, NTSU
- Hung Wei-Tse – G, TUT
- Kao Wei-Lun – G, VNU
- Lee Ting-Mou – F, NFU
- Lee Yun-Chieh – G, NCCU
- Liao Chi-Hung – F, NTPU
- Lin Chan-Yu – G, HWU
- Lin Chia-Lung – F, NTUST
- Lin Hsin-Hsiang – G, NTNU
- Lin Yu-Che – F, NTCUST
- Samuel Manu – G, UC Davis
- Pan Nien-Lung – G, OCU
- Peng Po-Hua – G, NTNU
- Pu Kuo-Lun – C, ISU
- Shih Cheng-Ping – F, ISU
- Tailis Pavavaljung – G, CTBC
- Tsai Chen-Kang – F, UCH
- Tseng Ming-Wei – C, ISU
- Wang Chia-Chang – F, NTNU
- Wang Jhe-Yu – F, NTUST
- Wang Kai-Yu – G, NCCU
- Wang Shu-Fu – G, CTBC
- Wei Liang-Che – G, NKNU
- Wu Shao-Chi – G, PCCU
- Yen Tsung-Wei – C, NTUST
- Yu Wei-Hao – G, NTUA
- Zheng Hao-Che – G, NTUST
- Zheng Kai-Chi – G, CCUT

=== Foreign students ===
All teams are eligible to select at most one foreign student in the draft.

- (Nigeria) John Ameh Peters– C, PCCU
- (Ivory Coast) / (France) Ousmane Doumbia – C, HDUT
- (Senegal) Almamy Drame – F, NCCU
- (United States) Hartwick Gallentine – C, UCH
- (Ivory Coast) Abou-Kader Issouf – F, FJU
- (Serbia) Luka Ivosevic – F, VNU
- (Senegal) Mouhamed Mbaye – F, NCCU
- (United Kingdom) / (Brunei) Marcus Quirk – F, NFU

== See also ==
- 2024 TPBL draft
