= 2024 TPBL draft =

1st edition of the TPBL draft

General information
- Sport: Basketball
- Date: July 23, 2024
- Location: Grand Hilai Taipei (Taipei City)
- Network: TPBL on Youtube

Overview
- 11 total selections in 3 rounds
- League: Taiwan Professional Basketball League
- First selection: Samuel Manu (Taipei Taishin Mars)

The 2024 TPBL draft was the first edition of the Taiwan Professional Basketball League's annual draft. The draft was originally scheduled to be held on July 15, 2024, replacing the 2024 PLG draft and 2024 T1 League draft which were scheduled respectively on July 10 and July 11. On July 8, the Taipei Fubon Braves, Taoyuan Pauian Pilots, and the Kaohsiung 17LIVE Steelers announced to quit the new league preparation for the new season of the P. League+. On July 9, Tainan TSG GhostHawks announced to exit the merger and join the P. League+.

On July 11, the draft was rescheduled to July 23 at Grand Hilai Taipei in Taipei City. There were seven teams joined the draft, including the Formosa Dreamers, Hsinchu Toplus Lioneers, Kaohsiung Aquas, New Taipei CTBC DEA, New Taipei Kings, Taipei Taishin Mars, and the Taoyuan Taiwan Beer Leopards. There were 33 players participated in the draft, and 11 players were chosen in 3 rounds.

== Draft order ==
The draft order was based on the original draft orders of the 2024 PLG draft and 2024 T1 League draft. Teams with the same draft order for each round from their original drafts drew lots on July 11 to determine their priorities.

Previous leagues	Draft order			
Previous leagues	1st	2nd	3rd	4th
P. League+	Lioneers	Dreamers	Kings	—N/a
T1 League	Mars	Aquas	Leopards	DEA

The draft order after drawing lots:

TPBL	Draft order						
TPBL	1st	2nd	3rd	4th	5th	6th	7th
1st round	Mars	Lioneers	Dreamers	Aquas	DEA	Leopards	Kings
2nd round	Lioneers	Mars	Aquas	Dreamers	Leopards	Kings	DEA
3rd round	Mars	Lioneers	Dreamers	Aquas	Kings	DEA	Leopards
↓	Mars	Lioneers	Dreamers	Aquas	Kings	DEA	Leopards

== Draft results ==
G	Guard	F	Forward	C	Center

^{#}	Denotes player who has never appeared in one TPBL regular season or playoff game
^{~}	Denotes player who has been selected as Rookie of the Year

Rnd.	Pick	Player	Pos.	Team	School / club team
1	1	Samuel Manu^{~}	G	Taipei Taishin Mars	UC Davis (So.)
1	2	Tsai Cheng-Kang	F	Hsinchu Toplus Lioneers	UCH (Jr.)
1	3	Wang Jhe-Yu	F	Taoyuan Taiwan Beer Leopards (from Dreamers) (Note: July 20, 2024: Formosa Dreamers to Taoyuan Taiwan Beer Leopards: Leopards acquired Yang Shen-Yen and 2024 first-round pick; Dreamers acquired cash considerations)	NTUST (Sr.)
1	4	Wei Liang-Che	G	Kaohsiung Aquas	NKNU (Sr.)
1	5	Yu Wei-Hao	G	New Taipei CTBC DEA	NTUA (Sr.)
1	6	Chiang Chun	F	Taipei Taishin Mars (from Leopards) (Note: July 12, 2023: TaiwanBeer Leopards to Taipei Taishin basketball team: Taishin acquired Huang Tsung-Han and 2024 first-round pick; Leopards acquired 2023 first-round 2nd pick)	FJU (Sr.)
1	7	Chen Chiang-Shuang^{#}	G	New Taipei Kings	SHU (So.)
2	Taichung Suns (from Taishin, team folded in 2023) (Note: July 12, 2023: Taipei Taishin basketball team to Taichung Suns: Suns acquired 2023 second-round 3rd pick and 2024 second-round pick; Taishin acquired 2023 first-round pick; October 16, 2023: Taichung Suns folded.)				
2	8	Shih Cheng-Ping	F	Formosa Dreamers	ISU (M.A.)
2	9	Chuang Po-Yuan	G	Taoyuan Taiwan Beer Leopards	FJU (Sr.)
2	10	Chen Kuan-Chung^{#}	G	New Taipei CTBC DEA	NTSU (Sr.)
3	11	Tseng Ming-Wei^{#}	C	New Taipei CTBC DEA	ISU (Jr.)

- Reference：

== Undrafted players ==
These players were not selected in the 2024 TPBL draft, but have played at least one game in the TPBL.

Player	Pos.	Join team	School / club team
Hsu Yu-Hui	G	New Taipei CTBC DEA	NTSU (Sr.)

== Draft combine ==
The draft combine was held on July 3 at National Taiwan University of Arts Gymnasium. The draft combine of P. League+ and T1 League were originally scheduled to hold on July 3 and 6 at National Taiwan University of Arts Gymnasium.

Local player

- (Taiwan) Chang Chih-Hao – G, NTUS
- (Taiwan) Chen Chiang-Shuang – G, SHU
- (Taiwan) Chen Kuan-Chung – G, NTSU
- (Taiwan) Chen Li-Sheng – G, NTSU
- (Taiwan) Chiang Chun – F, FJU
- (Taiwan) Chou Chun-Hao – G, DSSH
- (Taiwan) Chou Shih-Chia – G, NTPU
- (Taiwan) Chou Ssu-Yu – G, NTUS
- (Taiwan) Chu Yuk-Kiun – G, NKNU
- (Taiwan) Chuang Chao-Sheng – G, NCCU
- (Taiwan) Chuang Po-Yuan – G, FJU
- (Taiwan) Hsu Han-Cheng – F, HDUT
- (Taiwan) Hsu Yu-Hui – F, NTSU
- (Taiwan) Hung Wei-Tse – G, TUT
- (Taiwan) Kao Wei-Lun – G, VNU
- (Taiwan) Lee Ting-Mou – F, NFU
- (Taiwan) Lee Yun-Chieh – G, NCCU
- (Taiwan) Liao Chi-Hung – F, NTPU
- (Taiwan) Lin Chan-Yu – G, HWU
- (Taiwan) Lin Chia-Lung – F, NTUST
- (Taiwan) Lin Hsin-Hsiang – G, NTNU
- (Taiwan) Lin Yu-Che – F, NTCUST
- (Taiwan) (United States) Samuel Manu – G, UC Davis
- (Taiwan) Pan Nien-Lung – G, OCU
- (Taiwan) Peng Bo-Hua – G, NTNU
- (Taiwan) Pu Kuo-Lun – F, ISU
- (Taiwan) Shih Cheng-Ping – F, ISU
- (Taiwan) Tailis Pavavaljung – G, CTBC
- (Taiwan) Tsai Chen-Kang – F, UCH
- (Taiwan) Tseng Ming-Wei – C, ISU
- (Taiwan) Wang Chia-Chang – F, NTNU
- (Taiwan) Wang Jhe-Yu – F, NTUST
- (Taiwan) Wang Kai-Yu – G, NCCU
- (Taiwan) Wang Shu-Fu – G, CTBC
- (Taiwan) (Vietnam) Wei Liang-Che – G, NKNU
- (Taiwan) Wu Shao-Chi – G, CCU
- (Taiwan) Yen Tsung-Wei – C, NTUST
- (Taiwan) Yu Wei-Hao – G, NTUA
- (Taiwan) Zheng Hao-Zhe – G, NTUST
- (Taiwan) Zheng Kai-Chi – G, CTBC

Foreign student

- (Ivory Coast) (France) Ousmane Doumbia – C, HDUT
- (Senegal) Almamy Drame – F, NCCU
- (United States) Hartwick Gallentine – C, UCH
- (Ivory Coast) Abou-Kader Issouf – F, FJU
- (Serbia) Luka Ivosevic – F, VNU
- (Senegal) Mouhamed Mbaye – F, NCCU
- (Nigeria) John Ameh Peters– C, CCU
- (United Kingdom) (Brunei) Marcus Quirk – F, NFU

== Entrants ==
On June 13, P. League+ announced the entrants of the 2024 PLG draft, consist of 32 locals and 8 foreign students. On June 29, P. League+ and T1 League announced the roster of the 2024 draft combine. On July 16, the TPBL released the final list of entrants, consisting of 33 players in this edition of the draft.

- (Taiwan) Chen Chiang-Shuang – G, SHU
- (Taiwan) Chen Kuan-Chung – G, NTSU
- (Taiwan) Chiang Chun – F, FJU
- (Taiwan) Chou Chun-Hao – G, DSSH
- (Taiwan) Chou Shih-Chia – G, NTPU
- (Taiwan) Chou Ssu-Yu – G, NTUS
- (Taiwan) Chuang Po-Yuan – G, FJU
- (Taiwan) Hsu Han-Cheng – F, HDUT
- (Taiwan) Hsu Yu-Hui – G, NTSU
- (Taiwan) Hung Wei-Tse – G, TUT
- (Taiwan) Kao Wei-Lun – G, VNU
- (Taiwan) Lee Ting-Mou – F, NFU
- (Taiwan) Liao Chi-Hung – F, NTPU
- (Taiwan) Lin Chan-Yu – G, HWU
- (Taiwan) Lin Chia-Lung – F, NTUST
- (Taiwan) Lin Yu-Che – F, NTCUST
- (Taiwan) (United States) Samuel Manu – G, UC Davis
- (Taiwan) Pan Nien-Lung – G, OCU
- (Taiwan) Peng Bo-Hua – G, NTNU
- (Taiwan) Pu Kuo-Lun – C, ISU
- (Taiwan) Shih Cheng-Ping – F, ISU
- (Taiwan) Tailis Pavavaljung – G, CTBC
- (Taiwan) Tsai Chen-Kang – F, UCH
- (Taiwan) Tseng Ming-Wei – C, ISU
- (Taiwan) Wang Chia-Chang – F, NTNU
- (Taiwan) Wang Jhe-Yu – F, NTUST
- (Taiwan) Wang Shu-Fu – G, CTBC
- (Taiwan) (Vietnam) Wei Liang-Che – G, NKNU
- (Taiwan) Wu Shao-Chi – G, PCCU
- (Taiwan) Yen Tsung-Wei – C, NTUST
- (Taiwan) Yu Wei-Hao – G, NTUA
- (Taiwan) Zheng Hao-Zhe – G, NTUST
- (Taiwan) Zheng Kai-Chi – G, CCUT

Foreign student issue

On July 1, the new league preparation committee announced that foreign students will no longer be eligible for the draft due to foreign students' roster spots, which were originally available in P. League+ rule but not in T1 League. This decision made the 8 foreign students who had already applied for the draft made a joint statement on July 2 to protest for their right. The committee claimed that all 11 teams from P. League+ and T1 League had agreed the elimination of the foreign students' roster spots, but was later denied by Taipei Fubon Braves and Kaohsiung 17LIVE Steelers. On July 3, the committee said that they will rediscuss the supplementary measures and whether foreign students can join the draft. On July 11, the TPBL kept the decision to exclude foreign student from the draft but allowed teams currently without foreign students could sign one foreign student as a reserved import player.
