= 2022 T1 League draft =

2nd edition of the draft

General information
- Sport: Basketball
- Date: July 12, 2022
- Location: Syntrend Creative Park (Taipei City)
- Networks: Eleven Sports; ELTA TV; 17LIVE; T1 League on Twitch; T1 League on YouTube

Overview
- 14 total selections in 3 rounds
- League: T1 League
- First selection: No picking order in this draft

The 2022 T1 League draft was the second edition of the T1 League's annual draft. It was held on July 12, 2022, at Syntrend Creative Park in Taipei City. There were six teams joined the draft, including the Kaohsiung Aquas, New Taipei CTBC DEA, Taichung Wagor Suns, (Note: The team participated in the draft with the name of Taichung Wagor Suns on July 12, 2022. The team changed name to Taichung Suns on October.) Tainan TSG GhostHawks, TaiwanBeer HeroBears, and the Taoyuan Leopards. There were 44 players participated in the draft, and 14 players were chosen in 3 rounds.

== Draft results ==
G	Guard	F	Forward	C	Center

^{+}	Denotes player who has been selected for at least one All-Star Game
^{#}	Denotes player who has never appeared in one T1 regular season or playoff game
^{~}	Denotes player who has been selected as Rookie of the Year

Rnd.	Player	Pos.	Team	School / club team
1	Chiu Tzu-Hsuan^{+}	G/F	Kaohsiung Aquas (from DEA) (Note: July 11, 2022: New Taipei CTBC DEA to Kaohsiung Aquas: Aquas acquired 2022 first-round pick; DEA acquired cash considerations)	ISU (So.)
1	Pai Yao-Cheng^{#}	G	Kaohsiung Aquas (from DEA)	ISU (M.A.)
1	Tung Yung-Chuan	F	Taichung Wagor Suns	NTNU (Sr.)
1	Tsao Xun-Xiang^{+}	G	TaiwanBeer HeroBears	NTUA (Jr.)
1	Chen Hsiao-Jung	G	Taoyuan Leopards (5th place in 2021–22 season) (Note: On June 23, 2022, the T1 League announced that the fifth place, Taoyuan Leopards, and the sixth place, Tainan TSG GhostHawks, in the 2021–22 season acquired two selections in the first round.)	NTUST (Sr.)
1	Chen Chien-Ming	G	Taoyuan Leopards (5th place in 2021–22 season)	SHU
1	Ku Mao Wei-Chia^{+~}	G	Tainan TSG GhostHawks (6th place in 2021–22 season)	UCH (Sr.)
1	Han Chieh-Yu	F/C	Tainan TSG GhostHawks (6th place in 2021–22 season)	NTSU (Sr.)
2	Chen Yu-An	F	New Taipei CTBC DEA	UT (Sr.)
2	Lu Tsai Yu-Lun	F	TaiwanBeer HeroBears (from Suns) (Note: March 16, 2022: Taichung Wagor Suns to TaiwanBeer HeroBears: HeroBears acquired 2022 second-round pick and 2023 second-round pick; Suns acquired Chou Tzu-Hua)	Sendai (Sr.)
2	Huang Jian-Zhi^{#}	F	TaiwanBeer HeroBears (from Suns)	NTNU
2	Lin Tzu-Wei^{#}	G	Taoyuan Leopards	NKNU (Sr.)
3	Lee Ming-Xiu	G	Taichung Wagor Suns	NTUS (Sr.)
3	Huang Hung-Yu^{#}	G	TaiwanBeer HeroBears	NTNU (Sr.)

- Reference：

== Undrafted players ==
These players were not selected in the 2022 T1 League draft, but have played at least one game in the T1 League.

Player	Pos.	Join team	School / club team
Kao Cheng-En	G	Tainan TSG GhostHawks	UCH (Sr.)

== Draft combine ==
The draft combine was held at Taipei Gymnasium on July 9, 2022. There were 36 players participated in the draft combine.

== Entrants ==
On July 6, 2022, the T1 League released its official list of entrants, consisting of 44 players from college and other educational institutions in this edition of the draft.

- (Taiwan) Chang Fu-Yi – F, NTSU
- (Taiwan) Chang Shih-Wei – G/F, NTCUST
- (Taiwan) Chen Chia-Hsun – G, USC
- (Taiwan) Chen Chien-Ming – G, SHU
- (Taiwan) Chen Hsiao-Jung – G, NTUST
- (Taiwan) Chen Hung-Che – G, SHU
- (Taiwan) Chen Kuei-En – G, VNU
- (Taiwan) Chen Pin-Chuan – G, ISU
- (Taiwan) Chen Ting-Yu – F/C, CCU
- (Taiwan) Chen Yu-An – F, UT
- (Taiwan) Cheng Cheng-Yao – G, OCU
- (Taiwan) Cheng Yu-Chun – G, UT
- (Taiwan) Chiang Hao-Wei – G, HWU
- (Taiwan) Chiang Shang-Chien – G, AU
- (Taiwan) Chien Li-Chieh – G, CCU
- (Taiwan) Chiu Chia-Hao – G/F, OCU
- (Taiwan) Chiu Tzu-Hsuan – G/F, ISU
- (Taiwan) Chuang Chia-Cheng – F, NTSU
- (Taiwan) Chuang Po-Chiang – G, NKNU
- (Taiwan) Han Chieh-Yu – F/C, NTSU
- (Taiwan) Huang Hsuan-Min – G, NTUST
- (Taiwan) Huang Hung-Yu – G, NTNU
- (Taiwan) Huang Jian-Zhi – F, NTNU
- (Taiwan) Kao Cheng-En – G, UCH
- (Taiwan) Ku Mao Wei-Chia – G, UCH
- (Taiwan) Kuo Han – F/C, UCH/NTSU
- (Taiwan) Lai Chun-Ting – G/F, Grand River
- (Taiwan) Lan Chun-Yi – F, NTUST
- (Taiwan) Lee Chi – F, CYCU
- (Taiwan) Lee Ming-Xiu – G, NTUS
- (Taiwan) Lee Wei-Ting – G, SHU
- (Taiwan) Lien Wei-Sheng – G, UT
- (Taiwan) Lin Che-Ting – G, FJU
- (Taiwan) Lin Tung-Ying – G, UT
- (Taiwan) Lin Tzu-Wei – G, NKNU
- (Taiwan) Lin Yi-Chung – F, NTNU
- (Taiwan) Lin Yu-Kai – G, GBS
- (Taiwan) Lu Tsai Yu-Lun – F, Sendai
- (Taiwan) Pai Yao-Cheng – G, ISU
- (Taiwan) Shen Jui-Yang – F/C, NTUS
- (Taiwan) Tsai Ya-Hsuan – G, NPTU
- (Taiwan) (Vietnam) Tsao Xun-Xiang – G, NTUA
- (Taiwan) Tung Yung-Chuan – F, NTNU
- (Taiwan) Wu Tsung-Hsien – F, NTSU
