= 2021 P. League+ draft =

General information
- Sport: Basketball
- Date(s): July 22, 2021
- Location: online event
- Network(s): YouTube; Facebook(English Livestream)

Overview
- 16 total selections in 5 rounds
- League: P. League+
- First selection: Chu Yun-Hao (Hsinchu JKO Lioneers)

The 2021 P. League+ draft was the first edition of the draft. Originally scheduled to be held online on July 21, 2021 and broadcast on YouTube and Facebook, the P. League+ announced on July 2, 2021, that the draft would be postponed until July 22, 2021 due to the scheduling conflicts with Women's Super Basketball League draft.

== Draft selections ==
G	Guard	F	Forward	C	Center

^{x}	Denotes player who has been selected for at least one All-PLG Team
^{#}	Denotes player who has never appeared in an PLG regular season or playoff game
^{~}	Denotes player who has been selected as Rookie of the Year

Rnd.	Pick	Player	Pos.	Status	Team	School / club team
1	1	Chu Yun-Hao	F	Local	Hsinchu JKO Lioneers	UCH
1	2	Chen Yu-Wei^{x~}	G	Local	Kaohsiung Steelers	NTNU
1	3	Hung Kai-Chieh	G	Local	New Taipei Kings	NCCU
1	4	Chen Chun-Nan	G	Local	New Taipei Kings(from Pilots) (Note: July 21, 2021: Taoyuan Pilots to New Taipei Kings: Kings acquired 2021 first-round pick; Pilots acquired 2022 first-round pick)	NTSU
1	5	Lin Jyun-Hao	F	Local	Kaohsiung Steelers(from Dreamers) (Note: July 19, 2021: Formosa Taishin Dreamers to Kaohsiung Steelers: Steelers acquired 2021 first-round pick; Dreamers acquired cash considerations)	NTUA
1	6	Wang Lu-Hsiang	G	Local	Taipei Fubon Braves	CCUT
1	7	Omar Niang	C	Foreign Student	New Taipei Kings	NCCU
1	8	Lan Shao-Fu	C	Local	Kaohsiung Steelers	NTSU
2	9	Liu Chun-Ting^{#}	F	Local	Kaohsiung Steelers	UCH
2	10	Tseng Yu-Hao	F	Local	New Taipei Kings	NCCU
2	11	Wang Wei-Cheng^{#}	G	Local	Formosa Taishin Dreamers	NKNU
3	12	Lin Shih-Hsuan	G	Local	New Taipei Kings	NTNU
3	13	Cheng Te-Wei	F	Local	Kaohsiung Steelers	SHU
3	14	Wang Chen-Yuan	G	Local	Formosa Taishin Dreamers	NCCU
4	15	Matthew Yang	G	Overseas Chinese	Kaohsiung Steelers	Taichung Dreamers Academy
5	16	Austin Derrick	C	Foreign Student	Kaohsiung Steelers	UCH

== Notable undrafted players ==
These players were not selected in the 2021 P. League+ draft, but have played at least one game in the P. League+.

Player	Pos.	Status	School/club team
Su Chih-Cheng	G	Local	NTSU

== Entrants ==
=== Local ===
- Cao Li-Zhong – F, NKNU
- Chen Cheng-Hsuan – F, CCUT
- Chen Chun-Nan – G, NTSU
- Chen Po-Hung – G, CCUT
- Chen Xiao-Yu – G, ISU
- Chen Yi-Lun – G, NTSU
- Chen Yu-Wei – G, NTNU
- Cheng Te-Wei – F, SHU
- Chiu Chia-You – F, NKNU
- Chiu Chung-Po – F, ISU
- Chu En-Lin – F, NTUS
- Chu Yun-Hao – F, UCH
- Chuang Yu-Chi – F, PCCU
- Hung Kai-Chieh – G, NCCU
- Jhao De-En – F, FJU
- Lan Shao-Fu – C, NTSU
- Lee Mo-Fan – F, NTUS
- Lin Chun-En – G, UT
- Lin Jyun-Hao – F, NTUA
- Lin Shih-Hsuan – G, NTNU
- Lin Tzu-Feng – G, UCH
- Liu Chun-Ting – F, UCH
- Liu Hung-Po – F, NKNU
- Liu Rui-Xiang – G, NPTU
- Liu Shyen-Yu – G, Magee SS
- Su Chih-Cheng – G, NTSU
- Syu Shih-Hong – F, LYHS
- Tao Jyun – F, NTSU
- Tseng Yu-Hao – F, NCCU
- Wang Chen-Yuan – G, NCCU
- Wang Hong-Hao – G, UT
- Wang Hsin-Wei – G, VNU
- Wang Lu-Hsiang – G, CCUT
- Wang Wei-Cheng – G, NKNU
- Yang Jun-Jie – F, UT
- Yu Chia-Sheng – F, NPTU
- Yuan Jia-Lo – G, FJU
- Zhou Zong-Hao – G, NPTU

=== Overseas Chinese ===
- (France) Peter Guinchard – G, Cran Pringy Basket
- (United States) Matthew Yang – G, Taichung Dreamers Academy

=== Foreign student ===
- (Saint Vincent and the Grenadines) Austin Derrick – C, UCH
- (Senegal) Omar Niang – C, NCCU
