= 2023 T1 League draft =

3rd edition of the draft

General information
- Sport: Basketball
- Date: July 14, 2023
- Location: Songshan Cultural and Creative Park Warehouse 1 (Taipei City)
- Network: T1 League on YouTube

Overview
- 7 total selections in 2 rounds
- League: T1 League
- First selection: Lin Sin-Kuan (TaiwanBeer Leopards)

The 2023 T1 League draft was the third edition of the T1 League's annual draft. It was held on July 14, 2023, at Songshan Cultural and Creative Park Warehouse 1 in Taipei City. There were six teams joined the draft, including the Kaohsiung Aquas, New Taipei CTBC DEA, Taichung Suns, Tainan TSG GhostHawks, Taipei City team, (Note: On June 26, 2023, the T1 League announced that the Taishin Sports Entertainment Co., Ltd. took over the participation rights of the TaiwanBeer HeroBears. On July 8, the T1 League announced that the Taishin basketball team would participate in the draft with the name of Taipei City. On August 24, the name of Taipei Taishin basketball team was announced as Taipei Taishin Mars. The team changed name to Taipei Mars on October.) and the TaiwanBeer Leopards. (Note: On July 4, 2023, the Taoyuan Leopards announced to cooperate with the Taiwan Beer basketball association, and the Taoyuan Leopards changed the name to TaiwanBeer Leopards.) There were 41 players participated in the draft, and 7 players were chosen in 2 rounds.

== Draft order ==
The draft order was based on the ranking of the 2022–23 season. On June 26, 2023, the T1 League announced that the Taishin Sports Entertainment Co., Ltd. took over the participation rights of the TaiwanBeer HeroBears. On June 27, the T1 League announced that the Taishin basketball team acquired the draft rights from the TaiwanBeer HeroBears (first-round 4th pick and second-round pick traded from Taichung Wagor Suns). And the Taishin basketball team acquired the second pick and the last pick (additional draft rights) in each round.

T1 League	Draft order							
T1 League	1st	2nd	3rd	4th	5th	6th	7th	8th
1st round	Leopards	Taishin	Suns	Taishin	Aquas	GhostHawks	DEA	Taishin
2nd round	Leopards	Taishin	Taishin (Note: March 16, 2022: Taichung Wagor Suns to TaiwanBeer HeroBears: HeroBears acquired 2022 second-round pick and 2023 second-round pick; Suns acquired Chou Tzu-Hua; June 26, 2023: The T1 League announced that the Taishin Sports Entertainment Co., Ltd. took over the participation rights of the TaiwanBeer HeroBears.)	Aquas	GhostHawks	DEA	Taishin	—N/a
3rd round	Leopards	Taishin	Suns	Aquas	GhostHawks	DEA	Taishin	—N/a
↓	Leopards	Taishin	Suns	Aquas	GhostHawks	DEA	Taishin	—N/a

== Draft results ==
G	Guard	F	Forward	C	Center

^{x}	Denotes player who has been selected for at least one All-T1 League Team
^{#}	Denotes player who has never appeared in one T1 regular season or playoff game
^{~}	Denotes player who has been selected as Rookie of the Year

Rnd.	Pick	Player	Pos.	Team	School / club team
1	1	Lin Sin-Kuan	F	TaiwanBeer Leopards	NTNU (Jr.)
1	2	Gao Jin-Wei^{x~}	G	TaiwanBeer Leopards (from Taishin) (Note: July 12, 2023: Taipei Taishin basketball team to TaiwanBeer Leopards: Leopards acquired 2023 first-round 2nd pick; Taishin acquired Huang Tsung-Han and 2024 first-round pick)	UCH (Sr.)
1	3	Chang Chao-Chen	F	Taipei City (from Suns) (Note: July 12, 2023: Taichung Suns to Taipei Taishin basketball team: Taishin acquired 2023 first-round pick; Suns acquired 2023 second-round 3rd pick and 2024 second-round pick)	NTNU (Sr.)
1	4	Chien Ho-Yu^{#}	G	Taipei City	SHU (Sr.)
1	5	Tang Wei-Chieh	G	Kaohsiung Aquas	VMI (Sr.)
1	6	Li Pei-Cheng	G	New Taipei CTBC DEA	FJU (Sr.)
2	7	Guo Zhen-Fu^{#}	F	Taichung Suns (from Taishin)	NKNU (Sr.)

- Reference：

== Undrafted players ==
These players were not selected in the 2023 T1 League draft, but have played at least one game in the T1 League.

Player	Pos.	Join team	School / club team
Hsu Ching-En	F	Taipei Mars	NTNU (Sr.)
Lin Li	G	Taipei Mars	NCCU (Sr.)
Liu Yen-Ting	F	Taipei Mars	OCU (Jr.)
Wu Pei-Chia	C	Taiwan Beer Leopards	SHU (Sr.)

== Draft combine ==
The draft combine was held at National Taiwan University of Arts on July 8, 2023. There were 36 players participated in the draft combine. Li Pei-Cheng was awarded the Most Outstanding Player in the rookie contest.

== Entrants ==
On June 27, 2023, the T1 League released its official list of entrants, consisting of 43 players from college and other educational institutions in this edition of the draft. On July 8, the T1 League announced that Ting Kuan-Hao and Wang Yi-Fan applied to quit the draft. On July 10, the T1 League released the final list of entrants, consisting of 41 players in this edition of the draft.

- (Taiwan) Chang Chao-Chen – F, NTNU
- (Taiwan) Chen Hao-Xiang – F, NTSU
- (Taiwan) Chen Li-Hsing – G, NTSU
- (Taiwan) Chen Lung – F, CCU
- (Taiwan) Chen Yi – G, GWU
- (Taiwan) Chen Zhao-Qun – F, NTUST
- (Taiwan) Chiang Hao-Wen – G, NTNU
- (Taiwan) Chiao Chu-Yu – F, FJU
- (Taiwan) Chien Ho-Yu – G, SHU
- (Taiwan) Chuang Wei-Chieh – G, FJU
- (Taiwan) Fan Zhe-Hao – G, STU
- (Taiwan) Gao Jin-Wei – G, UCH
- (Taiwan) Guo Zhen-Fu – F, NKNU
- (Taiwan) Hsieh Cheng-An – F, NTSU
- (Taiwan) Hsiung Che-Yen – G, CCU
- (Taiwan) Hsu Ching-En – F, NTNU
- (Taiwan) Lee Cheng-En – G, UT
- (Taiwan) Li Pei-Cheng – G, FJU
- (Taiwan) Liang Yu-Lun – F, UT
- (Taiwan) Liao Ching-Tai – C, NKNU
- (Taiwan) Lin Chi-Han – G, UT
- (Taiwan) Lin Li – G, NCCU
- (Taiwan) Lin Ming-Wei – G, OCU
- (Taiwan) Lin Sin-Kuan – F, NTNU
- (Taiwan) Lin Tzu-Chun – G, NTUS
- (Taiwan) Liu Cheng-Yen – G, ISU
- (Taiwan) Liu Chia-Yuan – G, OCU
- (Taiwan) Liu Guang-Shang – F, FJU
- (Taiwan) Liu Yen-Ting – F, OCU
- (Taiwan) Su Pei-Kai – F, NTUA
- (Taiwan) Tang Wei-Chieh – G, VMI
- (Taiwan) Tsai Houng-Yang – G, FJU
- (Taiwan) Tsai Zhen-Yueh – F, NKNU
- (Taiwan) Tu Yi-Han – F, NCCU
- (Taiwan) Wang Cheng-Wen – F, ISU
- (Taiwan) Wang Wei-Ting – F, NTUB
- (Taiwan) Wu Chun-An – F, OCU
- (Taiwan) Wu Pei-Chia – C, SHU
- (Taiwan) Wu Shao-Qi – G, CCU
- (Taiwan) Wu Zheng-Xin – F, CUMT
- (Taiwan) Yang Hao-Wei – G, CCU
