= 2023–24 Taichung Suns season =

Taiwanese professional basketball season

- President: Sun Tzu-Chuan
- General Manager: Wang Wei-Chieh
- Head Coach: Anthony Tucker (left the team)

The 2023–24 Taichung Suns season was scheduled to be the franchise's third season.

On June 29, 2023, the Suns announced that Chris Gavina left the team. On July 1, the Suns hired Anthony Tucker as their new head coach. On September 15, the T1 League announced that the 2023–24 season participation rights of the Taichung Suns was cancelled due to financial qualification. On October 13, the news reported that Anthony Tucker left the team. On October 16, the Suns announced to fold officially.

== Draft ==
| Round | Pick | Player | Position(s) | School / club team |
|---|---|---|---|---|
| 2 | 7 | Guo Zhen-Fu | Forward | NKNU |

- Reference：

On March 16, 2022, the Suns' 2022 and 2023 second-round picks were traded to TaiwanBeer HeroBears in exchange for Chou Tzu-Hua.

On July 12, 2023, the Suns' 2023 first-round pick was traded to Taipei Taishin basketball team in exchange for 2023 second-round 3rd pick and 2024 second-round pick.

On July 27, 2023, the second rounder, Guo Zhen-Fu had joined the Bank of Taiwan of the Super Basketball League.

== Transactions ==
On July 8, 2023, Su Po-Chang signed with Taichung Suns.

On July 10, 2023, Tseng Pin-Fu signed with Taichung Suns.

On July 17, 2023, Deyonta Davis signed with Taichung Suns. On October 5, Deyonta Davis signed with Goyang Sono Skygunners of the Korean Basketball League.

On July 30, 2023, Nuni Omot signed with Taichung Suns.

On August 8, 2023, Lan Shao-Fu signed with Taichung Suns.

On August 16, 2023, Davion Warren signed with Taichung Suns.

On October 13, 2023, the news reported that all import players left the team.

On October 16, 2023, the Taichung Suns announced to fold officially.

=== Overview ===
Players added

Via free agency

- Deyonta Davis
- Lan Shao-Fu
- Nuni Omot
- Su Po-Chang
- Tseng Pin-Fu
- Davion Warren
Players lost

Via free agency

- Keith Benson
- Aaron Geramipoor
- Arnett Moultrie
- Rayvonte Rice

Waived

- Chen Wen-Hung
- Deyonta Davis
- Austin Derrick
- Nuni Omot
- Ting Sheng-Ju
- Davion Warren
- Wen Li-Huang

Team folded

- Delgerchuluun Bayasgalan
- Kao Meng-Wei
- Derek King
- Lan Shao-Fu
- Lee Ming-Xiu
- Lin Ming-Yi
- Lu Kuan-Hsuan
- Peng Chun-Yen
- Su Po-Chang
- Su Yi-Chin
- Tseng Pin-Fu
- Tung Yung-Chuan
- Yang Cheng-Han

=== Trades ===
| Date | Trade | | Ref. |
|---|---|---|---|
| July 12, 2023 | To Taichung Suns: 2023 Taishin's second-round 3rd pick; 2024 Taishin's second-round pick | To Taipei Taishin basketball team: 2023 Suns' first-round pick | |

=== Free agency ===
==== Re-signed ====
| Date | Player | Contract terms | Ref. |
|---|---|---|---|
| July 6, 2023 | Yang Cheng-Han | 2-year extension contract, worth unknown | |

==== Subtractions ====
| Date | Player | Reason | New team | Ref. |
|---|---|---|---|---|
| June 16, 2023 | Keith Benson | Contract expired | (Syria) Al Wahda SC | |
| June 30, 2023 | Austin Derrick | Contract terminated | (Thailand) Pathum Thani Pythons | |
| July 3, 2023 | Ting Sheng-Ju | Contract terminated | (Taiwan) Taipei Taishin | |
| July 4, 2023 | Chen Wen-Hung | Contract terminated | (Taiwan) Taipei Taishin | |
| August 3, 2023 | Wen Li-Huang | Contract terminated | —N/a | |
| August 10, 2023 | Aaron Geramipoor | Contract expired | (Taiwan) Kaohsiung Aquas | |
| August 21, 2023 | Rayvonte Rice | Contract expired | (Lebanon) Sagesse SC | |
| October 13, 2023 | Arnett Moultrie | Contract expired | (China) Qingdao Eagles | |
| October 16, 2023 | Kao Meng-Wei | Team folded | —N/a | |
| October 16, 2023 | Peng Chun-Yen | Team folded → Retirement | (Taiwan) DLJH basketball team assistant coach | |
| October 16, 2023 | Delgerchuluun Bayasgalan | Team folded | (Taiwan) Tainan TSG GhostHawks | |
| October 16, 2023 | Yang Cheng-Han | Team folded | (Taiwan) Yulon Luxgen Dinos | |
| October 16, 2023 | Lee Ming-Xiu | Team folded | —N/a | |
| October 16, 2023 | Tung Yung-Chuan | Team folded | Taiwan Beer | |
| October 16, 2023 | Derek King | Team folded | (Hong Kong) VantaBlack Dragons | |
| October 16, 2023 | Su Yi-Chin | Team folded | (Taiwan) Tainan TSG GhostHawks | |
| October 16, 2023 | Lu Kuan-Hsuan | Team folded | (Taiwan) Hsinchu Lioneers | |
| October 16, 2023 | Lin Ming-Yi | Team folded | (Taiwan) Yulon Luxgen Dinos | |
