= Taichung Suns all-time roster =

The following was a list of players, both past and current, who appeared at least in one game for the Taichung Suns (2022–2023) or Taichung Wagor Suns (2021–2022) franchise.

== Players ==
Note: Statistics are correct through the end of the 2022–23 T1 League season.

G	Guard	PG	Point guard	SG	Shooting guard	G/F	Guard-forward	F	Forward	SF	Small forward	PF	Power forward	F/C	Forward-center	C	Center

^{+}	Denotes player who had been selected for at least one All-Star Game with the Taichung Suns
0.0	Denotes the Taichung Suns statistics leader (min. 30 games played for the team for per-game statistics)

=== B ===
Player	Name	Nat.	Pos.	From	Yrs	Seasons	Statistics									Ref.
Player	Name	Nat.	Pos.	From	Yrs	Seasons	GP	MP	PTS	REB	AST	MPG	PPG	RPG	APG	Ref.
Delgerchuluun Bayasgalan	白薩	(Mongolia)	PG	HDUT	1	2022–2023	28	658:40	181	70	108	23:31	6.5	2.5	3.9	
Keith Benson	班森	(United States)	PF/C	Oakland	1	2022–2023	10	214:43	70	95	10	21:28	7.0	9.5	1.0	
Tony Bishop	陛下	(Panama) (United States)	SF	Texas State	1	2022–2023	12	425:22	266	133	54	35:26	22.2	11.1	4.5	

=== C ===
Player	Name	Nat.	Pos.	From	Yrs	Seasons	Statistics									Ref.
Player	Name	Nat.	Pos.	From	Yrs	Seasons	GP	MP	PTS	REB	AST	MPG	PPG	RPG	APG	Ref.
Niño Canaleta	尼奧	(Philippines)	SF	UE	2	2021–2023	2	32:52	13	6	1	16:26	6.5	3.0	0.5	
Chen Ching-Huan	陳靖寰	(Taiwan)	SF	FJU	2	2021–2023	41	1228:27	346	117	95	29:57	8.4	2.9	2.3	
Chen Wen-Hung	陳文宏	(Taiwan)	SF	NTSU	2	2021–2023	55	1045:13	205	143	64	19:00	3.7	2.6	1.2	
Chiu Po-Chang	邱柏璋	(Taiwan)	SF	NTUA	1	2021–2022	21	141:20	48	25	3	6:43	2.3	1.2	0.1	
Chou Tzu-Hua	周資華	(Taiwan)	PG	FJU	1	2021–2022	9	83:57	13	8	14	9:19	1.4	0.9	1.6	

=== D ===
Player	Name	Nat.	Pos.	From	Yrs	Seasons	Statistics									Ref.
Player	Name	Nat.	Pos.	From	Yrs	Seasons	GP	MP	PTS	REB	AST	MPG	PPG	RPG	APG	Ref.
Austin Derrick	戴瑞騰	(Saint Vincent and the Grenadines)	C	UCH	1	2022–2023	1	18:36	6	9	0	18:36	6.0	9.0	0.0	

=== G ===
Player	Name	Nat.	Pos.	From	Yrs	Seasons	Statistics									Ref.
Player	Name	Nat.	Pos.	From	Yrs	Seasons	GP	MP	PTS	REB	AST	MPG	PPG	RPG	APG	Ref.
Alonzo Gee	吉	(United States)	SF	Alabama	1	2021–2022	5	164:13	54	40	17	32:50	10.8	8.0	3.4	
Aaron Geramipoor^{+}	艾倫	(United Kingdom) (Iran)	C	Seton Hall	2	2021–2023	21	629:21	338	188	35	29:58	16.1	9.0	1.7	

=== H ===
Player	Name	Nat.	Pos.	From	Yrs	Seasons	Statistics									Ref.
Player	Name	Nat.	Pos.	From	Yrs	Seasons	GP	MP	PTS	REB	AST	MPG	PPG	RPG	APG	Ref.
Jordan Heading	何喬登	(Philippines) (Australia)	SG	California Baptist	1	2021–2022	29	927:31	578	134	71	31:59	19.9	4.6	2.4	

=== J ===
Player	Name	Nat.	Pos.	From	Yrs	Seasons	Statistics									Ref.
Player	Name	Nat.	Pos.	From	Yrs	Seasons	GP	MP	PTS	REB	AST	MPG	PPG	RPG	APG	Ref.
Marlon Johnson^{+}	馬龍	(United States)	F	New Mexico Highlands	1	2022–2023	9	277:17	138	81	29	30:48	15.3	9.0	3.2	

=== K ===
Player	Name	Nat.	Pos.	From	Yrs	Seasons	Statistics									Ref.
Player	Name	Nat.	Pos.	From	Yrs	Seasons	GP	MP	PTS	REB	AST	MPG	PPG	RPG	APG	Ref.
Kao Meng-Wei	高孟偉	(Taiwan)	PG	NTCUST	1	2021–2022	4	14:46	0	1	1	3:41	0.0	0.3	0.3	
Derek King	金德偉	(United States) (Taiwan)	SG/SF	UC Berkeley	1	2022–2023	15	189:37	44	22	8	12:38	2.9	1.5	0.5	

=== L ===
Player	Name	Nat.	Pos.	From	Yrs	Seasons	Statistics									Ref.
Player	Name	Nat.	Pos.	From	Yrs	Seasons	GP	MP	PTS	REB	AST	MPG	PPG	RPG	APG	Ref.
Lee Ming-Xiu	李明修	(Taiwan)	PG	NTUS	1	2022–2023	7	40:35	17	3	3	5:47	2.4	0.4	0.4	
Li Ping-Hung	李秉鴻	(Taiwan)	PG	NTNU	1	2021–2022	28	327:00	69	36	25	11:40	2.5	1.3	0.9	
Lin Ming-Yi	林明毅	(Taiwan)	PG	MDU	1	2022–2023	14	202:54	36	24	26	14:29	2.6	1.7	1.9	
Lu Kuan-Hsuan	盧冠軒	(Taiwan)	SG	NTNU	1	2022–2023	29	933:58	325	63	90	32:12	11.2	2.2	3.1	

=== M ===
Player	Name	Nat.	Pos.	From	Yrs	Seasons	Statistics									Ref.
Player	Name	Nat.	Pos.	From	Yrs	Seasons	GP	MP	PTS	REB	AST	MPG	PPG	RPG	APG	Ref.
Arnett Moultrie	莫爾特里	(United States)	PF/C	Mississippi State	1	2022–2023	10	358:21	202	101	23	35:50	20.2	10.1	2.3	

=== P ===
Player	Name	Nat.	Pos.	From	Yrs	Seasons	Statistics									Ref.
Player	Name	Nat.	Pos.	From	Yrs	Seasons	GP	MP	PTS	REB	AST	MPG	PPG	RPG	APG	Ref.
Peng Chun-Yen	彭俊諺	(Taiwan)	PG	MDU	1	2022–2023	9	110:38	0	19	22	12:17	0.0	2.1	2.4	
Raphiael Putney	拉菲爾	(United States)	SF/PF	UMass	1	2022–2023	3	76:57	22	27	8	25:39	7.3	9.0	2.7	

=== R ===
Player	Name	Nat.	Pos.	From	Yrs	Seasons	Statistics									Ref.
Player	Name	Nat.	Pos.	From	Yrs	Seasons	GP	MP	PTS	REB	AST	MPG	PPG	RPG	APG	Ref.
Rayvonte Rice	萊斯	(United States)	SG	Illinois	1	2022–2023	14	508:39	420	102	40	36:19	30.0	7.3	2.9	

=== S ===
Player	Name	Nat.	Pos.	From	Yrs	Seasons	Statistics									Ref.
Player	Name	Nat.	Pos.	From	Yrs	Seasons	GP	MP	PTS	REB	AST	MPG	PPG	RPG	APG	Ref.
Sani Sakakini	桑尼	(Palestine)	PF	JUST	1	2021–2022	29	1103:08	719	408	145	38:02	24.8	14.1	5.0	
Diamond Stone	仕東	(United States)	C	Maryland	1	2022–2023	8	228:16	180	77	16	28:32	22.5	9.6	2.0	
Su Yi-Chin	蘇奕晉	(Taiwan)	PF	MDU	2	2021–2023	55	1250:06	390	207	94	22:43	7.1	3.8	1.7	
Sun Szu-Yao	孫思堯	(Taiwan)	C	NYIT	1	2021–2022	29	227:07	50	53	7	7:49	1.7	1.8	0.2	

=== T ===
Player	Name	Nat.	Pos.	From	Yrs	Seasons	Statistics									Ref.
Player	Name	Nat.	Pos.	From	Yrs	Seasons	GP	MP	PTS	REB	AST	MPG	PPG	RPG	APG	Ref.
Ting Sheng-Ju	丁聖儒	(Taiwan)	PG	St. Francis	2	2021–2023	37	1149:23	361	125	143	31:03	9.8	3.4	3.9	
Jordan Tolbert	喬丹	(United States)	PF	SMU	1	2022–2023	4	105:52	48	33	8	26:28	12.0	8.3	2.0	
Anthony Tucker	塔克	(United States)	PG	Minnesota	1	2021–2022	18	569:33	372	124	105	31:38	20.7	6.9	5.8	
Tung Yung-Chuan	董永全	(Taiwan)	SF	NTNU	1	2022–2023	11	96:16	26	9	2	8:45	2.4	0.8	0.2	

=== W ===
Player	Name	Nat.	Pos.	From	Yrs	Seasons	Statistics									Ref.
Player	Name	Nat.	Pos.	From	Yrs	Seasons	GP	MP	PTS	REB	AST	MPG	PPG	RPG	APG	Ref.
Wen Li-Huang	溫立煌	(Taiwan)	PF	ISU	1	2022–2023	28	344:01	86	64	23	12:17	3.1	2.3	0.8	
Julian Wright	萊特	(United States)	PF	Kansas	1	2021–2022	22	473:26	200	155	63	21:31	9.1	7.0	2.9	

=== Y ===
Player	Name	Nat.	Pos.	From	Yrs	Seasons	Statistics									Ref.
Player	Name	Nat.	Pos.	From	Yrs	Seasons	GP	MP	PTS	REB	AST	MPG	PPG	RPG	APG	Ref.
Yang Cheng-Han	楊承翰	(Taiwan)	SG	FJU	1	2021–2022	11	89:56	14	6	4	8:10	1.3	0.5	0.4	
Yu Chu-Hsiang	尤楚翔	(Taiwan)	PF	SHU	1	2021–2022	5	11:59	2	0	0	2:23	0.4	0.0	0.0	
