= Chen Hung-chang =

Taiwanese politician

- 陳宏昌
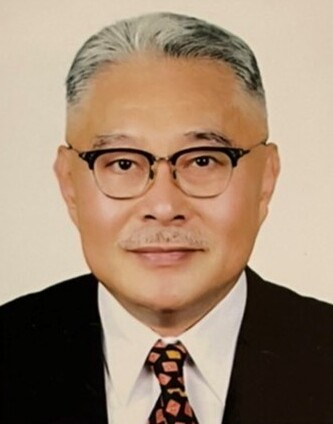

Member of the Legislative Yuan
- In office 1 February 1993 – 31 January 1996
- Constituency: Taipei County
- In office 1 February 1996 – 31 January 2005
- Constituency: Taipei County 2

Personal details
- Born: 2 March 1956 (age 70) Taiwan
- Party: Independent
- Other political affiliations: Kuomintang (until 2019)
- Parent: Chen Wan-fu (father)
- Education: Sze Hai College of Technology and Commerce; University of the East
- Occupation: Politician

Chen Hung-chang (Chinese: 陳宏昌; pinyin: Chén Hóngchāng; born 2 March 1956) is a Taiwanese politician.

== Education ==
Chen attended Luzhou Elementary School and New Taipei Municipal Luzhou High School. He graduated from the Sze Hai College of Technology and Commerce before he finished his studies at the University of the East in the Philippines.

== Political career ==
Chen was elected to the Legislative Yuan in 1992, representing Taipei County. He was elected to represent Taipei County 2 in 1995, 1998, and 2001. Chen did not vote for the Kuomintang party caucus during his time in legislature. Chen proposed that Ma Ying-jeou and Wang Jin-pyng form a Kuomintang presidential ticket before the Pan-Blue Coalition presidential ticket for the 2004 presidential election were finalised. Chen was outspoken about a proposal to merge the People First Party into the Kuomintang after the coalition ticket of Lien Chan and James Soong lost the election.

When he left the legislature at the end of his fourth term, Chen led the Luzhou Younglian Temple in New Taipei City. He also served on the Kuomintang Central Review Committee.

Chen got his party membership revoked after statements of the Kuomintang's 2020 presidential candidate, Han Kuo-yu, in August 2019. Chen remained a political independent after his expulsion.

== Personal life ==
Chen has a son.
