= Polytechnic University Taiwan - Paraguay =

Public university in Paraguay

Taiwan-Paraguay Polytechnic University
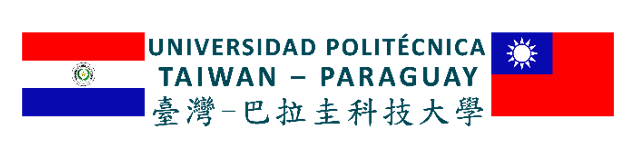
- Type: Public university
- Established: May 31, 2018; 8 years ago
- Director, Taiwan Tech Paraguay Project Office: Dr. Yao-Chung Chen
- Location: Luque, Paraguay

Taiwan-Paraguay Polytechnic University (Chinese: 臺灣-巴拉圭科技大學, Spanish: Universidad Politécnica Taiwán - Paraguay), abbreviated as 台巴科大 or UPTP, is a technological university located in Asunción, Paraguay. It is a public university jointly established by National Taiwan University of Science and Technology and the government of Paraguay.

UPTP comprises four departments supported by faculty from National Taiwan University of Science and Technology. The physical campus is yet to be constructed, and the inaugural students spent two years in Taiwan before graduating.

== History and current status ==
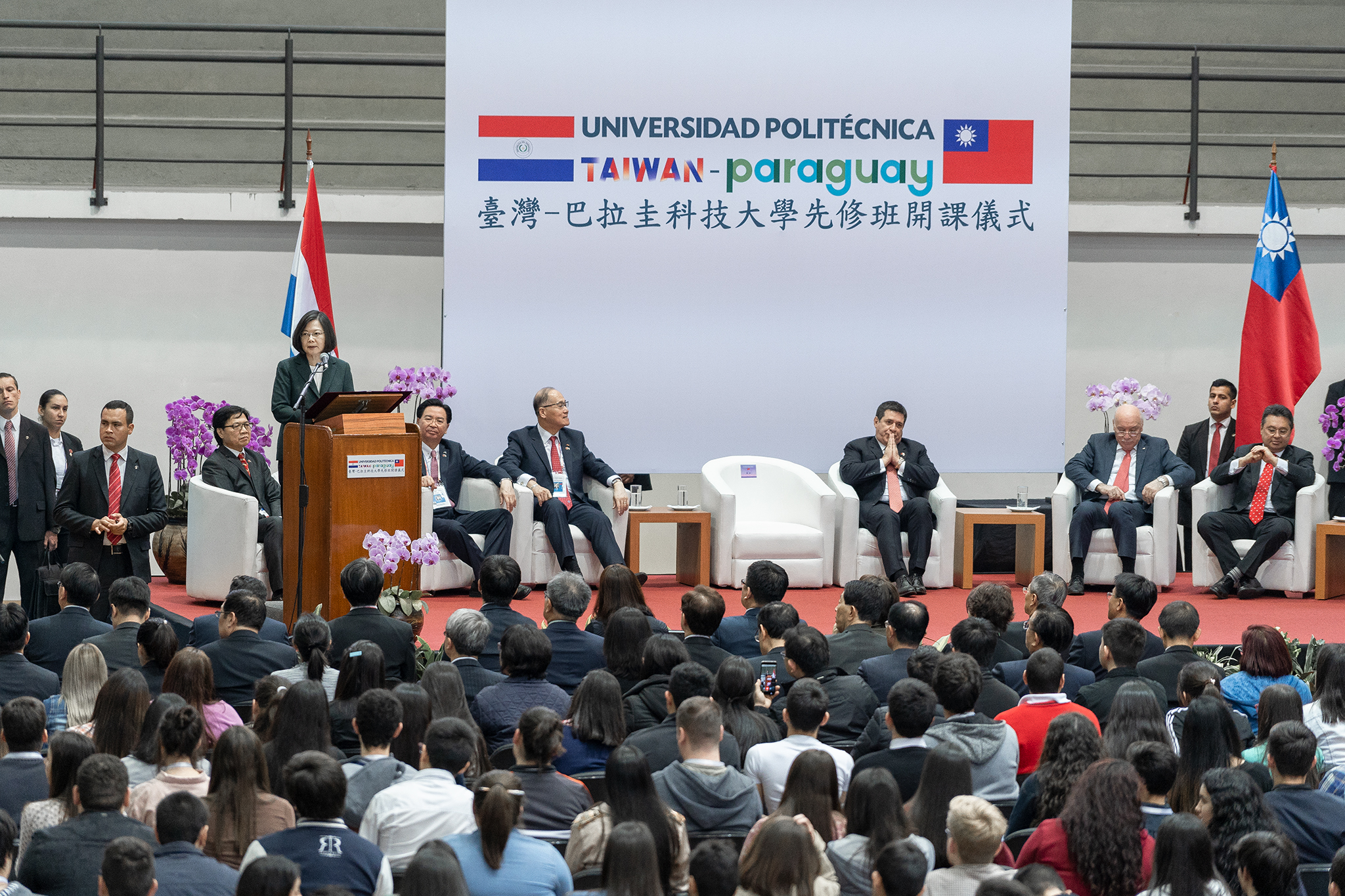
President Tsai attends the unveiling ceremony for UPTP.

UPTP originated from a vision set during the 60th anniversary of diplomatic relations between the Presidents of Taiwan and Paraguay, Tsai Ing-wen and Horacio Cartes respectively, in 2017. On December 5, 2017, an agreement was signed by the then Ambassador of Taiwan to Paraguay and the Minister of Industry of Paraguay, Gustavo Leite. On May 31, 2018, Paraguay enacted Law No. 6096/18, officially establishing UPTP.

On August 15, 2018, UPTP launched preparatory courses in Mathematics and English, attracting over 4,000 applicants. There were 400 spots available in the preparatory courses, with 100 students progressing to the university program from these courses.

On March 12, 2019, UPTP admitted its first batch of students, totaling 108 students. The inaugural 109 students spent their initial two years of study at the Paraguayan Olympic Committee facilities. On March 20, UPTP officially commenced classes.

The first cohort of students graduated on July 31, 2023, marking the completion of five years since the inception of the university.

== Academic units ==
- Department of Mechanical Engineering
- Department of Information Engineering
- Department of Civil Engineering
- Department of Industrial Engineering
