= Panyapiwat Institute of Management =

Panyapiwat Institute of Management (PIM, Thai: สถาบันการจัดการปัญญาภิวัฒน์) is a higher education establishment in Thailand. It was founded in 2007 by CP All, the retail arm of the Thai conglomerate CP Group and the country's operator of 7-Eleven convenience stores. The institute specialises in work-based learning, and serves as a feeder of personnel for CP's businesses.
