= CTBC Business School =

Education organization in Tainan City, Taiwan

- 中信金融管理學院
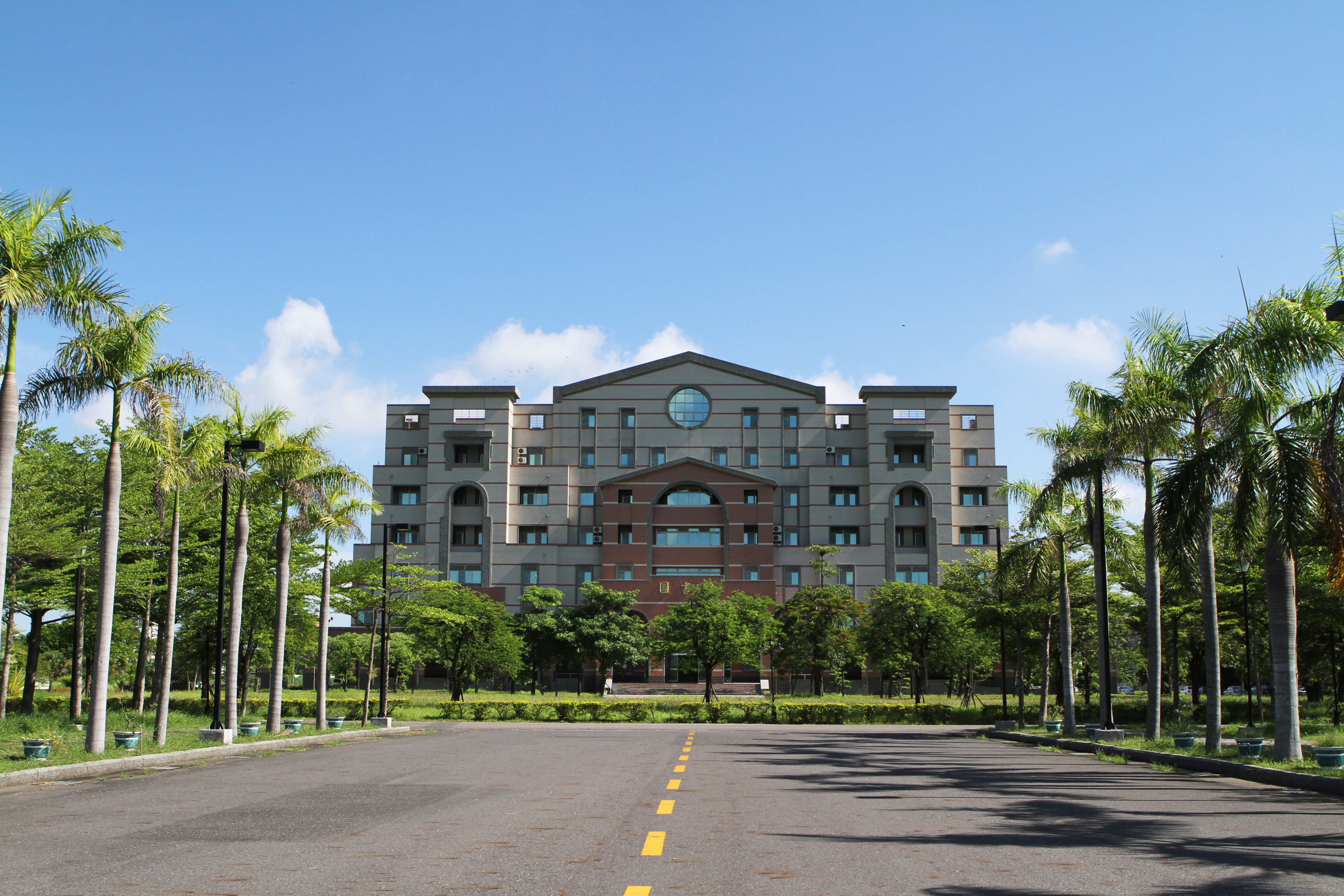
- Motto in English: Promote public interest, and support the underprivileged and talented
- Established: August 2000 (as Hsing-Kuo University); June 2015 (as CTBC Business School)
- Location: Annan, Tainan, Taiwan; 23°03′49.1″N 120°09′43.9″E
- Website: Official website

CTBC Business School
- Traditional Chinese: 中信金融管理學院
Transcriptions
Standard Mandarin
- Hanyu Pinyin: zhongxìn jinróng Guǎnlǐ Xuéyuàn
- Bopomofo: ㄓㄨㄥ ㄒㄧㄣˋ ㄐㄧㄣ ㄖㄨㄥˊ ㄍㄨㄢˇ ㄌㄧˇ ㄒㄩㄝˊ ㄩㄢˋ
Southern Min
- Hokkien POJ: Tiong-sìn Kim-iông Koán-lí Ha̍k-īⁿ

CTBC Business School (Chinese: 中信金融管理學院; Pe̍h-ōe-jī: Tiong-sìn Kim-iông Koán-lí Ha̍k-īⁿ) is a private university located in Annan District, Tainan, Taiwan.

The school offers a range of undergraduate and graduate programs in business, including Bachelor's degrees in Finance, Accounting, Information Management, and International Business, as well as Master's degrees in Finance, Business Administration, and Accounting. It also offers a Doctorate in Finance program.

== History ==
The college was originally established in August 2000 as Hsing-Kuo University. In June 2015, the CTBC Financial Holding took over the funding and management of the college and the school was renamed to CTBC Business School.

== Faculty ==
- Department of Banking and Finance
- Department of Business Administration
- Department of Business and Economic Law
- Department of Artificial Intelligence
- Undergraduate Program of Financial Management College
- LL.M. Business and Economic Law
- Graduate School of Financial Management

== Partner institutions ==
=== Asia ===
Korea	Seokyeong University
Philippines	Lyceum of the Philippines University
Philippines	Miriam College
Malaysia	Universiti Tunku Abdul Rahman
Malaysia	Universiti Sains Malaysia
Japan	Wasaeda University - Graduate School of Information, Production and Systems
Japan	Hosei University
Japan	Kindai University
Thailand	Panyapiwat Institute of Management
Thailand	Kasersart University Faculty of Economics
Thailand	Bangkok Thonburi University
Hong Kong	Hang Seng Management College
Vietnam	FPT University
Vietnam	Nguyen Tat Thanh University
Indonesia	STIE Perbanas Surabaya
Indonesia	Widya Karya Catholic University
Indonesia	Widya Mandala Catholic University
Indonesia	Universitas Sanata Dharma
Indonesia	Atma Jaya Catholic University of Indonesia
India	Dr. M.G.R. Educational and Research Institute
India	Amity University
India	Indian Institute of Management Kashipur

=== North and South America ===
USA	Wharton School
USA	Seattle Central College
USA	The Regents of the University of California
USA	University at Albany, State University of New York
USA	Springfield College
USA	Hartwick College
USA	University of Houston-Downtown
USA	Southern New Hampshire University
USA	Temple University
Canada	Medicine Hat College
Mexico	Universidad Autonoma de Baja California

=== Europe ===
France	Rennes School of Business
Romania	National University of Political Studies and Public Administration
Romania	Dimitrie Cantemir Christian University
England	University of Hull
Germany	SRH Hochschule Heidelberg
Italy	Universita Cattolica Del Sacro Cuore

== See also ==
- CTBC University of Technology
- List of universities in Taiwan
- CTBC Financial Holding
- CTBC Bank
- CTBC Brothers
