= HungKuo Delin University of Technology =

University in Tucheng, New Taipei, Taiwan

- 宏國德霖科技大學
- Type: private
- Established: 1972 (as Sze Hai College of Technology); 1991 (as Sze Hai College of Technology and Commerce); 2001 (as De Lin Institute of Technology); 2017 (as HungKuo Delin University of Technology)
- President: Lo Ship-peng, Ph.D.
- Location: Tucheng, New Taipei, Taiwan; 24.972894°N 121.458461°E
- Website: Official website

HungKuo Delin University of Technology
- Traditional Chinese: 宏國德霖科技大學
Transcriptions
Standard Mandarin
- Hanyu Pinyin: hóng guó dé lín kē jì dà xué
Southern Min
- Hokkien POJ: Hông-kok Tek-lîm Kho-ki Tāi-ha̍k

HungKuo Delin University of Technology (HDUT; Chinese: 宏國德霖科技大學; Pe̍h-ōe-jī: Hông-kok Tek-lîm Kho-ki Tāi-ha̍k) is a private university in Tucheng District, New Taipei City, Taiwan.

HHUT offers undergraduate and graduate programs in a range of fields, including mechanical engineering, electrical engineering, computer science, business administration, visual communication design, and cultural and creative industries.

The university has six colleges: the College of Engineering, the College of Business, the College of Design, the College of Humanities and Social Sciences, the College of Information and Communication, and the College of Law and Public Affairs.

== History ==
HungKuo Delin University of Technology was founded in 1972 as Sze Hai College of Technology. In 1978, the HungKuo Construction and its affiliates took over the management of the college. In 1991, the school changed its name to Sze Hai College of Technology and Commerce. In 2001, it was ungraded to De Lin Institute of Technology. In 2017, the school changed its name to HungKuo Delin University of Technology.

== Academics ==
- College of Engineering
  - Department of Mechanical Engineering
  - Department of Civil Engineering
  - Department of Electronics Engineering
  - Department of Computer Science and Information Engineering
  - Department of Computer and Communication Engineering
- College of Management and Design
  - Department of Business Administration
  - Department of Applied English
    - Department of Applied Foreign Languages
  - Department of Real Estate Management
  - Department of Spatial and Interior Design
  - Department of Creative Product Design
- College of Human Ecology
  - Department of Leisure Business Management
  - Department of Hospitality Management
  - Department of Culinary Arts
  - Department of MICE and Tourism
- General Education Center
- Foreign Language Center

== Notable alumni ==
- Chen Hung-chang, member of Legislative Yuan (1993–2005)

== Transportation ==
The university is accessible within walking distance east of Tucheng Station of the Taipei Metro.

== See also ==
- List of universities in Taiwan
