= University of Taipei =

University in Taipei, Taiwan

- 臺北市立大學
- Motto: 公、誠、勤、樸
- Type: Public
- Established: August 2013
- Rector: Dr. Yin-Hao Elton Chiu
- Students: 7,500
- Location: Taipei, Taiwan; 25°02′10″N 121°30′49″E
- Website: www.utaipei.edu.tw

University of Taipei
- Traditional Chinese: 臺北市立大學
- Simplified Chinese: 台北市立大学
Transcriptions
Standard Mandarin
- Hanyu Pinyin: Táiběi Shìlì Dàxué
- Bopomofo: ㄊㄞˊ ㄅㄟˇ ㄕˋ ㄌㄧˋ ㄉㄚˋ ㄒㄩㄝˊ
Southern Min
- Tâi-lô: Tâi-pak tshī-li̍p tāi-ha̍k

University of Taipei (UT; Chinese: 臺北市立大學; lit. 'Taipei Municipal University') is a public university in Taipei, Taiwan. Located in Taipei metropolitan area, the university has two campuses, the Tianmu Campus in Shilin District and the Bo'ai Campus in Zhongzheng District. It is the only university under the administration of Taipei City Government.

Established by the merger of Taipei Municipal University of Education and the Taipei Physical Education College in August 2013, University of Taipei can trace its roots to the late 19th century.

== Academics ==
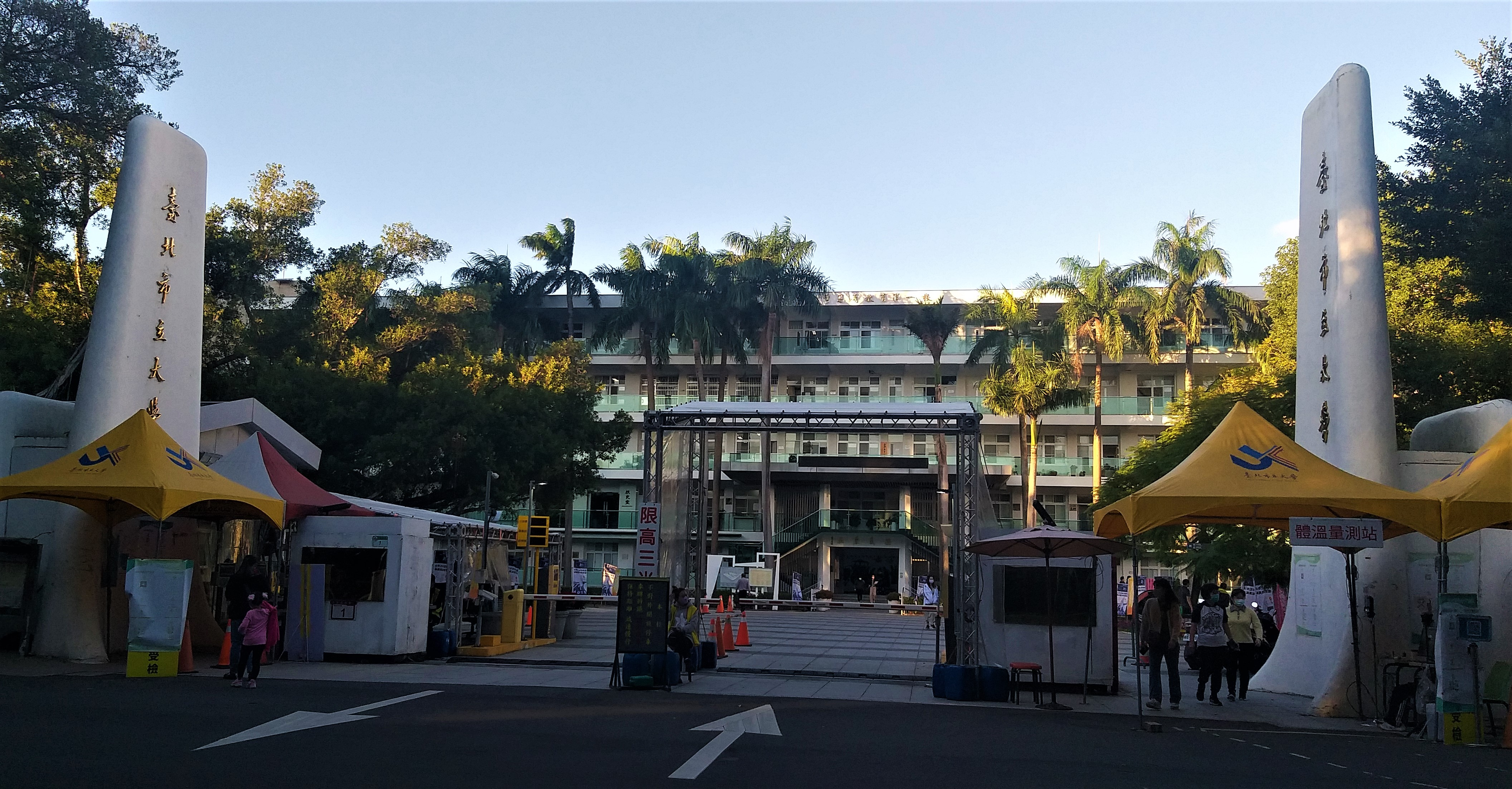
Bo'ai Campus main gate

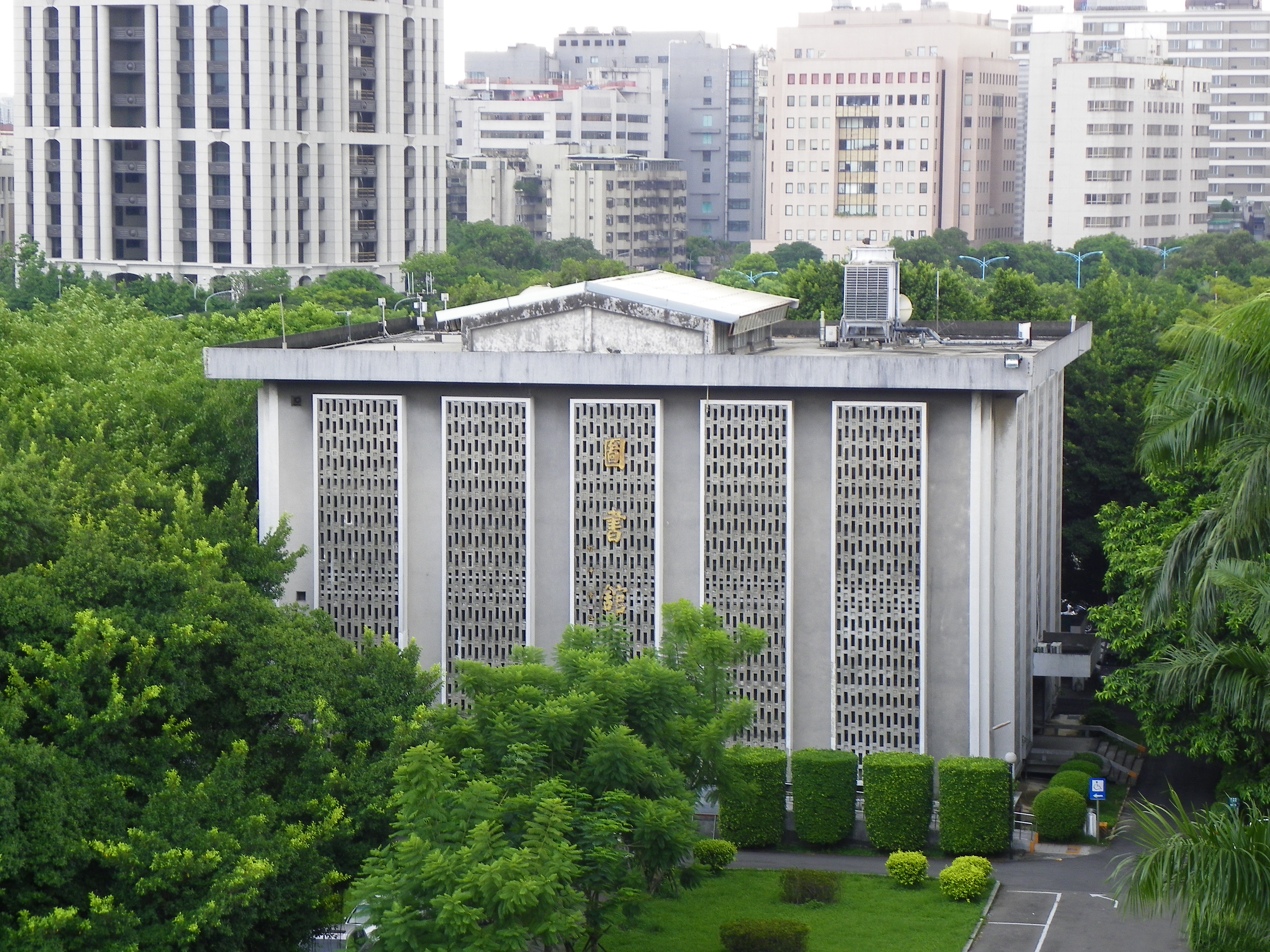
University of Taipei library

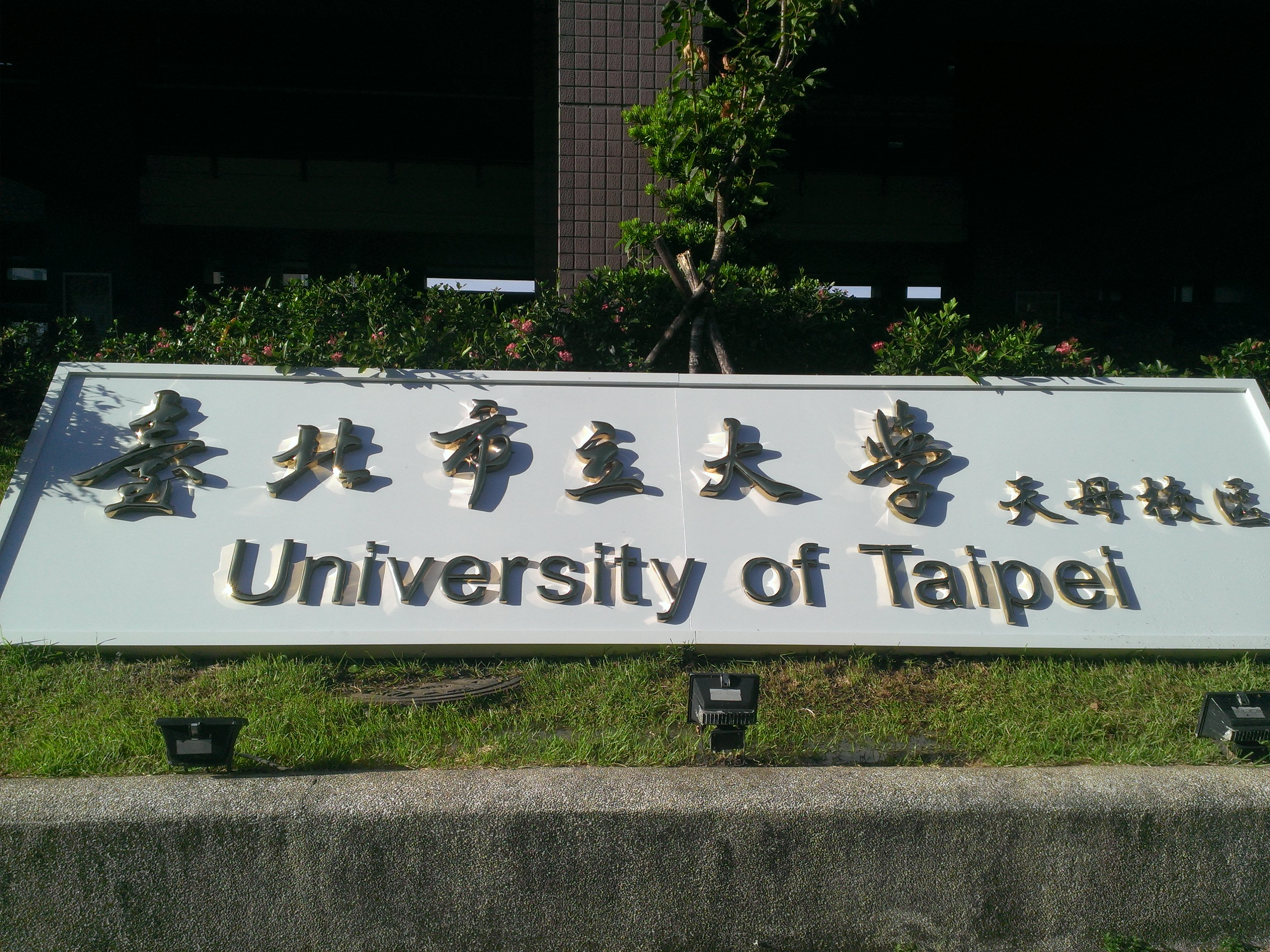
Campus in Tianmu, Shilin District, Taipei

Prior to the merger, TMUE had 4,800 students enrolled and TPEC had 2,700. Today about 7,500 students are enrolled in University of Taipei. The university currently consists of five colleges:

- College of Arts and Humanities
  - Department of Chinese Language and Literature
  - Department of Social and Public Affairs
  - Department of History and Geography
  - Department of Music
  - Department of Visual Arts
  - Department of English Instruction
  - Department of Dance
  - Master's Program in Teaching Chinese as a Second Language
  - Master's Program of Teaching of Social Studies
  - Research Center for Confucian Studies
  - Arts Center
  - Chinese Learning Center
- College of Education
  - Department of Education
  - Department of Psychology and Counseling
  - Department of Early Childhood Education
  - Department of Special Education
  - Department of Learning and Materials Design
  - Graduate School of Educational Administration and Evaluation
  - Master's Program of Speech and Language Pathology
- College of Science
  - Department and Graduate Institute of Physical Education
  - Department of Computer Science
  - Department of Applied Physics and Chemistry
  - Department of Mathematics
  - Department of Earth and Life Sciences
  - Master's Program E-Learning
  - Science Education Center
- College of Kinesiology
  - Department of Ball Sports
  - Department of Athletics
  - Department of Recreation and Sport Management
  - Department of Exercise and Health Sciences
  - Department of Aquatic Sports
  - Department of Martial Arts
  - Department of Sport Performing Arts
  - Graduate Institute of Sports Sciences
  - Graduate Institute of Sports Equipment Technology
  - Graduate Institute of Sport Pedagogy
  - Graduate Institute of Sports Training
  - Master's Program of Transition and Leisure Education for Individuals with Disabilities
- College of City Management
  - Department of Health and Welfare
  - Department of Urban Development
  - Department of Urban Industrial Management and Marketing

== Transportation ==
The Main Campus is accessible within walking distance West from Chiang Kai-shek Memorial Hall Station of the Taipei Metro. The Tianmu Campus is accessible within walking distance East from Zhishan Station of the Taipei Metro.

== Rankings ==
University rankings

Regional – Overall
- QS Asia: 751-800 (2025)

University of Taipei was not ranked by Times Higher Education, and it was ranked 601–650 in QS Asia University Rankings in 2024.

== See also ==
- List of universities in Taiwan
