= Vanung University =

Private university in Taoyuan City, Taiwan

Coordinates: 24°59′29.9″N 121°13′52.7″E

- 萬能科技大學
- Type: Private
- Established: 27 March 1972 (as Van Nung School of Industrial Skills); 1 February 2004 (as VNU)
- Location: Zhongli, Taoyuan City, Taiwan
- Website: www.vnu.edu.tw

Vanung University
- Traditional Chinese: 萬能科技大學
Transcriptions
Standard Mandarin
- Hanyu Pinyin: Wànnéng Kējì Dàxué
Southern Min
- Hokkien POJ: Bān-lêng Kho-ki Tāi-ha̍k

Vanung University (VNU; Chinese: 萬能科技大學; Pe̍h-ōe-jī: Bān-lêng Kho-ki Tāi-ha̍k) is a private university in Zhongli District, Taoyuan City, Taiwan.

Vanung University offers a wide range of academic programs, including undergraduate and graduate degree programs in fields such as business, engineering, design, humanities, and social sciences. The university has six colleges, including the College of Business, the College of Engineering, the College of Design, the College of Humanities, the College of Social Sciences, and the College of General Studies.

== History ==
VNU was originally established as Van Nung School of Industrial Skills on 27 March 1972. In 1973, it was renamed to Van Nung Institute of Industry. In 1990, it was again renamed Van Nung Institute of Industry and Commerce. In 1999, it was upgraded to Van Nung Institute of Technology. Finally on 1 February 2004, the institute was renamed Vanung University.

== Faculties ==
- College of Aviation and Engineering
- College of Design
- College of Tourism, Hospitality and Management

== See also ==
- List of universities in Taiwan
