= National Taiwan University of Science and Technology =

University in Taipei. Taiwan

- 國立臺灣科技大學
- Other names: NTUST; TaiwanTech (臺科大)
- Former name: National Taiwan Institute of Technology
- Motto: 精誠 (Pe̍h-ōe-jī: Cheng-sêng)
- Motto in English: Precision in work, sincerity in attitude
- Type: Public research institute of technology
- Established: August 1, 1974; 51 years ago
- Affiliations: National Taiwan University System; Global Research & Industry Alliance; EQUIS; AACSB; UAiTED
- Budget: NT$2.8 billion
- President: Yen Jia-Yush (顏家鈺; Pe̍h-ōe-jī: Gân Ka-gio̍k)
- Academic staff: 515 (full-time)
- Administrative staff: 318
- Students: 11,672
- Undergraduates: 5,593
- Postgraduates: 6,079
- Location: Daan, Taipei, Taiwan; 25.013686°N 121.540535°E
- Campus: Urban
- Language: Chinese
- Colors: Blue
- Mascots: Benjamin (老虎坂守), Rossie (鴨子蘿絲)
- Website: www.ntust.edu.tw

Chinese name
- Simplified Chinese: 国立台湾科技大学
- Traditional Chinese: 國立臺灣科技大學
Transcriptions
Standard Mandarin
- Hanyu Pinyin: Guólì Táiwān Kējì Dàxué
- Bopomofo: ㄍㄨㄛ ㄌㄧˋ ㄊㄞˊ ㄨㄢ ㄎㄜ ㄐㄧˋ ㄉㄚˋ ㄒㄩㄝˊ
- Wade–Giles: kuo^{2}li^{4} t'ai^{2}wan k'êchi^{4} ta^{4}hsüeh2
- Tongyong Pinyin: Guólì táiwan kejì dàsyué
- Yale Romanization: Gwólì táiwān kējì dàsywé
- MPS2: Guólì táiwān kējì dàshiué
Southern Min
- Hokkien POJ: Kok-li̍p Tâi-oân Kho-ki Tāi-ha̍k

The National Taiwan University of Science and Technology (NTUST), also known as TaiwanTech, is a public research university in Taipei, Taiwan. Established in 1974, it was originally a vocational college dedicated to science, technology, engineering, and mathematics.

The university has five campuses, with its main campus in Gongguan covering an area of approximately 10 hectares (25 acres). As of 2023, it has more than 5,000 undergraduates and 6,000 graduate students. Its seven academic colleges host 14 departments and 24 graduate programs.

NTUST, in partnership with National Taiwan University and National Taiwan Normal University, form the National Taiwan University System. In addition, the number of international master's and doctoral students at NTUST is the largest in Taiwan.

== History ==
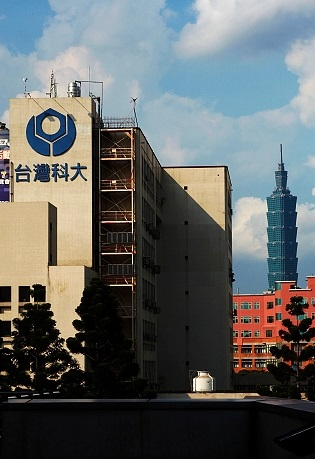
Taiwan Tech and Taipei 101

National Taiwan University of Science and Technology, formerly known as National Taiwan Institute of Technology, was established on 22 July 1974, as the first and the best higher education institution of its kind within the technological and vocational education system in Taiwan. By extending this system to the highest level, the university was intended to meet the need created by the rapid economic and industrial development for highly trained engineers and managers.

The university initially consisted of four departments, Industrial Management, Electronic Engineering, Mechanical Engineering, and Textile Engineering, in 1974. The department of Construction Engineering was added in 1975; and both the department of Chemical Engineering and Electrical Engineering were launched in 1976. The Master's degree programs began in 1979, and the Ph.D. programs were offered in 1982. On attaining university status in 1997, the university reorganized itself into five colleges － Engineering, Electrical and Computer Engineering, Management, Design, and Liberal Arts and Social Sciences. From the year 2001, certain departments also began to accept students into doctoral programs in the continuing education division.

After more than thirty years of growth and evolution, under the outstanding leadership of successive presidents, nowadays, the Taiwan Tech has become one of the 11 top universities in Taiwan, and has been recognized by all sectors of society for its academic and practical achievements in such areas as cooperation with industry, promotion of entrepreneurship and technology licensing. The university is considered the best technical university in Taiwan. The achievements made by the university in the technical and design departments has made it well recognized among the Asian universities as well.

In 2018, NTUST established the Polytechnic University Taiwan - Paraguay (UPTP) in Asunción, the capital of Paraguay, with NTUST providing teaching assistance. NTUST started the groundbreaking for the extension of Taiwan Tech's new Hsinchu Campus in 2020, four years after the university had decided to open a new branch campus in Hsinchu. In 2023, Hwa Hsia University of Technology (HHUT) merged into NTUST to form the NTUST Hwa Hsia Campus in Zhonghe District, New Taipei City. This marked Taiwan's first merger between a public and a private university.

== Presidents ==
- Presidents of National Taiwan Institute of Technology
1. Chen Lu-an: August 1974 － January 1978
2. Mao Gao-wen : February 1978 － July 1981
3. Shih Yen-ping : August 1981 － July 1990
4. Liou Ching-tien : August 1990 － July 1997
- Presidents of National Taiwan University of Science and Technology
1. Liou Ching-tien : August 1997 － July 2000
2. Chen Shi-shuenn (acting) : August 2000 － December 2000
3. Chen Shun-tyan : December 2000 － January 2005
4. Chen Shi-shuenn : February 2005 － January 2013
5. Liao Chin-jong : February 2013 － January 2021
6. Yen Jia-Yush : February 2021 － present

== Campus ==
=== Main campus ===
The university has five campuses; the main campus, Gongguan Campus, is in the Daan District of Taipei City, and contains most teaching and researching buildings, library, athletic facilities, and the central administrative offices.

The Gongguan Campus, located at 43 Keelung Rd, Sec. 4, situated in southern Taipei, covers an area of about 10 hectares. It is about a 10-minute walk away from the Gongguan MRT (Mass Rapid Transit) Station.

=== Other campuses ===
The other four campuses are:

- Tucheng Campus. Located in Tucheng District, New Taipei City. Approximately 5.7 hectares.
- Keelung Campus. Located in Keelung. Approximately 10 hectares.
- New Gongguan Campus. Located in the Daan District of Taipei City, near the main campus. Approximately 2.3 hectares.
- Zhubei Campus. Located in Zhubei, Hsinchu County. Approximately 20.33 hectares.
- Hwa Hsia Campus. Located in Zhonghe, New Taipei City. Approximately 9 hectares.

== Academics ==
=== Degrees ===
Taiwan Tech's undergraduate division has two-year, four-year and continuing education programs. The two-year upper division program accepts graduates of technical junior colleges, while the four-year program seeks applicants from general and technical senior high schools. Continuing education programs are offered in the evenings by the Departments of Industrial Management, Electronic Engineering, Mechanical Engineering, Construction Engineering, and Applied Foreign Languages to those who are currently employed. Students who successfully complete the requirements in any of these three undergraduate programs are awarded a bachelor's degree.

The Master's degree programs began accepting students in 1979. Those with a bachelor's degree or its equivalent in related fields from schools here or abroad are eligible to take the entrance exam. In addition, to encourage those already long in the workforce to advance their education, certain departments in the university also offer continuing education Master's programs in the evening. Students in these graduate programs who have successfully completed all the requirements, including a thesis and defense, are awarded a Master's degree.

The doctoral programs seek for holders of a Master's degree or its equivalent from schools here or abroad. From the year 2001, certain departments also began to accept students into doctoral programs in the continuing education division. Students in any of these doctoral programs, who have successfully completed all the requirements, including a thesis and defense, are awarded the doctorate.

=== Colleges and departments ===
Taiwan Tech's 14 departments and 24 graduate programs are organized into 7 colleges:

- College of Engineering
  - Graduate Institute of Automation and Control
  - Department of Mechanical Engineering
  - Department of Materials Science and Engineering
  - Department of Construction Engineering
  - Department of Chemical Engineering
- College of Electrical Engineering and Computer Science
  - Department of Electronic Engineering
  - Department of Electrical Engineering
  - Department of Computer Science and Information Engineering
  - Graduate Institute of Electro-Optical Engineering
- School of Management
  - Graduate Institute of Management
  - Graduate Institute of Technology Management
  - EDBA/EMBA
  - Department of Industrial Management
  - Department of Business Administration
  - Graduate Institute of Finance
  - Department of Information Management
  - MBA
  - Graduate Institute of Technology Management
  - Management Undergraduate Honors Program
- College of Design
  - Graduate Institute of Design
  - Department of Architecture
  - Department of Industrial and Commercial Design
- College of Liberal Arts and Social Sciences
  - Graduate Institute of Digital Learning and Education
  - Department of Applied Foreign Languages
  - Department of Humanities and Social Sciences
  - Teacher Education Center
- College of Applied Sciences
  - Graduate Institute of Applied Science and Technology
  - Graduate Institute of Biomedical Engineering
  - Graduate Institute of Color and Illumination Technology
  - Jing Cheng Department (University Inter-discipline Department)
- College of Intellectual Property Studies
  - Graduate Institute of Patent

=== Student body ===
Taiwan Tech has a total enrollment of 10,389 students, of which 5,645 are at the undergraduate and 4,744 at the graduate and professional levels in 2013. Taiwan Tech awarded 1,285 undergraduate degrees, 1,387 Master's degrees, and 117 doctoral degrees in 2009.

In the 2005–2006 school year, NTUST admitted four foreign students into a new English-based program in the Mechanical Engineering Department. Since then, Taiwan Tech's student body has grown to encompass 720 international students in 2013, representing over 45 counties. The numbers of students from Indonesia, Vietnam, India and Latin America are already large enough to form their own student associations. Indonesian students are the most populated among them.

=== Libraries and digital resources ===
Opened in March 1975, the Taiwan Tech library has an unbroken history of offering services for academic research and teaching resources. The library, with 5,132 square meters of floor space and about 630 seats in its reading facilities, encompasses two sections: acquisition and cataloguing section and periodical and circulation section.

The Taiwan Tech Library hold a collection of 240, 959 volumes of books, 2,933 titles of periodicals, 540,000 pieces of ERIC microfiches, and 180 titles of online databases. The full-text e-journal systems such as ABI/INFORM IEL, IEEE, ASP, SDOS services are also available.

In addition, the library offers automated circulation, reference services, reserved book services, interlibrary loan services, audio-visual lab services, and library orientation services. The library has also been interconnected with the NTUST network to ensure ease in library facilities like issuing books and downloading audio and video e-books.Rankings and achievements

== Rankings ==
University rankings

Global – Overall
- ARWU World: 701-800 (2024)
- QS World: =345 (2026)
- THE World: 401-500 (2024)
- USNWR Global: 891 (2025)

Regional – Overall
- QS Asia: 74 (2024)
- THE Asia: 71 (2024)

=== Global rankings ===
Nation Taiwan University of Science and Technology (Taiwan Tech) is ranked 392 among world universities in the QS World University Rankings 2025. The School of Management of Taiwan Tech is ranked 5th (Excellent Level) among the universities in Taiwan by eduniversal.com 2009.

Taiwan Tech is ranked 74 among Asian universities in the QS World University Rankings 2024. It was also ranked as Asia's 10th best institute in science and technology in 1999 by Asiaweek.

A total of 702 research papers by Taiwan Tech faculty were published in both SCI and SSCI journals in 2009, subject ranked top 300 in the world and 7th in Taiwan nationally.

=== Taiwan's domestic rankings ===
Taiwan Tech is one of 11 top universities in Taiwan sponsored by the Taiwan Ministry of Education's (MOE) "Building Top Universities and Elite Research Centers Development Plan". Taiwan Tech is ranked as the best technical university in Taiwan, 4th in the Industry-University Cooperative Research Awards, and most graduate programs are ranked top 5th to 6th among national universities by the MOE".

Taiwan Tech is one of the top five Best Technology Licensing Centers declared by the National Science Council (NSC), 3rd in overall amount of NSC Technology Licensing funding, and 1st in the Technology Licensing individually allocated founding by the NSC. From 1994 to date, a total of 33 faculties received the Distinguished Research Awards from the NSC, ranked 6th in Taiwan. The university was the only university awarded the National Invention and Creation Award by the Ministry of Economic Affairs in 2007.

The university is ranked 6th most favorite university of the enterprises in Taiwan, 1st among the technical education system, according to the survey by 104 Job Bank and Global Views Monthly Magazine. Taiwan Tech's graduates are chosen by Cheer's Magazine as among the industry's top six most-preferred students.

== Research centers and institutes ==
The research and development activities of Taiwan Tech are focused on research in basic science and applied science, as well as university-industry and international cooperation. Large-scale projects are conducted in building engineering, chemistry, computer engineering, electronics, information technology, and materials technology. They are facilitated by an inter-departmental and interdisciplinary approach, and thus enhance both academic research and teaching.

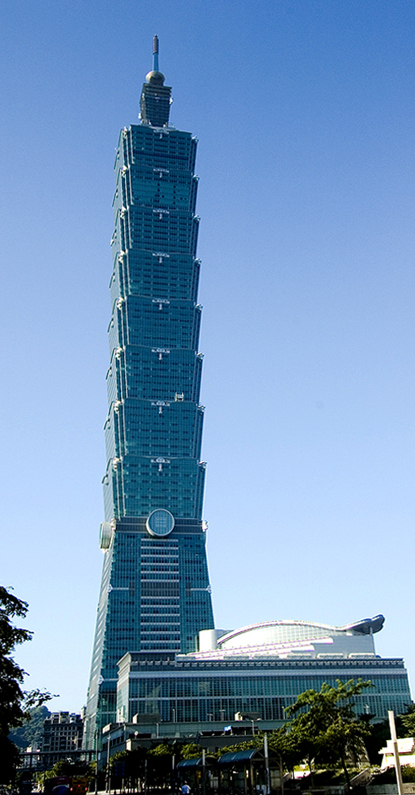
Taipei 101. Earthquake Resistant Beam-to-Column Connection for Steel Structure Application.

Currently, there are over 20 specialized research centers including:

- Taiwan Information Security Center
- The Commatrix (Advanced Design Center)
- Opto-Mechatronics Technology Center
- Communications & Electromagnetic Technology Center
- Power Electronics Technology Center
- Intelligent Robot Center
- Ecological and Hazard Mitigation Engineering Research Center
- Nanotechnology Engineering Center
- Science and Technology Materials Center
- Automation and Control Center
- Center for Research in Technological and Vocational Education
- Innovation and Creativity Center
- Scientific Instrument Center
- Center for the Study of Lotteries and Commercial Gaming
- Construction Occupational Health & Safety Center
- Facilities and Assets Management Center for Infrastructure
- Building Energy Conservation Center
- Building Hazard Mitigation Technology Center
- Intelligent Building Center
- Green Materials Center
- Open Architecture Center
- Computer Vision and Medical Imaging Center

In addition, the Office of Research and Development, including the university-Industry Cooperation Center, the Business Incubation Center, and the Technology Transfer Center (TTC), has been established to link research results with the needs of industry for development and applications.

=== Taiwan Building Technology Center ===
Among the universities chosen to receive a grant under the Ministry of Education's Building Top Universities and Elite Research Centers Development Plan, NTUST was the only one to propose establishing a new research center which focuses on building-related issues. The Taiwan Building Technology Center (TBTC) seeks to integrate the humanities, the arts, and science and technology to enhance the positive impact that buildings can have on the safety and quality of people's lives.

The TBTC has gathered outstanding researchers from Taiwan and abroad to pursue this goal through six research teams: the Intelligent Buildings Research Group, Building Structure and Hazard Mitigation Center, Green Building Materials Center, New Generation Building System Center, Steel Structure Engineering Center, and Building Energy Efficiency and Renewable Energy Center. These two groups focus on key technologies affecting buildings at each stage of their life-cycles. At the same time, the two groups also work on new building and ICT technologies that can create energy-conserving buildings with a reduced carbon footprint. In addition, the new TBTC building, currently under construction, will provide a real-world laboratory for testing and exhibiting the ideas and results of the center's projects, thus assisting the TBTC in taking its place on the world stage as a leading research center for intelligent green building technology.

=== EU-FP National Contact Point-Taiwan Office ===
The National Contact Point-Taiwan Office (NCP-Taiwan), established in Sep. of 2008, seeks to facilitate the engagement of Taiwanese universities, industry, research institutes and their researchers with the European Union's Seventh Framework Programme (FP7) and other related EU opportunities for mutual collaboration between the European Union and Taiwan. The aim of NCP-Taiwan is to increase the quality, quantity, profile and impact of Taiwan-EU research cooperation under FP7 by developing and executing a suite of activities such as info-days, seminars, exchange visits, technical assistance, workshops and other activities designed to increase the awareness of, and involvement in, new collaborative opportunities.

=== Research and Development Office ===
The Research and Development Office was established as a bridge between the university itself and government organizations and enterprises, with the aim of strengthening cooperative relationships. The office has three centers including the university-Industry Cooperation Center, the Business Incubation Center, and the Technology Transfer Center.

The aim of the university–Industry Cooperation Center is to facilitate interactions between Taiwan Tech and enterprises; to promote and share Taiwan Tech's research achievements and drive for success with industry, and, most importantly, to synchronize Taiwan Tech's research efforts with industry trends so as to reduce industry's development cycle and to increase its research capacity effectively.

The Business Incubation Center seeks to integrate innovation technology, and to incubate enterprises for developing new products, businesses and technologies. Key functions have included creating the conditions for a space/satellite cluster, providing consultation in regard to business plans and the establishment of companies or factories, as well as supporting the development and registration of technology applications, providing business management and training programs, assisting with government funding applications, and helping with the development of publicity campaigns.

The Technology Transfer Center's main objective is to fully develop the potential value of Taiwan Tech's research achievements through effective technological marketing, and, by continuous interaction with industry, to promote competitiveness and technology development.

== International cooperation ==
Taiwan Tech is actively engaged in various kinds of exchange programs, bringing students from abroad to take courses or engage in research work on the campus. On the faculty and administrative level, Taiwan Tech welcomes a large number of international scholars each year, including for long or short term faculty appointments, international conferences, seminars or lectures, research projects, or just to discuss establishing a cooperative relationship with their home institutions, thus adding to the list of 181 academic institutions on five continents throughout the world with which the university has signed such agreements.

== Alumni ==
To date, a total of 56,511 students have graduated from the university's undergraduate and graduate programs, of which 40,287 were at the undergraduate, 15,140 were at the Master's program, and 1,084 were at the Ph.D. program. The majority of the alumni have devoted themselves to the various aspects of Taiwan's economic development, to which many of them are making important contributions.

== Gallery ==
Taiwan Tech landscapes

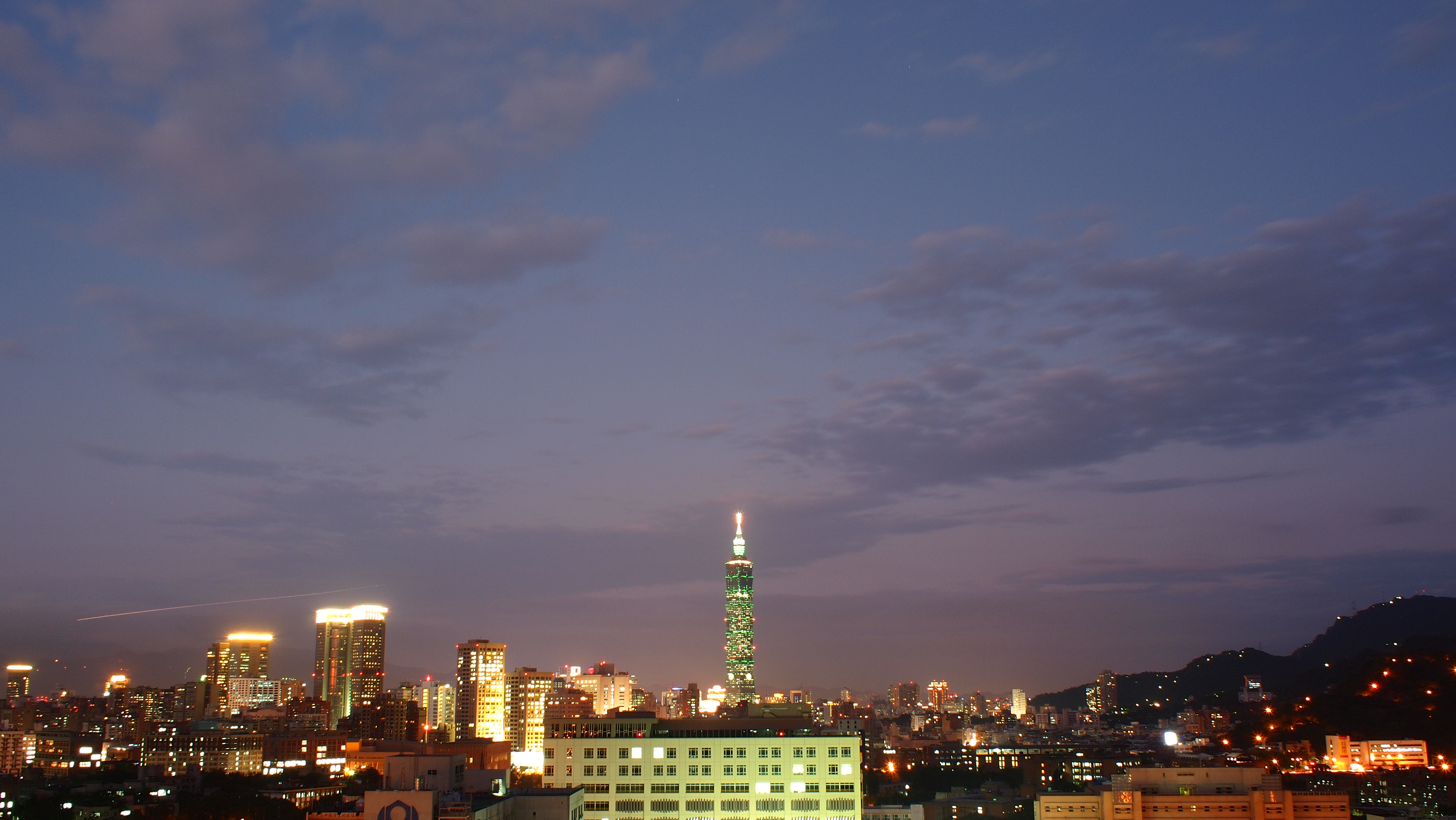

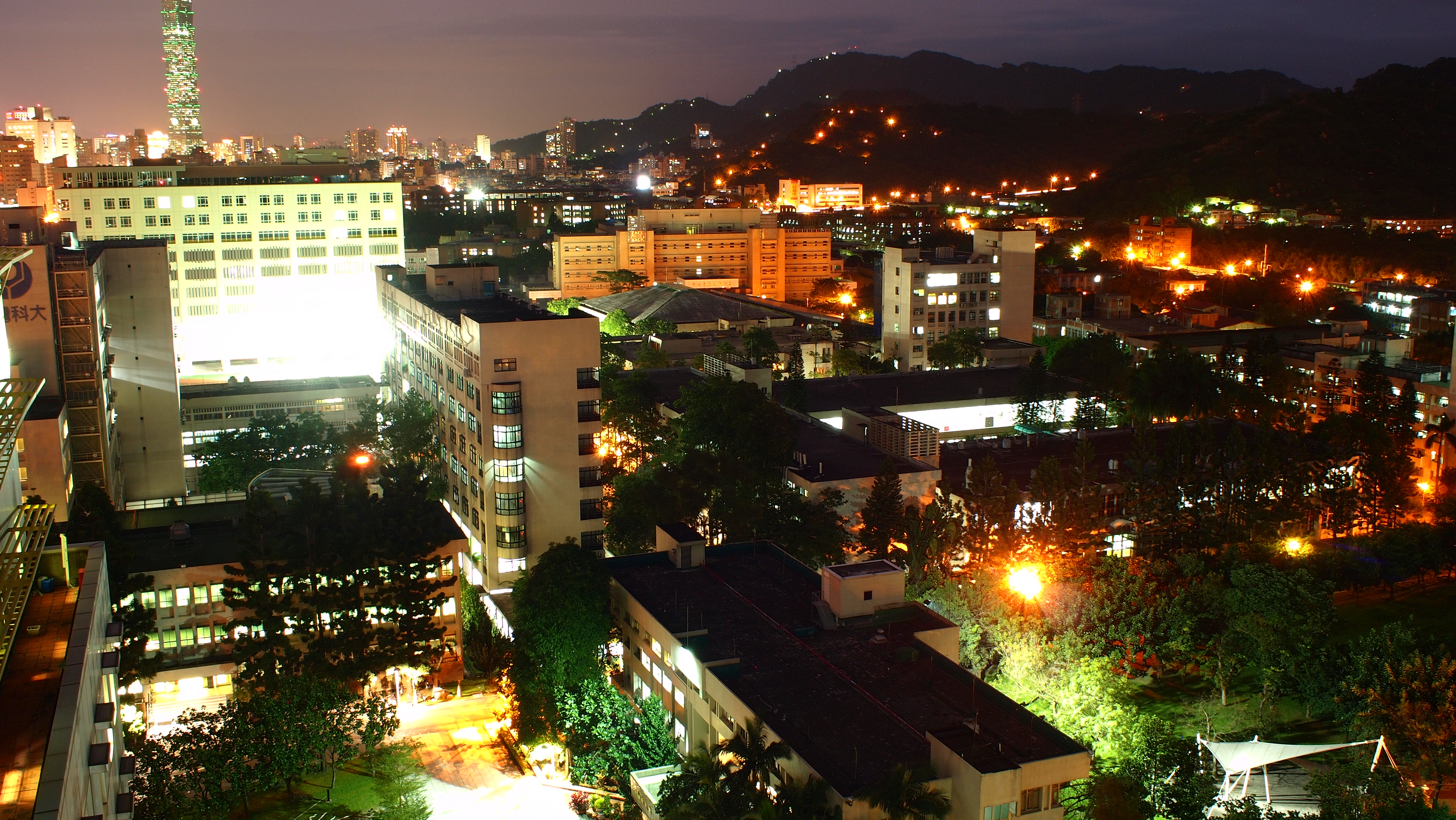

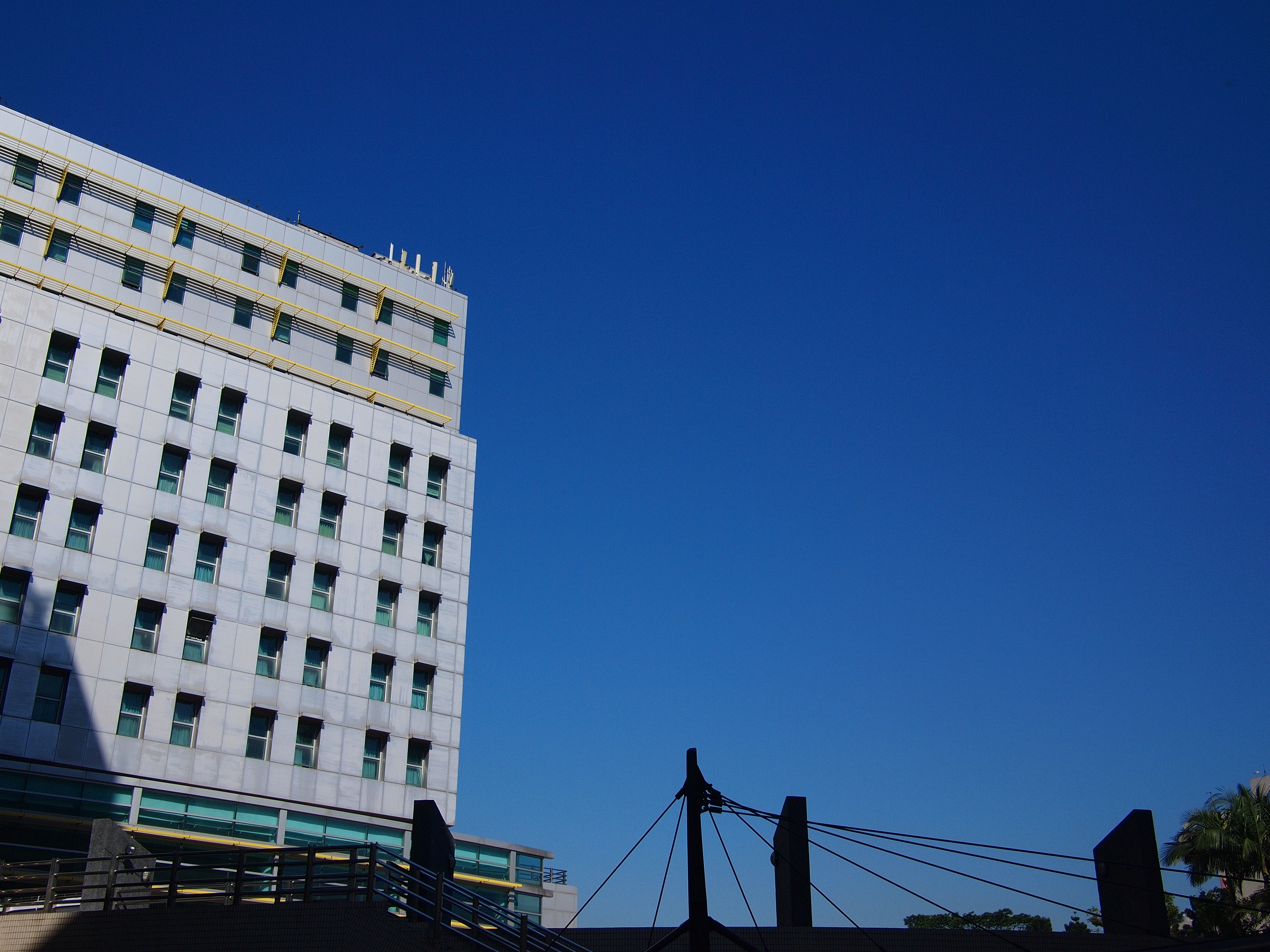

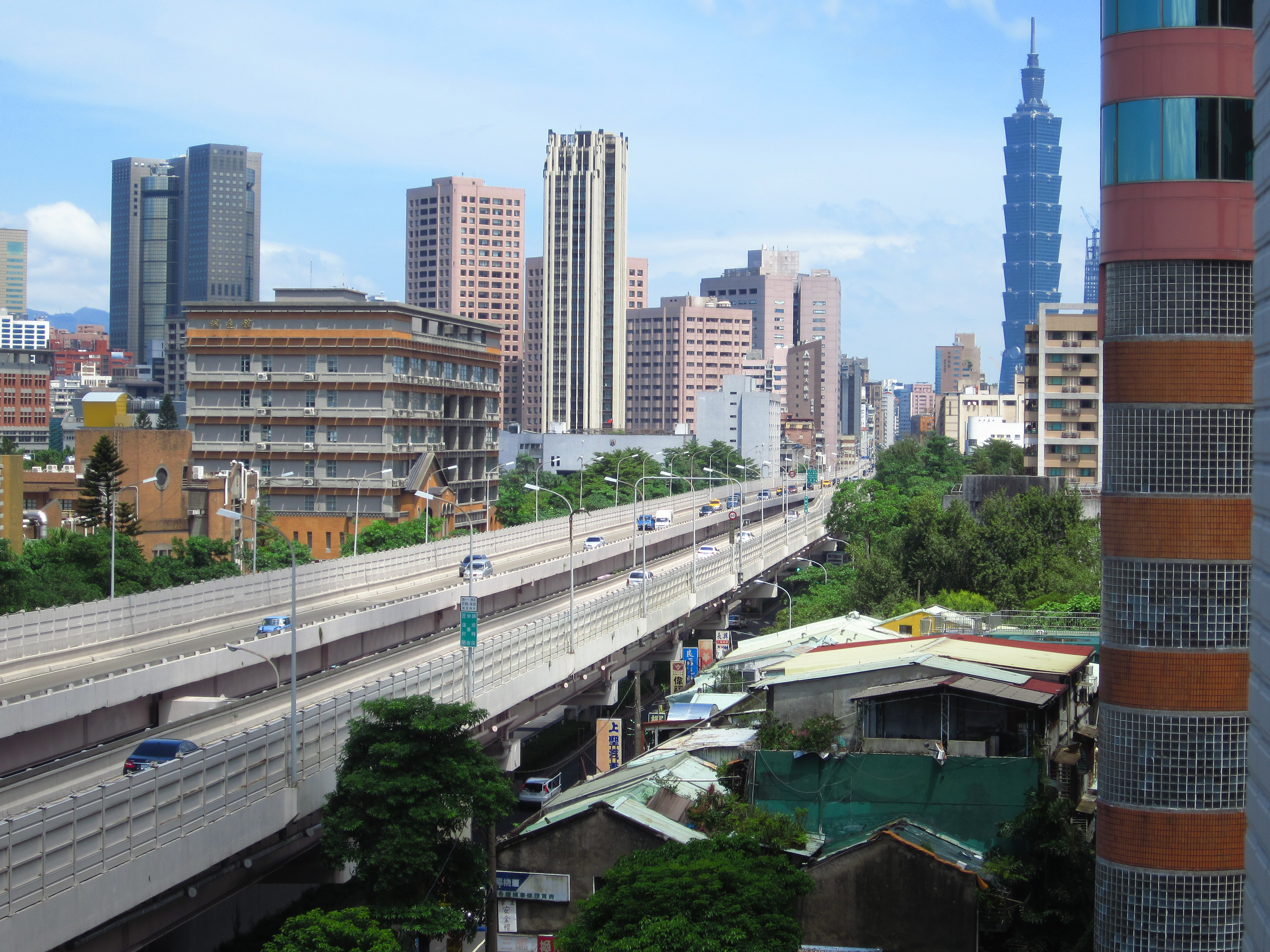

== See also ==
- Digital library
- List of universities in Taiwan
