= Overseas Chinese University =

University in Xitun, Taichung, Taiwan

- 僑光科技大學 (Chinese)
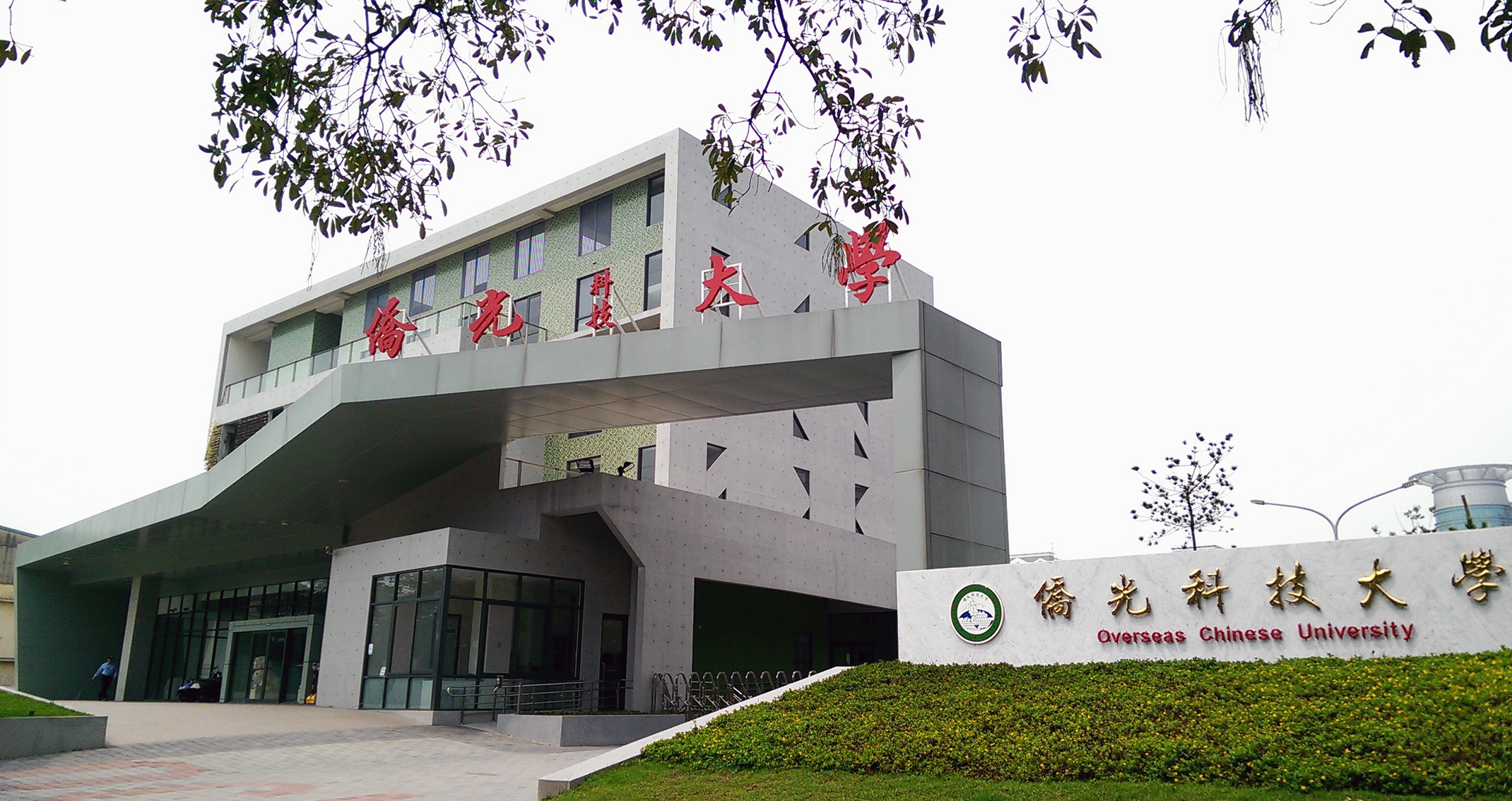
- Type: Private university
- Established: 1964
- Location: Xitun, Taichung, Taiwan; 24°11′21.7″N 120°38′38.6″E
- Website: Official website

Chinese name
- Simplified Chinese: 侨光科技大学
- Traditional Chinese: 僑光科技大學
Transcriptions
Standard Mandarin
- Hanyu Pinyin: Qiáoguāng Kējì Dàxué
Southern Min
- Hokkien POJ: Kiâu-kong Kho-ki Tāi-ha̍k

Overseas Chinese University (OCU; Chinese: 僑光科技大學) is a private university in Xitun District, Taichung, Taiwan. It was founded in 1964 by the Hsin Tien Kong Educational Foundation, and was originally called the Overseas Chinese Junior College.

OCU offers a range of undergraduate and graduate programs in various fields, including management, computer science, engineering, design, law, and health sciences.

== History ==
OCU was founded in 1964.

== Academic Units ==
- School of Business and Management
- School of Information Technology and Design
- School of Tourism and Hospitality

== Faculty ==
OCU faculty members are made up of 350 instructors and professors in total. Among them, 240 are full-time.

== Students ==
OCU enrolled about 10,000 students.

== See also ==
- List of universities in Taiwan
