= National Taiwan Sport University =

Public University in Taiwan

Coordinates: 25°01′55.3″N 121°23′12.0″E

- 國立體育大學
- Motto: 精誠樸毅
- Motto in English: Precision, Honesty, Frugality and Perseverance
- Type: Public
- Established: 1987; 39 years ago
- Principal: Chiu Ping-kun
- Students: 2,742 (2020 academic year)
- Location: Guishan District, Taoyuan, Taiwan
- Website: www.ntsu.edu.tw

National Taiwan Sport University
- Simplified Chinese: 国立体育大学
- Traditional Chinese: 國立體育大學
Transcriptions
Standard Mandarin
- Hanyu Pinyin: Guólì Tǐyù Dàxué

The National Taiwan Sport University (NTSU; Chinese: 國立體育大學) is a public university specializing in sports in Taoyuan, Taiwan.

NTSU offers a variety of undergraduate and graduate programs, including bachelor's and master's degrees in fields such as sports science, physical education, leisure and recreation management, sports coaching, athletic training, and sports medicine. The university also offers doctoral programs in sports science and physical education.

== History ==
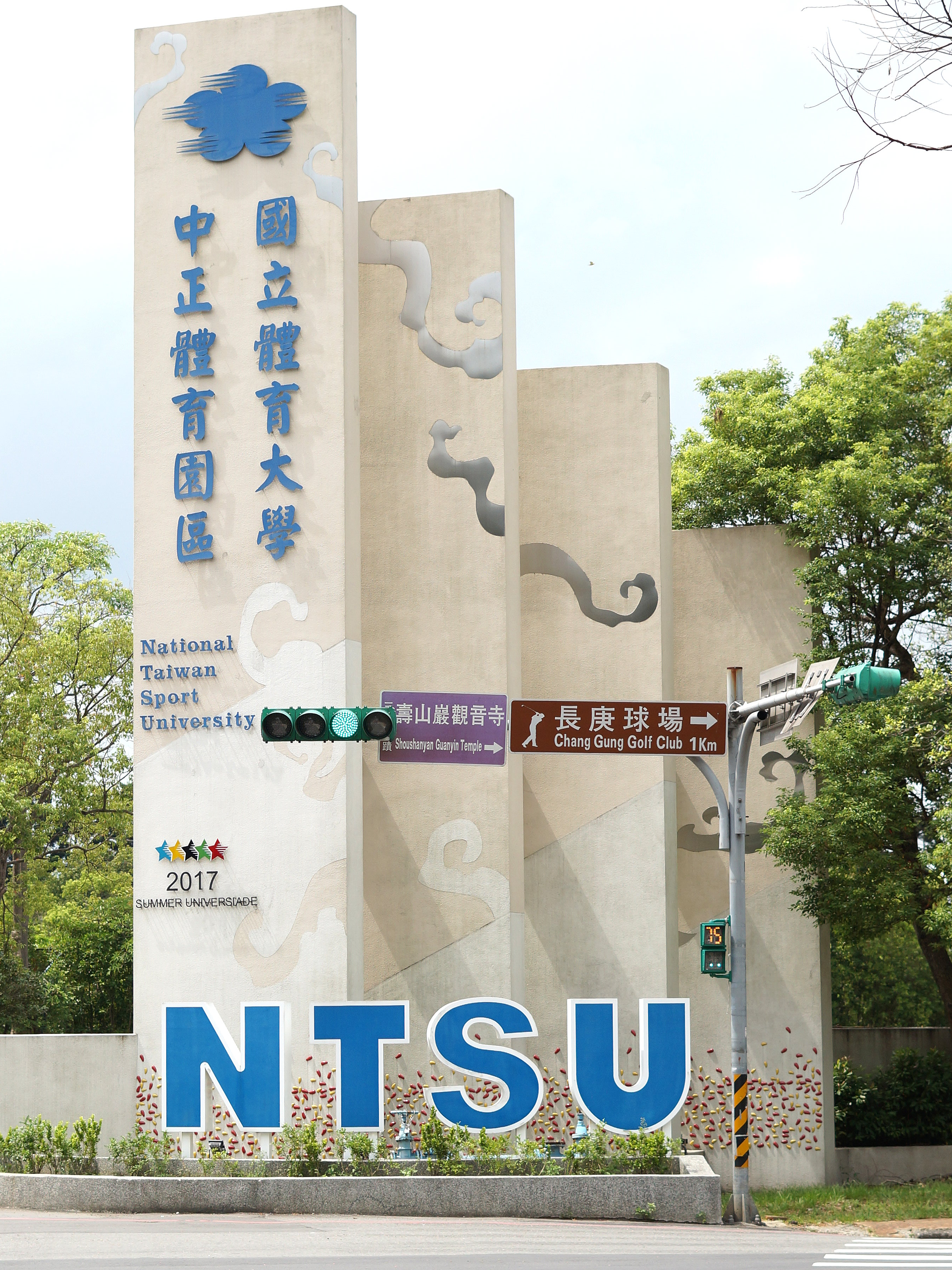
NTSU main gate

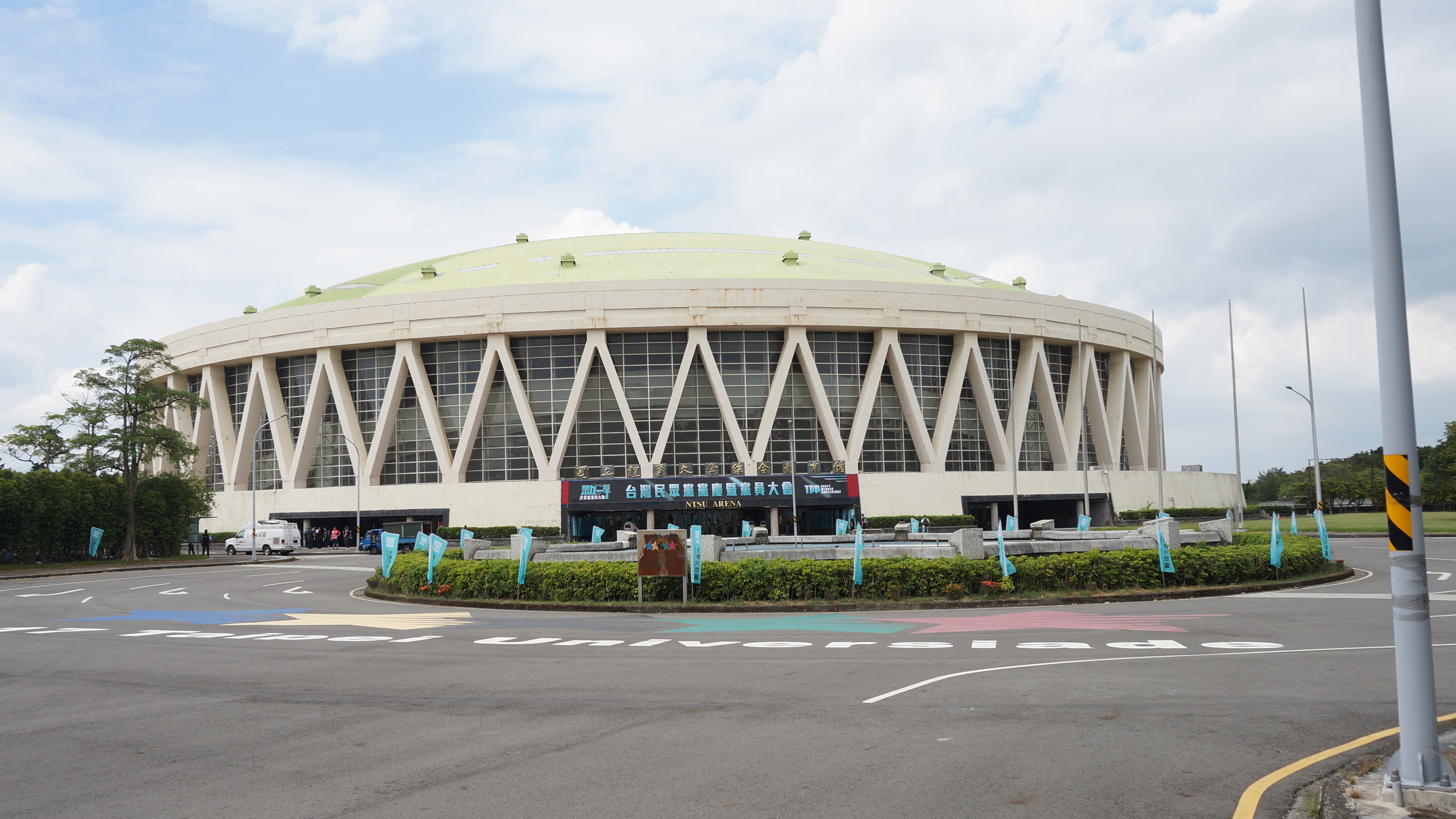
NTSU Arena

NTSU was originally established as National College of Physical Education and Sports on 1 July 1987. On 1 February 2008, the college was renamed to National Taiwan Sport University.

== Academics ==
NTSU has four colleges:

College of Athletics	Department	Bachelor	Master	PhD
College of Athletics	Dept. of Sports Training Science – Combats	✔		
College of Athletics	Dept. of Sports Training Science – Balls	✔		
College of Athletics	Dept. of Sports Training Science – Athletics	✔		
College of Athletics	Graduate Institute of Athletics and Coaching Science		✔	✔
College of Athletics	MSc & MPhE dual degrees programme in International Sports; Coaching Science		✔	
College of Physical Education	Dept. of Sport Promotion	✔	✔	
College of Physical Education	Dept. of Adapted Physical Education	✔	✔	
College of Physical Education	Graduate Institute of Physical Education		✔	✔
College of Exercise and Health Sciences	Dept. of Athletic Training and Health	✔		
College of Exercise and Health Sciences	Graduate Institute of Sport Science		✔	✔
College of Management	Dept. of Recreation and Leisure Industry Management	✔	✔	
College of Management	Graduate Institute of International Sport Affairs		✔	
College of Management	Doctoral Program for Transnational Sport Management and Innovation			✔

== Notable alumni ==
- Chen Kuei-ru, athlete

== Transportation ==
The university is accessible within walking distance south of National Taiwan Sport University Station of Taoyuan Metro.

== See also ==
- NTSU Arena
- List of universities in Taiwan
