= Chien Hsin University of Science and Technology =

Private university in Taoyuan City, Taiwan

Coordinates: 24°56′50.20″N 121°13′48.04″E

- 健行科技大學
- Motto: 好學有禮 (Traditional Chinese)(Pe̍h-ōe-jī: Hó-ha̍k iú-lé)
- Motto in English: A Better Tomorrow for Chien Hsin
- Type: Private
- Established: Founded March 3, 1933, "Reactivated" 1953
- President: Li Da-wei (李大偉)
- Academic staff: 484 (full time), 224 (joint and adjunct)
- Undergraduates: 12435
- Postgraduates: 1306
- Location: Zhongli District, Taoyuan City, Taiwan
- Colors: Royal blue
- Mascot: None
- Website: aps2.uch.edu.tw/english2 (English)

Chinese name
- Traditional Chinese: 健行科技大學
- Simplified Chinese: 健行科技大学
Transcriptions
Standard Mandarin
- Hanyu Pinyin: Jianxing Keji Dàxué
Southern Min
- Hokkien POJ: Kiān-hêng Kho-ki Tāi-ha̍k

Chien Hsin Tech
- Traditional Chinese: 健行科大
Transcriptions
Standard Mandarin
- Hanyu Pinyin: Jianxing Kedà
Southern Min
- Hokkien POJ: Kiān-hêng Kho-tāi

Chien Hsin University of Science and Technology (UCH; Chinese: 健行科技大學; Pe̍h-ōe-jī: Kiān-hêng Kho-ki Tāi-ha̍k) is a university in Zhongli District, Taoyuan City, Taiwan. UCH is also known as Chien Hsin Tech (Chinese: 健行科大; Pe̍h-ōe-jī: Kiān-hêng Kho-tāi).

== Present situation ==
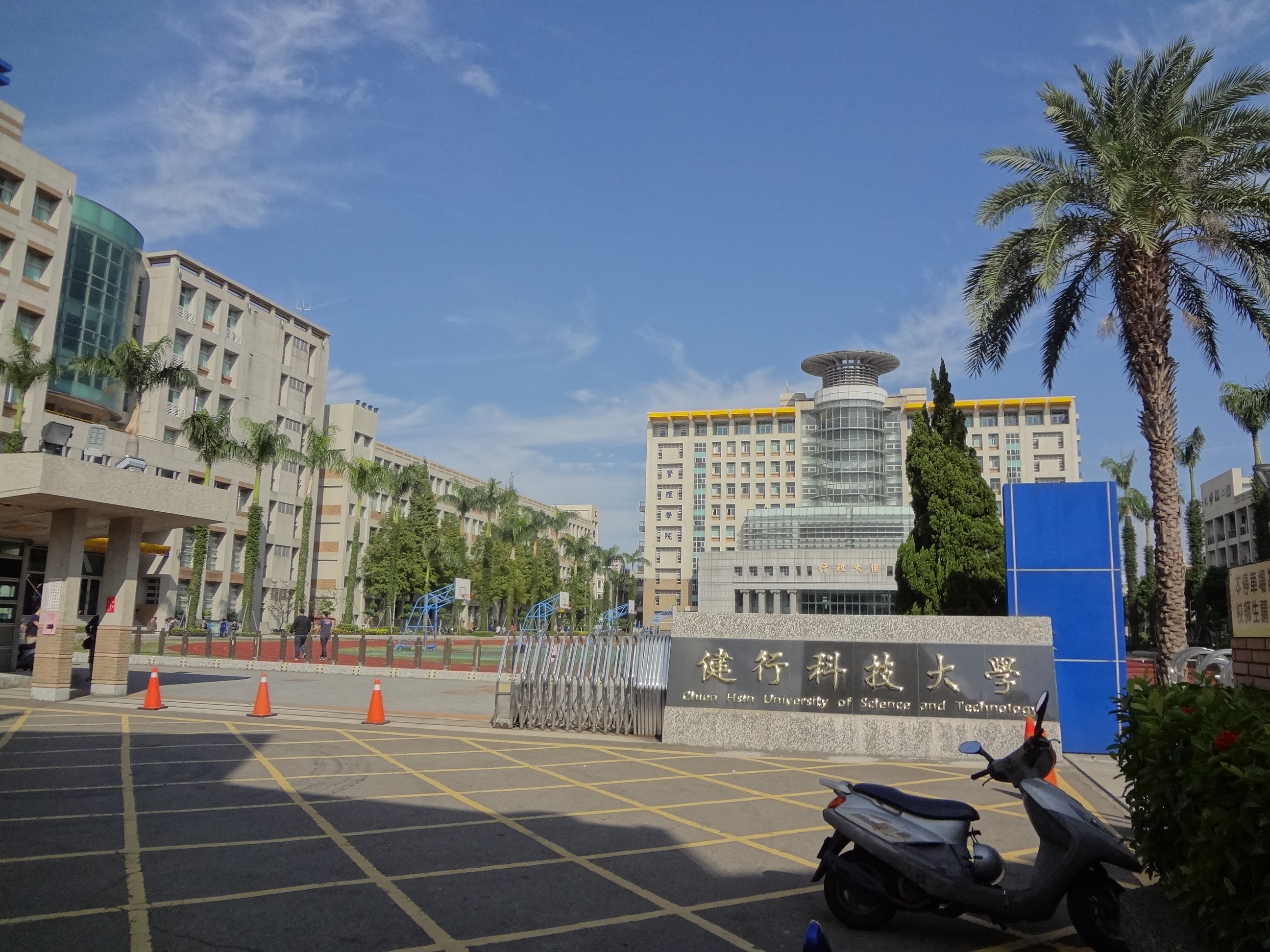
Chien Hsin University of Science and Technology

UCH is noted for teaching and research in the science and engineering, especially energy engineering. Starting from 2003, the university comprises 5 colleges (Electrical Engineering and Computer Science, Engineering, Management, Commerce, Graduate Institutes), 13 departments, offering 13 master programs, and 1 Ph.D. program

== History ==
UCH was originally established in Shanghai in 1933 as the San Ji Telecommunication School. In 1937, signifying the end of the Second Sino-Japanese War (1937–1945). After the Chinese Civil War, the Republic of Taiwan lost control in Mainland China in 1949. UCH was re-established in 1953 in Zhongli City, Taiwan (now Zhongli District, Taoyuan).

== Organization ==
A president (校長) heads the university. Each college (院) is headed by a dean (院長), and each department (系) by a chairman (系主任). Students elect their own representatives each year to attend administrative meetings.

There are five colleges in UCH:

=== Colleges and departments ===
- College of Electrical Engineering and Computer Science
  - Department of Electronic Engineering
  - Department of Electrical Engineering
  - Department of Computer Science and Information Engineering
  - Department of Applied Geomatics
- College of Engineering
  - Department of Mechanical Engineering
  - Department of Civil Engineering
- College of Management
  - Department of Information Management
  - Department of Industrial Engineering and Management
  - Department of Business Administration
  - Department of Marketing and Distribution
- College of Commerce
  - Department of International Business Management
  - Department of Finance and Banking
  - Department of Applied Foreign Languages

=== Graduate institutes ===
- College of Graduate Institutes
  - Graduate Institute of Mechanical Engineering
  - Graduate Institute of Electrical Engineering
  - Graduate Institute of Electronic Engineering
  - Graduate Institute of Information Management
  - Graduate Institute of Central Asian Studies
  - Graduate Institute of Management
  - Graduate Institute of Geoinformatics and Disaster Reduction Technology
  - Graduate Institute of International Business Management
  - Graduate Institute of Engineering and Environment Geophysics
  - Graduate Institute of Computer, Communication and System Engineering
  - Graduate Institute of Computer Science and Information Engineering
  - Graduate Institute of Finance and Banking
  - Graduate Institute of Engineering Science and Technology

=== Degree programs ===
  - Property Management Degree Program
  - Materials Processing Technology Degree Program
  - SOC Business Management Degree Program

== Research centers ==
=== National research centers ===
- E-GPS Research Center

=== Other centers and laboratories ===
- Green Energy Research Center
- Logistic Management Research Center
- Euro-Asia Research Center
- Digital Earth and Disaster Reduction Research Center
- Engineering & Environment Geophysics Laboratory

== International Academic Exchanges ==
=== Dual degree ===
- University of Colorado at Colorado Springs, United States (3-2 programs)
- Hanoi University of Business and Management, Vietnam (2-2.1-1 programs)

=== Partner universities ===
- United States
  - Appalachian State University
  - Murray State University
  - Saint Leo University
- Russia
  - Moscow State University
  - Saint Petersburg State University
  - Moscow State University of Technology "Stankin"
  - Far Eastern State Technical University
  - Moscow Academy of Government and Municipal Management, MAGMU
  - Moscow Aviation Institute (State University of Aerospace Technology)
  - Moscow State University Of Culture And Arts
  - Moscow State Institute of Radioengeneering, Electronic and Automation
  - Saint Petersburg State University of Aerospace Instrumentation
  - Buryat State University
- United Kingdom
  - Aberystwyth University
  - Nottingham Trent University
  - Queen's University Belfast
- Tajikistan
  - Russian-Tajik Slavonic University
- Kazakhstan
  - Al - Farabi Kazakh National University
  - Kainar University
  - Kazakh Academic University
  - Kazakhstan Institute of Management, Economics and Strategic Research （KIMEP）
- Kyrgyzstan
  - Institute of History National academy of science
- Azerbaijan
  - Baku State University
- Turkey
  - Süleyman Demirel University
- South Korea
  - Kyungil University
- Vietnam
  - Hanoi University of Technology
  - Hung Vuong University
- Malaysia
  - Southern College
  - New Era College
  - McOrange College
- Paraguay
  - National University of Asuncion
- China
  - Zhengzhou University
  - Huazhong University of Science and Technology

== Surroundings ==
- Jhongli Station
- THSR Taoyuan Station
- Chung Yuan Christian University
- Ching Yun Commercial Center

== Transportation ==
The university is accessible within walking distance South of Zhongli Station of Taiwan Railway.

== Notable alumni ==
- Frankie Huang, actor and television host

== See also ==
- List of universities in Taiwan
  - List of schools in the Republic of China reopened in Taiwan
- Education in Taiwan
