= National Kaohsiung Normal University =

University in Lingya, Kaohsiung, Taiwan

- 國立高雄師範大學
- Former names: Taiwan Provincial Kaohsiung Teachers' College
- Motto: 誠敬宏遠
- Motto in English: Sincerity, Reverence, Greatness and Profundity
- Type: National public university
- Established: 1954
- Academic staff: 313 (full time)
- Undergraduates: 3,370
- Postgraduates: 3,393
- Doctoral students: 845
- Location: Kaohsiung, Taiwan; 22.625562°N 120.319843°E
- Campus: Ho-Ping, Yan-Chao
- Website: nknu.edu.tw

National Kaohsiung Normal University
- Traditional Chinese: 國立高雄師範大學
- Simplified Chinese: 国立高雄师范大学
Transcriptions
Standard Mandarin
- Hanyu Pinyin: Guólì Gāoxióng Shīfàn Dàxué

National Kaohsiung Normal University (NKNU) is a public university located in Lingya District, Kaohsiung, Taiwan. Founded in 1967, the university has two campuses: Ho-Ping and Yan-Chao. It also consists of five colleges: Education, Humanities, Science, Technology, and Arts.

== History ==
The university was originally established as Provincial Kaohsiung Female Teachers' College in 1954. In 1967, the college was renamed as Taiwan Provincial Kaohsiung Teachers' College by the Taiwan Provincial Government. On July 1, 1980 the college was renamed National Kaohsiung Teachers' College. On 1 August 1989, it was re-designated as National Kaohsiung Normal University. In 1989, the university initiated the plan to build the second campus in Yanchao District and inaugurated the campus in 1990.

== Campus ==
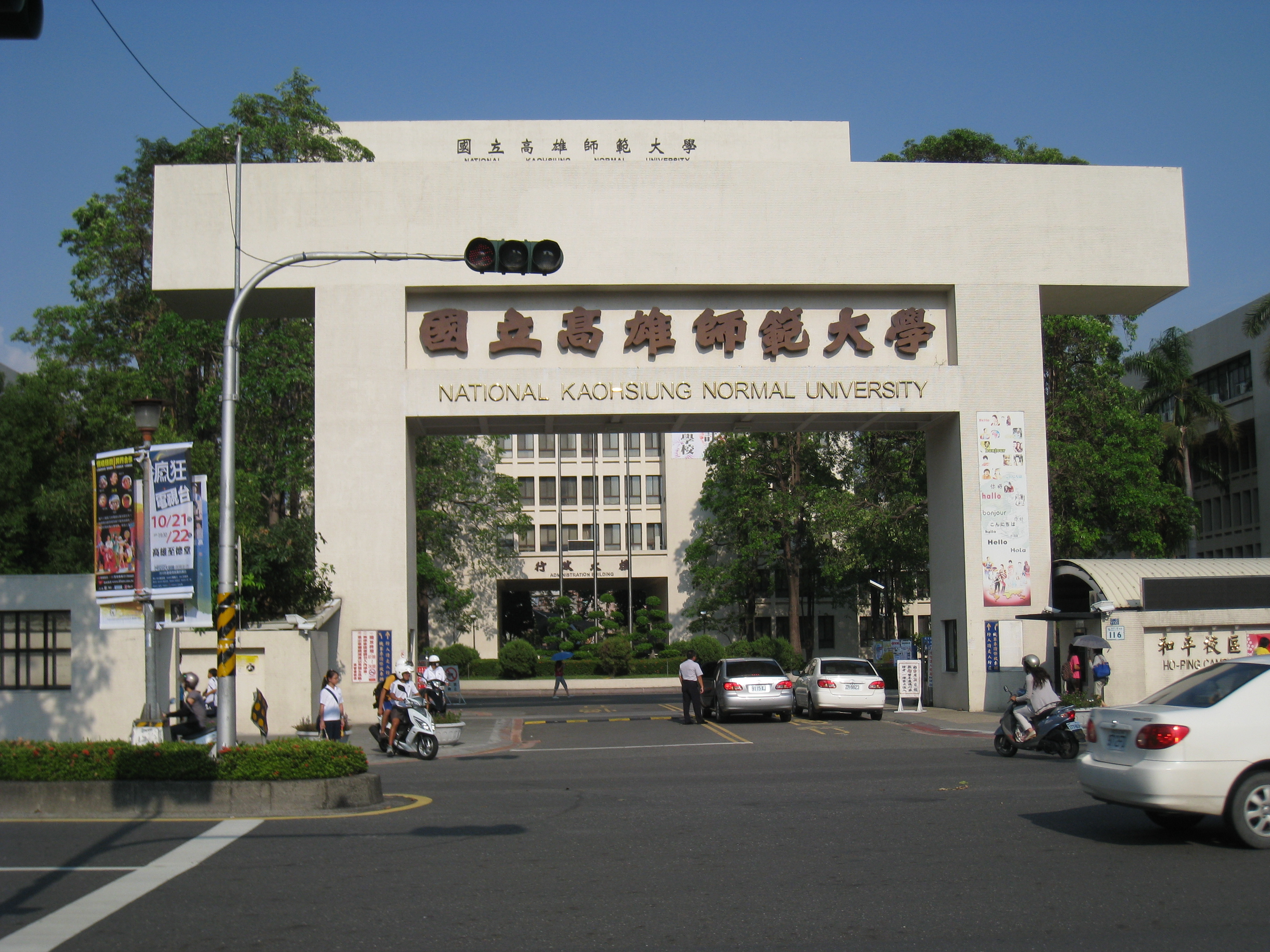

There are currently more than 70 intramural student organizations, each with a faculty member as a consultant. The eight-floor multi-purpose Activity Center makes space available for clubs and recreational activities. Both on Ho-Ping and Yan-Chao campuses, the University provides men’s and women’s dormitories. Meals are provided on campus with the coordination of food committee. Respectively on each campus, there is also a Medicare Center with physicians, dentists and psychiatrists to provide medical services to faculty and students.

=== Ho-Ping Campus ===
It is located in urban Kaohsiung, opposite the Kaohsiung Cultural Center. The campus covers an area of 13 hectares.

=== Yan-Chao Campus ===
In September 1999, NKNU inaugurated its second campus at Yan-Chao, which is an area of 50 hectares about 30 minutes drive from downtown Kaohsiung.

== Academics ==
NKNU offers Bachelor's degrees, Master's degrees, and Doctorate degrees in many disciplines.

- Programs Degrees Offer to International Students.
- Undergraduate Program: 4–6 years.
- Master Program/Postgraduate Program: 2–3 years.
- Doctoral Program：2–6 years.
- National Kaohsiung Normal University Bulletin of International Student Admissions 2013-2014 Academic Year.
- Application from 21 March 2013 to 15 April 2013.
- Delivery of Application Postmarked by 15 April 2013 (Taiwan Time).

University rankings

Regional – Overall
- QS Asia: 901+ (2025)

== International Sister Universities ==
- Australia
  - Curtin University
  - University of Sydney
- Canada
  - University of Ottawa
- China
  - Beijing Normal University
  - Shanghai Normal University
  - South China Normal University
  - East China Normal University
  - Northeast Normal University
  - Shaanxi Normal University
  - Central China Normal University
  - Hunan Normal University
  - Renmin University of China
  - Guangzhou University
  - Jinan University
  - Nanchang University
  - Xiamen University
- Hungary
  - Franz Liszt Academy of Music
- (Czech Republic) Czech
  - Czech Technical University in Prague
- France
  - Paris Diderot University
- Germany
  - University of Paderborn
- Hong Kong
  - Education University of Hong Kong
- India
  - Vel Tech Rangarajan Dr.Sagunthala R&D Institute of Science and Technology (Deemed to be University), Chennai
- Japan
  - Osaka Kyoiku University
  - Hosei University
- Korea
  - Hallym University
  - Kyungpook National University
- Malaysia
  - Universiti Tunku Abdul Rahman
- (United Kingdom) U.K.
  - Institute of Education
- (United States) U.S.
  - University of Illinois
  - University of Alaska System
  - University of North Carolina at Charlotte
  - University of North Dakota
  - College of Charleston

== Notable alumni ==
Prominent faculty members include:

- Huang Kuang-nan, Minister without Portfolio (2012-2014).
- Tsao Chi-hung, Minister of Council of Agriculture (2016-2017).
- Tsai Ching-hwa, Political Deputy Minister of Education.
- Pan Men-an, Magistrate of Pingtung County.
- Huang Hsiu-meng – member of the Legislative Yuan

== See also ==
- List of universities in Taiwan
