= 2021–22 T1 League regular season =

1st T1 League regular season

T1 League
- Season: 2021–22
- Duration: November 27, 2021 – May 20, 2022
- Games played: 30 per team
- Teams: 6

Regular season
- Season MVP: Chiang Yu-An (HeroBears)

Statistical leaders
Points	Diamond Stone (HeroBears)	27.5
Rebounds	William Artino (GhostHawks)	15.8
Assists	Jason Brickman (Aquas)	10.3

Records
- Biggest home win: DEA 67–108 Aquas (December 18, 2021)
- Biggest away win: Aquas 116–82 Leopards (January 15, 2022)
- Highest scoring: GhostHawks 115–144 HeroBears (May 18, 2022)
- Lowest scoring: DEA 67–108 Aquas (December 18, 2021)
- Winning streak: 5 games Aquas (2 times); Suns
- Losing streak: 9 games Leopards; GhostHawks
- All statistics correct as of May 20, 2022.

The 2021–22 T1 League regular season was the first regular season of T1 League. Participating teams included the Kaohsiung Aquas, New Taipei CTBC DEA, Taichung Wagor Suns, Tainan TSG GhostHawks, TaiwanBeer HeroBears, and the Taoyuan Leopards. Each team played against another six times, three at home and three on the road, respectively, led to 30 matches in total. The regular season started on November 27, 2021 and ended on May 20, 2022. The 2021–22 season opening game, matched by the Kaohsiung Aquas and the TaiwanBeer HeroBears, was played at University of Taipei Tianmu Campus Gymnasium.

== League table ==
Pos	Team	Pld	W	L	PCT	GB	Qualification
1	Kaohsiung Aquas	30	23	7	.767	—	Advance to semifinals
2	Taichung Wagor Suns	30	20	10	.667	3	Advance to semifinals
3	New Taipei CTBC DEA	30	17	13	.567	6	Advance to semifinals
4	TaiwanBeer HeroBears	30	16	14	.533	7	Advance to play-in
5	Taoyuan Leopards	30	8	22	.267	15	Advance to play-in
6	Tainan TSG GhostHawks	30	6	24	.200	17	

Source: T1 League

=== Head to head ===
Home \ Away	HEROBEARS	DEA	LEOPARDS	SUNS	GHOSTHAWKS	AQUAS
TaiwanBeer HeroBears	—	2–1	3–0	2–1	1–2	1–2
New Taipei CTBC DEA	2–1	—	3–0	1–2	3–0	1–2
Taoyuan Leopards	3–0	1–2	—	0–3	2–1	0–3
Taichung Wagor Suns	1–2	2–1	3–0	—	3–0	1–2
Tainan TSG GhostHawks	1–2	0–3	1–2	0–3	—	1–2
Kaohsiung Aquas	1–2	3–0	3–0	2–1	3–0	—

Source: T1 League
Legend: Blue = home team win; Red = away team win.
Matches with lighter background shading were decided after overtime.

== Matches ==
=== Matchweek 1 (opening match) ===
November 27, 2021 Regular #01	Kaohsiung Aquas	107–106	TaiwanBeer HeroBears	Taipei City
17:30 (UTC+8)	Scoring by quarter: 25–39, 35–29, 29–11, 18–27
	Pts: Kupšas 27; Rebs: Kupšas 15; Asts: Brickman 8	boxscore	Pts: Stone 44; Rebs: Stone 13; Asts: Mitchell, Chiang Yu-An 6	Arena: University of Taipei Tianmu Campus Gymnasium; Attendance: 3,456

=== Matchweek 2 ===
December 4, 2021 Regular #02	TaiwanBeer HeroBears	95–94(OT)	New Taipei CTBC DEA	New Taipei City
17:30 (UTC+8)	Scoring by quarter: 33–20, 19–19, 12–24, 16–17, Overtime: 15–14
	Pts: Stone 26; Rebs: Stone 17; Asts: Mitchell 8	boxscore	Pts: Johnson 22; Rebs: Ibeh 15; Asts: Jakrawan 3	Arena: Xinzhuang Gymnasium; Attendance: 6,323

December 5, 2021 Regular #03	Kaohsiung Aquas	87–69	New Taipei CTBC DEA	New Taipei City
17:30 (UTC+8)	Scoring by quarter: 22–26, 18–11, 23–16, 24–16
	Pts: Kupšas 28; Rebs: Kupšas 19; Asts: Brickman 7	boxscore	Pts: Bachir 23; Rebs: Bachir 11; Asts: Bachir, Johnson 3	Arena: Xinzhuang Gymnasium; Attendance: 4,632

=== Matchweek 3 ===
December 11, 2021 Regular #04	Taoyuan Leopards	77–85	New Taipei CTBC DEA	New Taipei City
15:00 (UTC+8)	Scoring by quarter: 13–29, 18–21, 19–14, 27–21
	Pts: Tiongson 19; Rebs: Orton 28; Asts: Orton 5	boxscore	Pts: Bachir 22; Rebs: Bachir 13; Asts: Morrison 8	Arena: Xinzhuang Gymnasium

December 11, 2021 Regular #05	Taichung Wagor Suns	111–117	TaiwanBeer HeroBears	Taipei City
17:30 (UTC+8)	Scoring by quarter: 40–27, 25–29, 16–25, 30–36
	Pts: Sakakini 40; Rebs: Sakakini 16; Asts: Sakakini 7	boxscore	Pts: Stone 47; Rebs: Stone 12; Asts: Mitchell 10	Arena: University of Taipei Tianmu Campus Gymnasium

December 12, 2021 Regular #06	Tainan TSG GhostHawks	81–108	New Taipei CTBC DEA	New Taipei City
15:00 (UTC+8)	Scoring by quarter: 27–29, 18–28, 23–24, 13–27
	Pts: García 22; Rebs: García 12; Asts: García 7	boxscore	Pts: Hsieh Ya-Hsuan 21; Rebs: Johnson 17; Asts: Morrison 5	Arena: Xinzhuang Gymnasium

December 12, 2021 Regular #07	Taoyuan Leopards	93–102	TaiwanBeer HeroBears	Taipei City
17:30 (UTC+8)	Scoring by quarter: 17–23, 18–23, 31–23, 27–33
	Pts: Mitrović 30; Rebs: Orton 10; Asts: Yu Meng-Yun 7	boxscore	Pts: Stone 24; Rebs: Chiang Yu-An 10; Asts: Chiang Yu-An, Stone 7	Arena: University of Taipei Tianmu Campus Gymnasium

=== Matchweek 4 ===
December 18, 2021 Regular #08	Taoyuan Leopards	89–81	Tainan TSG GhostHawks	Tainan City
15:00 (UTC+8)	Scoring by quarter: 25–21, 14–26, 30–16, 20–18
	Pts: Mitrović 21; Rebs: Orton 21; Asts: Orton 6	boxscore	Pts: García 26; Rebs: García 14; Asts: Liu Jen-Hao 4	Arena: Chia Nan University of Pharmacy and Science Shao Tsung Gymnasium

December 18, 2021 Regular #09	New Taipei CTBC DEA	67–108	Kaohsiung Aquas	Kaohsiung City
17:30 (UTC+8)	Scoring by quarter: 24–26, 18–23, 8–25, 17–34
	Pts: Lin Ping-Sheng 14; Rebs: Johnson 12; Asts: five players 2	boxscore	Pts: Yu Huan-Ya 29; Rebs: Kupšas 19; Asts: Brickman 8	Arena: Kaohsiung Arena; Attendance: 8,268

December 19, 2021 Regular #10	TaiwanBeer HeroBears	102–83	Tainan TSG GhostHawks	Tainan City
15:00 (UTC+8)	Scoring by quarter: 28–22, 28–17, 23–26, 23–18
	Pts: Stone 33; Rebs: Stone 19; Asts: Mitchell, Lee Chi-Wei 4	boxscore	Pts: Chatman 29; Rebs: García 15; Asts: Liu Jen-Hao, Kao Kuo-Chiang 3	Arena: Chia Nan University of Pharmacy and Science Shao Tsung Gymnasium

December 19, 2021 Regular #11	Taichung Wagor Suns	81–92	Kaohsiung Aquas	Kaohsiung City
17:30 (UTC+8)	Scoring by quarter: 18–21, 26–27, 23–23, 14–21
	Pts: Sakakini 24; Rebs: Gee 22; Asts: Gee 5	boxscore	Pts: Brickman 22; Rebs: Kupšas 13; Asts: Brickman 5	Arena: Kaohsiung Arena; Attendance: 3,507

=== Matchweek 5 ===
December 25, 2021 Regular #12	New Taipei CTBC DEA	85–72	Taoyuan Leopards	Taoyuan City
15:00 (UTC+8)	Scoring by quarter: 23–24, 23–14, 23–16, 16–18
	Pts: Bachir 28; Rebs: Johnson 11; Asts: Bachir, Lin Ping-Sheng 3	boxscore	Pts: Mitrović 25; Rebs: Tiongson 16; Asts: Orton 5	Arena: Chung Yuan Christian University Gymnasium; Attendance: 2,086

December 25, 2021 Regular #13	TaiwanBeer HeroBears	102–110	Taichung Wagor Suns	Taichung City
17:30 (UTC+8)	Scoring by quarter: 21–22, 37–32, 13–25, 31–31
	Pts: Stone 35; Rebs: Stone 15; Asts: Mitchell, Chiang Yu-An 5	boxscore	Pts: Sakakini 29; Rebs: Sakakini 9 Asts: Ting Sheng-Ju 5	Arena: National Taiwan University of Sport Gymnasium

December 26, 2021 Regular #14	Tainan TSG GhostHawks	114–83	Taoyuan Leopards	Taoyuan City
15:00 (UTC+8)	Scoring by quarter: 36–13, 28–27, 23–18, 27–25
	Pts: Chatman 26; Rebs: Artino 15; Asts: García 5	boxscore	Pts: Tiongson 26; Rebs: Tiongson 11; Asts: three players 3	Arena: Chung Yuan Christian University Gymnasium

December 26, 2021 Regular #15	Kaohsiung Aquas	88–93	Taichung Wagor Suns	Taichung City
17:30 (UTC+8)	Scoring by quarter: 25–14, 28–31, 19–22, 16–26
	Pts: Hu Long-Mao 18; Rebs: Alexander 9 Asts: Brickman 6	boxscore	Pts: Sakakini 31; Rebs: Sakakini 10; Asts: Ting Sheng-Ju 5	Arena: National Taiwan University of Sport Gymnasium

=== Matchweek 6 ===
December 31, 2021 Regular #16	TaiwanBeer HeroBears	113–114	Kaohsiung Aquas	Kaohsiung City
15:00 (UTC+8)	Scoring by quarter: 20–37, 28–18, 30–38, 35–21
	Pts: Stone 29; Rebs: Stone 12; Asts: Chiang Yu-An 8	boxscore	Pts: Brickman 29; Rebs: Hu Long-Mao 8 Asts: Brickman 10	Arena: Kaohsiung Arena; Attendance: 3,321

January 1, 2022 Regular #17	New Taipei CTBC DEA	95–85	Taichung Wagor Suns	Taichung City
15:00 (UTC+8)	Scoring by quarter: 21–19, 33–23, 12–22, 29–21
	Pts: Johnson 23; Rebs: Johnson 12; Asts: Bachir, Johnson 5	boxscore	Pts: Heading 17; Rebs: Sakakini 13; Asts: Sakakini 6	Arena: National Taiwan University of Sport Gymnasium

January 1, 2022 Regular #18	Taoyuan Leopards	113–132	Tainan TSG GhostHawks	Tainan City
17:30 (UTC+8)	Scoring by quarter: 32–32, 35–32, 15–32, 31–36
	Pts: Williams 38; Rebs: Tiongson 17; Asts: Cheng Wei 6	boxscore	Pts: Artino 41; Rebs: Artino 22; Asts: Artino 8	Arena: Chia Nan University of Pharmacy and Science Shao Tsung Gymnasium

January 2, 2022 Regular #19	TaiwanBeer HeroBears	95–88	Taichung Wagor Suns	Taichung City
15:00 (UTC+8)	Scoring by quarter: 23–25, 24–24, 14–19, 34–20
	Pts: Stone 26; Rebs: Stone 15; Asts: Chiang Yu-An 8	boxscore	Pts: Sakakini 23; Rebs: Gee, Sakakini 9 Asts: Gee, Wright 4	Arena: National Taiwan University of Sport Gymnasium

January 2, 2022 Regular #20	Kaohsiung Aquas	126–95	Tainan TSG GhostHawks	Tainan City
17:30 (UTC+8)	Scoring by quarter: 27–24, 34–26, 33–17, 32–28
	Pts: Alexander 26; Rebs: Hu Long-Mao 11; Asts: Brickman 8	boxscore	Pts: Artino 33; Rebs: Artino 12; Asts: Liu Jen-Hao 5	Arena: Chia Nan University of Pharmacy and Science Shao Tsung Gymnasium

=== Matchweek 7 ===
January 8, 2022 Regular #21	New Taipei CTBC DEA	76–93	Kaohsiung Aquas	Kaohsiung City
15:00 (UTC+8)	Scoring by quarter: 19–24, 27–22, 14–28, 16–19
	Pts: Johnson 21; Rebs: Johnson 14; Asts: Lin Ping-Sheng 4	boxscore	Pts: Kupšas 26; Rebs: Kupšas 30; Asts: Brickman 8	Arena: Kaohsiung Arena; Attendance: 2,633

January 8, 2022 Regular #22	TaiwanBeer HeroBears	91–84	Taichung Wagor Suns	Taichung City
17:30 (UTC+8)	Scoring by quarter: 19–20, 27–23, 16–20, 29–21
	Pts: Chiang Yu-An 28; Rebs: Stone 14; Asts: Stone 9	boxscore	Pts: Heading 25; Rebs: Sakakini 21; Asts: three players 6	Arena: National Taiwan University of Sport Gymnasium

January 9, 2022 Regular #23	Tainan TSG GhostHawks	83–96	Kaohsiung Aquas	Kaohsiung City
15:00 (UTC+8)	Scoring by quarter: 16–22, 24–21, 17–31, 26–22
	Pts: Artino 27; Rebs: Artino 15; Asts: five players 2	boxscore	Pts: Hu Long-Mao 29; Rebs: Hu Long-Mao 17; Asts: Brickman 9	Arena: Kaohsiung Arena

January 9, 2022 Regular #24	Taoyuan Leopards	74–101	Taichung Wagor Suns	Taichung City
17:30 (UTC+8)	Scoring by quarter: 17–16, 23–33, 18–30, 16–22
	Pts: Tiongson 27; Rebs: Tiongson 17; Asts: Cheng Wei 5	boxscore	Pts: Sakakini 23; Rebs: Wright 12; Asts: Ting Sheng-Ju 6	Arena: National Taiwan University of Sport Gymnasium

=== Matchweek 8 ===
January 15, 2022 Regular #25	TaiwanBeer HeroBears	95–113	New Taipei CTBC DEA	New Taipei City
15:00 (UTC+8)	Scoring by quarter: 26–26, 14–29, 21–30, 34–28
	Pts: Chiang Yu-An 30; Rebs: Stone 15; Asts: Chou Tzu-hua 5	boxscore	Pts: Early 33; Rebs: Johnson 12; Asts: Johnson, Early 5	Arena: Xinzhuang Gymnasium

January 15, 2022 Regular #26	Kaohsiung Aquas	116–82	Taoyuan Leopards	Taoyuan City
17:30 (UTC+8)	Scoring by quarter: 29–22, 36–25, 24–13, 27–22
	Pts: Hu Long-Mao 20; Rebs: Kupšas 18; Asts: Brickman 9	boxscore	Pts: Gillon, Du Yu-Cheng 15; Rebs: Tsai Yang-Ming, Davis 10; Asts: Tiongson 5	Arena: Chung Yuan Christian University Gymnasium; Attendance: 0

January 16, 2022 Regular #27	Tainan TSG GhostHawks	104–116	New Taipei CTBC DEA	New Taipei City
15:00 (UTC+8)	Scoring by quarter: 20–24, 28–38, 27–14, 29–40
	Pts: Artino 29; Rebs: Liu Jen-Hao, Artino 10; Asts: Liu Jen-Hao 7	boxscore	Pts: Early 33; Rebs: Johnson 13; Asts: Early 11	Arena: Xinzhuang Gymnasium

January 16, 2022 Regular #28	Taichung Wagor Suns	119–115	Taoyuan Leopards	Taoyuan City
17:30 (UTC+8)	Scoring by quarter: 34–33, 23–25, 28–23, 34–34
	Pts: Sakakini 35; Rebs: Sakakini 20; Asts: Ting Sheng-Ju 7	boxscore	Pts: Williams 31; Rebs: Williams 11; Asts: Gillon 11	Arena: Chung Yuan Christian University Gymnasium; Attendance: 0

=== Matchweek 9 ===
Postponed (Note: The match, originally scheduled for January 22, 2022, was postponed to May 7, 2022 due to the COVID-19 pandemic preventive measures of Taipei City Government.) Regular #29	Tainan TSG GhostHawks	vs.	TaiwanBeer HeroBears	Taipei City
		boxscore		Arena: University of Taipei Tianmu Campus Gymnasium

January 22, 2022 Regular #30	Taoyuan Leopards	104–125	New Taipei CTBC DEA	New Taipei City
17:30 (UTC+8)	Scoring by quarter: 21–31, 31–34, 26–36, 26–24
	Pts: Gillon 29; Rebs: Williams 13; Asts: Gillon 4	boxscore	Pts: Early 36; Rebs: Early 15; Asts: Wei Chia-Hao 9	Arena: Xinzhuang Gymnasium

Postponed (Note: The match, originally scheduled for January 23, 2022, was postponed to May 8, 2022 due to the COVID-19 pandemic preventive measures of Taipei City Government.) Regular #31	Kaohsiung Aquas	vs.	TaiwanBeer HeroBears	Taipei City
		boxscore		Arena: University of Taipei Tianmu Campus Gymnasium

January 23, 2022 Regular #32	Taichung Wagor Suns	99–92	New Taipei CTBC DEA	New Taipei City
17:30 (UTC+8)	Scoring by quarter: 24–24, 22–26, 23–19, 30–23
	Pts: Sakakini, Heading 23; Rebs: Sakakini 17; Asts: Ting Sheng-Ju 7	boxscore	Pts: Early 31; Rebs: Johnson, Early 10; Asts: Wei Chia-Hao 4	Arena: Xinzhuang Gymnasium

=== Matchweek 10 ===
January 28, 2022 Regular #33	Taichung Wagor Suns	104–89	Kaohsiung Aquas	Kaohsiung City
19:00 (UTC+8)	Scoring by quarter: 23–22, 26–20, 31–21, 24–26
	Pts: Sakakini 31; Rebs: Sakakini 15; Asts: Sakakini 5	boxscore	Pts: Kupšas 31; Rebs: Kupšas 21; Asts: Brickman 12	Arena: Kaohsiung Arena; Attendance: 0

January 29, 2022 Regular #34	New Taipei CTBC DEA	115–97	Tainan TSG GhostHawks	Tainan City
15:00 (UTC+8)	Scoring by quarter: 28–27, 39–25, 23–20, 25–25
	Pts: Early 29; Rebs: Johnson 14; Asts: Bachir 8	boxscore	Pts: García 24; Rebs: Artino 17; Asts: Liu Jen-Hao 5	Arena: Chia Nan University of Pharmacy and Science Shao Tsung Gymnasium

Postponed (Note: The match, originally scheduled for January 29, 2022, was postponed to April 30, 2022 due to the COVID-19 pandemic in Taiwan.) Regular #35	TaiwanBeer HeroBears	vs.	Taoyuan Leopards	Taoyuan City
		boxscore		Arena: Chung Yuan Christian University Gymnasium

January 30, 2022 Regular #36	Taichung Wagor Suns	98–95	Tainan TSG GhostHawks	Tainan City
15:00 (UTC+8)	Scoring by quarter: 23–26, 18–21, 27–27, 30–21
	Pts: Heading 28; Rebs: Sakakini 11; Asts: Ting Sheng-Ju 7	boxscore	Pts: Artino 41; Rebs: Artino 20; Asts: Liu Jen-Hao 6	Arena: Chia Nan University of Pharmacy and Science Shao Tsung Gymnasium

January 30, 2022 Regular #37	TaiwanBeer HeroBears	100–94	Kaohsiung Aquas	Kaohsiung City
17:30 (UTC+8)	Scoring by quarter: 35–27, 20–27, 17–27, 28–13
	Pts: Galloway 38; Rebs: Stone 14; Asts: Galloway 7	boxscore	Pts: Kupšas 27; Rebs: Kupšas 15; Asts: Brickman 10	Arena: Kaohsiung Arena; Attendance: 0

=== Matchweek 11 ===
Postponed (Note: The match, originally scheduled for February 5, 2022, was postponed to May 1, 2022 due to the COVID-19 pandemic in Taiwan.) Regular #38	Kaohsiung Aquas	vs.	Taoyuan Leopards	Taoyuan City
		boxscore		Arena: Chung Yuan Christian University Gymnasium

Postponed (Note: The match, originally scheduled for February 6, 2022, was postponed to April 29, 2022 due to the COVID-19 pandemic in Taiwan.) Regular #39	Taichung Wagor Suns	vs.	Taoyuan Leopards	Taoyuan City
		boxscore		Arena: Chung Yuan Christian University Gymnasium

=== Matchweek 12 ===
February 12, 2022 Regular #40	Taichung Wagor Suns	71–87	Kaohsiung Aquas	Kaohsiung City
15:00 (UTC+8)	Scoring by quarter: 15–24, 19–24, 24–22, 13–17
	Pts: Sakakini 24; Rebs: Sakakini 22; Asts: Ting Sheng-Ju, Wright 4	boxscore	Pts: Kupšas 20; Rebs: Kupšas 12; Asts: Brickman 9	Arena: Kaohsiung Arena

February 12, 2022 Regular #41	TaiwanBeer HeroBears	114–105	Tainan TSG GhostHawks	Tainan City
17:30 (UTC+8)	Scoring by quarter: 33–24, 25–24, 28–37, 28–20
	Pts: Galloway 40; Rebs: Stone 12; Asts: Chiang Yu-An 10	boxscore	Pts: García 33; Rebs: Artino, García 12; Asts: Liu Jen-Hao 8	Arena: Chia Nan University of Pharmacy and Science Shao Tsung Gymnasium

February 13, 2022 Regular #42	Taoyuan Leopards	116–133	Kaohsiung Aquas	Kaohsiung City
15:00 (UTC+8)	Scoring by quarter: 28–36, 31–32, 22–28, 35–37
	Pts: Tiongson 30; Rebs: Williams 17; Asts: Gillon, Williams 5	boxscore	Pts: Kupšas 37; Rebs: Kupšas 17; Asts: Brickman 8	Arena: Kaohsiung Arena

February 13, 2022 Regular #43	New Taipei CTBC DEA	102–88	Tainan TSG GhostHawks	Tainan City
17:30 (UTC+8)	Scoring by quarter: 27–16, 27–21, 31–25, 17–26
	Pts: Bachir 28; Rebs: Johnson 17; Asts: Bachir, Early 4	boxscore	Pts: Artino 32; Rebs: Artino 23; Asts: Liu Jen-Hao 3	Arena: Chia Nan University of Pharmacy and Science Shao Tsung Gymnasium

=== Matchweek 13 ===
February 19, 2022 Regular #44	New Taipei CTBC DEA	115–94	TaiwanBeer HeroBears	Taipei City
15:00 (UTC+8)	Scoring by quarter: 36–24, 28–28, 30–17, 21–25
	Pts: Early 31; Rebs: Ibeh 14; Asts: Johnson 7	boxscore	Pts: Stone 25; Rebs: Stone 10; Asts: Chou Tzu-hua 5	Arena: Taipei Heping Basketball Gymnasium; Attendance: 2,468

Postponed (Note: The match, originally scheduled for February 19, 2022, was postponed to March 25, 2022 due to the COVID-19 pandemic in Taiwan.) Regular #45	Tainan TSG GhostHawks	vs.	Taoyuan Leopards	Taoyuan City
		boxscore		Arena: Chung Yuan Christian University Gymnasium

February 20, 2022 Regular #46	Taichung Wagor Suns	115–95	TaiwanBeer HeroBears	Taipei City
15:00 (UTC+8)	Scoring by quarter: 25–21, 25–27, 30–23, 35–24
	Pts: Heading 36; Rebs: Sakakini 12; Asts: Tucker 7	boxscore	Pts: Galloway 23; Rebs: Moore 8 Asts: Galloway 5	Arena: Taipei Heping Basketball Gymnasium

Postponed (Note: The match, originally scheduled for February 20, 2022, was postponed to March 11, 2022 due to the COVID-19 pandemic in Taiwan.) Regular #47	Kaohsiung Aquas	vs.	Taoyuan Leopards	Taoyuan City
		boxscore		Arena: Chung Yuan Christian University Gymnasium

=== Matchweek 14 ===
February 25, 2022 Regular #48	New Taipei CTBC DEA	116–118	TaiwanBeer HeroBears	Taipei City
19:00 (UTC+8)	Scoring by quarter: 26–36, 27–21, 25–31, 38–30
	Pts: Bachir, Johnson 28; Rebs: Johnson 10; Asts: Hsieh Ya-Hsuan 8	boxscore	Pts: Chiang Yu-An 43; Rebs: Stone 10; Asts: Chiang Yu-An 10	Arena: University of Taipei Tianmu Campus Gymnasium

February 26, 2022 Regular #49	Kaohsiung Aquas	125–131(OT)	TaiwanBeer HeroBears	Taipei City
17:30 (UTC+8)	Scoring by quarter: 27–24, 31–34, 28–24, 27–31, Overtime: 12–18
	Pts: Brickman 25; Rebs: Kupšas 20; Asts: Brickman 16	boxscore	Pts: Chiang Yu-An, Galloway 33; Rebs: Moore 13; Asts: Chiang Yu-An 12	Arena: University of Taipei Tianmu Campus Gymnasium

February 27, 2022 Regular #50	Taoyuan Leopards	102–108	Taichung Wagor Suns	Taichung City
15:00 (UTC+8)	Scoring by quarter: 30–19, 13–26, 23–32, 36–31
	Pts: Gillon 26; Rebs: Davis 18; Asts: Gillon 6	boxscore	Pts: Sakakini 29; Rebs: Sakakini 14; Asts: Tucker 5	Arena: National Taiwan University of Sport Gymnasium

February 27, 2022 Regular #51	New Taipei CTBC DEA	119–103	Tainan TSG GhostHawks	Tainan City
17:30 (UTC+8)	Scoring by quarter: 35–22, 38–33, 24–21, 22–27
	Pts: Bachir 52; Rebs: Ibeh 11; Asts: Hsieh Ya-Hsuan 8	boxscore	Pts: Gilbert 27; Rebs: García 11; Asts: Webster-Chan 5	Arena: Chia Nan University of Pharmacy and Science Shao Tsung Gymnasium

February 28, 2022 Regular #52	Kaohsiung Aquas	122–113(OT)	Taichung Wagor Suns	Taichung City
15:00 (UTC+8)	Scoring by quarter: 24–28, 26–26, 26–33, 29–18, Overtime: 17–8
	Pts: Yu Huan-Ya 26; Rebs: Kupšas 13; Asts: Hu Long-Mao, Alexander 8	boxscore	Pts: Heading 36; Rebs: Sun Szu-Yao 10; Asts: Sakakini 4	Arena: National Taiwan University of Sport Gymnasium

February 28, 2022 Regular #53	Taoyuan Leopards	118–99	Tainan TSG GhostHawks	Tainan City
17:30 (UTC+8)	Scoring by quarter: 40–22, 17–32, 24–26, 37–19
	Pts: Gillon 34; Rebs: Davis 20; Asts: Gillon 8	boxscore	Pts: García 27; Rebs: García 13; Asts: Gilbert, García 4	Arena: Chia Nan University of Pharmacy and Science Shao Tsung Gymnasium

=== Matchweek 15 ===
March 4, 2022 Regular #54	TaiwanBeer HeroBears	127–135(OT)	New Taipei CTBC DEA	New Taipei City
19:00 (UTC+8)	Scoring by quarter: 31–28, 27–36, 32–21, 28–33, Overtime: 9–17
	Pts: Galloway 29; Rebs: Stone, Moore 9 Asts: Chiang Yu-An 11	boxscore	Pts: Early 48; Rebs: Johnson 15; Asts: Early 12	Arena: Xinzhuang Gymnasium

March 5, 2022 Regular #55	Tainan TSG GhostHawks	113–110	TaiwanBeer HeroBears	Taipei City
15:00 (UTC+8)	Scoring by quarter: 36–31, 28–26, 27–19, 22–34
	Pts: Gilbert, García 28; Rebs: García 10; Asts: Liu Jen-Hao 7	boxscore	Pts: Galloway 27; Rebs: Galloway 11; Asts: Galloway 14	Arena: University of Taipei Tianmu Campus Gymnasium

March 5, 2022 Regular #56	Taichung Wagor Suns	113–105	New Taipei CTBC DEA	New Taipei City
17:30 (UTC+8)	Scoring by quarter: 25–28, 22–34, 36–27, 30–16
	Pts: Chen Ching-Huan 26; Rebs: Sakakini 14; Asts: Sakakini 11	boxscore	Pts: Early 37; Rebs: Johnson 10; Asts: Bachir, Early 5	Arena: Xinzhuang Gymnasium

March 6, 2022 Regular #57	Taoyuan Leopards	113–115	TaiwanBeer HeroBears	Taipei City
15:00 (UTC+8)	Scoring by quarter: 30–25, 38–24, 26–36, 19–30
	Pts: Williams 25; Rebs: Davis 19; Asts: Gillon 9	boxscore	Pts: Chiang Yu-An, Lee Chi-Wei 25; Rebs: Stone 11; Asts: Chiang Yu-An 13	Arena: University of Taipei Tianmu Campus Gymnasium

March 6, 2022 Regular #58	Kaohsiung Aquas	90–91	New Taipei CTBC DEA	New Taipei City
17:30 (UTC+8)	Scoring by quarter: 25–17, 28–25, 22–21, 15–28
	Pts: Kupšas 24; Rebs: Kupšas 14; Asts: Brickman 6	boxscore	Pts: Johnson 31; Rebs: Epps 15; Asts: Bachir 7	Arena: Xinzhuang Gymnasium

=== Matchweek 16 ===
March 11, 2022 Regular #47	Kaohsiung Aquas	106–100	Taoyuan Leopards	Taoyuan City
19:00 (UTC+8)	Scoring by quarter: 30–19, 26–23, 22–21, 28–37
	Pts: Kupšas 32; Rebs: Kupšas 9 Asts: Brickman 9	boxscore	Pts: Davis 26; Rebs: Davis 21; Asts: Gillon 7	Arena: Chung Yuan Christian University Gymnasium

March 12, 2022 Regular #59	Tainan TSG GhostHawks	91–115	Taichung Wagor Suns	Taichung City
15:00 (UTC+8)	Scoring by quarter: 29–23, 24–32, 23–28, 15–32
	Pts: García 24; Rebs: Gilbert 10; Asts: Gilbert 4	boxscore	Pts: Sakakini 26; Rebs: Sakakini 16; Asts: Tucker 6	Arena: National Taiwan University of Sport Gymnasium

March 12, 2022 Regular #60	TaiwanBeer HeroBears	96–101	Taoyuan Leopards	Taoyuan City
17:30 (UTC+8)	Scoring by quarter: 22–22, 27–25, 27–33, 20–21
	Pts: Galloway 31; Rebs: Chou Po-Hsun 13; Asts: Galloway 7	boxscore	Pts: Tiongson 23; Rebs: Davis 16; Asts: Gillon 6	Arena: Chung Yuan Christian University Gymnasium

March 13, 2022 Regular #61	Kaohsiung Aquas	98–81	Taichung Wagor Suns	Taichung City
15:00 (UTC+8)	Scoring by quarter: 27–16, 21–25, 24–18, 26–22
	Pts: Hu Long-Mao, Kupšas 19; Rebs: Kupšas 12; Asts: Brickman 15	boxscore	Pts: Sakakini 26; Rebs: Sakakini 14; Asts: Su Yi-Chin 5	Arena: National Taiwan University of Sport Gymnasium; Attendance: 4,678

March 13, 2022 Regular #62	Tainan TSG GhostHawks	84–97	Taoyuan Leopards	Taoyuan City
17:30 (UTC+8)	Scoring by quarter: 27–25, 28–31, 10–18, 19–23
	Pts: Chatman 22; Rebs: Revolution 13; Asts: Liu Jen-Hao 5	boxscore	Pts: Thomas 18; Rebs: Davis 15; Asts: Gillon 10	Arena: Chung Yuan Christian University Gymnasium

=== Matchweek 17 ===
March 19, 2022 Regular #63	Taichung Wagor Suns	112–85	Tainan TSG GhostHawks	Tainan City
15:00 (UTC+8)	Scoring by quarter: 27–20, 29–26, 28–18, 28–21
	Pts: Chen Ching-Huan 32; Rebs: Sakakini 17; Asts: Sakakini 10	boxscore	Pts: Liu Chun-Ting, Chatman 16; Rebs: García 11; Asts: Chiang Chiao-An, Liu Chun-Ting 4	Arena: Chia Nan University of Pharmacy and Science Shao Tsung Gymnasium

March 19, 2022 Regular #64	Taoyuan Leopards	84–111	Kaohsiung Aquas	Kaohsiung City
17:30 (UTC+8)	Scoring by quarter: 21–29, 18–24, 21–33, 24–25
	Pts: Davis 17; Rebs: Davis 7 Asts: Gillon 8	boxscore	Pts: Kupšas 24; Rebs: Hall 11; Asts: Brickman 9	Arena: Kaohsiung Arena

March 20, 2022 Regular #65	TaiwanBeer HeroBears	99–110	Tainan TSG GhostHawks	Tainan City
15:00 (UTC+8)	Scoring by quarter: 25–30, 22–32, 27–26, 25–22
	Pts: Stone 25; Rebs: Stone 12; Asts: Chiang Yu-An 6	boxscore	Pts: Gilbert 35; Rebs: Gilbert 8 Asts: Liu Jen-Hao, García 6	Arena: Chia Nan University of Pharmacy and Science Shao Tsung Gymnasium

March 20, 2022 Regular #66	New Taipei CTBC DEA	98–100	Kaohsiung Aquas	Kaohsiung City
17:30 (UTC+8)	Scoring by quarter: 23–28, 25–27, 30–20, 20–25
	Pts: Bachir, Epps 29; Rebs: Johnson 13; Asts: Hsieh Ya-Hsuan 7	boxscore	Pts: Kupšas 19; Rebs: Kupšas 23; Asts: Brickman 13	Arena: Kaohsiung Arena

=== Matchweek 18 ===
March 25, 2022 Regular #45	Tainan TSG GhostHawks	93–109	Taoyuan Leopards	Taoyuan City
19:00 (UTC+8)	Scoring by quarter: 25–30, 20–28, 25–23, 23–28
	Pts: Artino 23; Rebs: Artino 16; Asts: García 7	boxscore	Pts: Davis 29; Rebs: Davis 17; Asts: Gillon 10	Arena: Chung Yuan Christian University Gymnasium

March 26, 2022 Regular #67	TaiwanBeer HeroBears	99–92	Kaohsiung Aquas	Kaohsiung City
15:00 (UTC+8)	Scoring by quarter: 32–21, 22–24, 23–22, 22–25
	Pts: Lee Chi-Wei 23; Rebs: Deguara 10; Asts: Stone 5	boxscore	Pts: Yu Huan-Ya 26; Rebs: Kupšas 15; Asts: Brickman 11	Arena: Kaohsiung Arena

March 26, 2022 Regular #68	New Taipei CTBC DEA	97–116	Taichung Wagor Suns	Taichung City
17:30 (UTC+8)	Scoring by quarter: 24–22, 35–35, 17–32, 21–27
	Pts: Johnson 37; Rebs: three players 7 Asts: Scharer 7	boxscore	Pts: Sakakini 33; Rebs: Sakakini 15; Asts: Sakakini 8	Arena: National Taiwan University of Sport Gymnasium; Attendance: 4,877

March 27, 2022 Regular #69	Tainan TSG GhostHawks	93–103	Kaohsiung Aquas	Kaohsiung City
15:00 (UTC+8)	Scoring by quarter: 21–23, 18–35, 27–24, 27–21
	Pts: Prosper 26; Rebs: Artino 14; Asts: Artino 4	boxscore	Pts: Kupšas 27; Rebs: Kupšas 12; Asts: Brickman 19	Arena: Kaohsiung Arena

March 27, 2022 Regular #70	Taoyuan Leopards	93–98	Taichung Wagor Suns	Taichung City
17:30 (UTC+8)	Scoring by quarter: 17–21, 16–28, 37–32, 23–17
	Pts: Davis, Gillon 22; Rebs: Davis 18; Asts: Gillon 5	boxscore	Pts: Tucker 33; Rebs: Sakakini 21; Asts: Sakakini 8	Arena: National Taiwan University of Sport Gymnasium

=== Matchweek 19 ===
April 2, 2022 Regular #71	Tainan TSG GhostHawks	88–105	Taichung Wagor Suns	Taichung City
15:00 (UTC+8)	Scoring by quarter: 16–20, 21–33, 25–30, 26–22
	Pts: García 29; Rebs: Artino 14; Asts: Lu Chi-Erh 5	boxscore	Pts: Heading 25; Rebs: Sakakini 13; Asts: Sakakini 12	Arena: National Taiwan University of Sport Gymnasium

Postponed (Note: The match, originally scheduled for April 2, 2022, was postponed to May 7, 2022 due to the COVID-19 pandemic in Taiwan.) Regular #72	New Taipei CTBC DEA	vs.	Taoyuan Leopards	Taoyuan City
		boxscore		Arena: Chung Yuan Christian University Gymnasium

April 3, 2022 Regular #73	Kaohsiung Aquas	102–77	Tainan TSG GhostHawks	Tainan City
15:00 (UTC+8)	Scoring by quarter: 22–21, 15–17, 32–15, 33–24
	Pts: Kupšas 19; Rebs: Kupšas 12; Asts: Brickman 8	boxscore	Pts: Chatman 21; Rebs: Artino 17; Asts: Tsai Yao-Hsun, Chatman 3	Arena: Chia Nan University of Pharmacy and Science Shao Tsung Gymnasium

Postponed (Note: The match, originally scheduled for April 3, 2022, was postponed to May 8, 2022 due to the COVID-19 pandemic in Taiwan.) Regular #74	Taichung Wagor Suns	vs.	Taoyuan Leopards	Taoyuan City
		boxscore		Arena: Chung Yuan Christian University Gymnasium

April 4, 2022 Regular #75	New Taipei CTBC DEA	91–95	TaiwanBeer HeroBears	Taipei City
14:00 (UTC+8)	Scoring by quarter: 18–21, 29–34, 23–15, 21–25
	Pts: Allen 23; Rebs: Johnson 15; Asts: Scharer 5	boxscore	Pts: Chiang Yu-An, Deguara 22; Rebs: Deguara 18; Asts: Chiang Yu-An 7	Arena: University of Taipei Tianmu Campus Gymnasium; Attendance: 0

April 5, 2022 Regular #76	Taoyuan Leopards	88–120	TaiwanBeer HeroBears	Taipei City
14:00 (UTC+8)	Scoring by quarter: 23–30, 23–36, 29–31, 13–23
	Pts: Thomas 35; Rebs: Davis 12; Asts: Thomas 5	boxscore	Pts: Stone 24; Rebs: Deguara 13; Asts: Chiang Yu-An, Lamb 6	Arena: University of Taipei Tianmu Campus Gymnasium; Attendance: 0

=== Matchweek 20 ===
April 9, 2022 Regular #77	Taoyuan Leopards	121–139	New Taipei CTBC DEA	New Taipei City
15:00 (UTC+8)	Scoring by quarter: 26–38, 34–30, 20–25, 41–46
	Pts: Gillon 39; Rebs: Davis 12; Asts: Gillon 17	boxscore	Pts: Epps 41; Rebs: Johnson 21; Asts: Lin Wei-Han 16	Arena: Xinzhuang Gymnasium

April 9, 2022 Regular #78	Taichung Wagor Suns	118–119(OT)	TaiwanBeer HeroBears	Taipei City
17:30 (UTC+8)	Scoring by quarter: 21–27, 30–29, 27–31, 29–20, Overtime: 11–12
	Pts: Tucker 38; Rebs: Sakakini 12; Asts: Tucker 9	boxscore	Pts: Stone 35; Rebs: Deguara, Stone 17; Asts: Chiang Yu-An 12	Arena: University of Taipei Tianmu Campus Gymnasium; Attendance: 0

April 10, 2022 Regular #79	Kaohsiung Aquas	123–92	New Taipei CTBC DEA	New Taipei City
15:00 (UTC+8)	Scoring by quarter: 43–24, 27–33, 26–13, 27–22
	Pts: Kupšas 22; Rebs: Kupšas 14; Asts: Brickman 14	boxscore	Pts: Epps 26; Rebs: Epps 9 Asts: Lin Wei-Han 6	Arena: Xinzhuang Gymnasium

April 10, 2022 Regular #80	Tainan TSG GhostHawks	122–109	TaiwanBeer HeroBears	Taipei City
17:30 (UTC+8)	Scoring by quarter: 29–31, 28–34, 33–27, 32–17
	Pts: García 29; Rebs: Artino 13; Asts: García 10	boxscore	Pts: Lamb 21; Rebs: Stone 8 Asts: Lamb 8	Arena: University of Taipei Tianmu Campus Gymnasium; Attendance: 0

=== Matchweek 21 ===
April 16, 2022 Regular #81	Tainan TSG GhostHawks	81–100	Kaohsiung Aquas	Kaohsiung City
15:00 (UTC+8)	Scoring by quarter: 22–27, 15–23, 19–18, 25–32
	Pts: García 26; Rebs: Artino 18; Asts: García 6	boxscore	Pts: Kupšas 23; Rebs: Kupšas 8 Asts: Brickman 13	Arena: Kaohsiung Arena

April 16, 2022 Regular #82	New Taipei CTBC DEA	99–109	Taichung Wagor Suns	Taichung City
17:30 (UTC+8)	Scoring by quarter: 27–21, 27–31, 21–33, 24–24
	Pts: Lin Ping-Sheng 28; Rebs: Epps 13; Asts: Lin Wei-Han 12	boxscore	Pts: Sakakini 25; Rebs: Sakakini 13; Asts: Tucker 10	Arena: National Taiwan University of Sport Gymnasium

April 17, 2022 Regular #83	Taoyuan Leopards	104–119	Kaohsiung Aquas	Kaohsiung City
15:00 (UTC+8)	Scoring by quarter: 21–31, 17–28, 35–32, 31–28
	Pts: Williams 35; Rebs: Williams, Thomas 10; Asts: Williams 7	boxscore	Pts: Hall 31; Rebs: Alexander 13; Asts: Brickman 16	Arena: Kaohsiung Arena

April 17, 2022 Regular #84	Tainan TSG GhostHawks	101–126	Taichung Wagor Suns	Taichung City
17:30 (UTC+8)	Scoring by quarter: 29–34, 23–30, 28–33, 21–29
	Pts: Lu Chi-Erh 22; Rebs: Prosper 11; Asts: Gilbert, Lu Chi-Erh 5	boxscore	Pts: Sakakini 29; Rebs: Geramipoor 10; Asts: Tucker 6	Arena: National Taiwan University of Sport Gymnasium

=== Matchweek 22 ===
April 23, 2022 Regular #85	TaiwanBeer HeroBears	134–135	Taoyuan Leopards	Taipei City
15:00 (UTC+8)	Scoring by quarter: 30–31, 27–33, 35–41, 42–30
	Pts: Stone 50; Rebs: Deguara 25; Asts: Chiang Yu-An 6	boxscore	Pts: Williams, Gillon 30; Rebs: Thomas 11; Asts: Gillon 14	Arena: Taipei Heping Basketball Gymnasium

April 23, 2022 Regular #86	Kaohsiung Aquas	76–91	Tainan TSG GhostHawks	Tainan City
17:30 (UTC+8)	Scoring by quarter: 19–20, 21–30, 24–23, 12–18
	Pts: Brickman 29; Rebs: Alexander 13; Asts: Brickman 4	boxscore	Pts: Lu Chi-Erh 21; Rebs: Artino 25; Asts: Artino 9	Arena: Chia Nan University of Pharmacy and Science Shao Tsung Gymnasium

April 24, 2022 Regular #87	New Taipei CTBC DEA	132–119	Taoyuan Leopards	Taipei City
15:00 (UTC+8)	Scoring by quarter: 28–38, 46–35, 27–27, 31–19
	Pts: Johnson 30; Rebs: Johnson 16; Asts: Scharer 10	boxscore	Pts: Williams 30; Rebs: Tsai Yang-Ming 9 Asts: Gillon 7	Arena: Taipei Heping Basketball Gymnasium

April 24, 2022 Regular #88	Taichung Wagor Suns	119–111	Tainan TSG GhostHawks	Tainan City
17:30 (UTC+8)	Scoring by quarter: 32–22, 25–35, 29–20, 33–34
	Pts: Heading 44; Rebs: Sakakini, Su Yi-Chin 12; Asts: Tucker 11	boxscore	Pts: Artino 30; Rebs: Artino 12; Asts: García 7	Arena: Chia Nan University of Pharmacy and Science Shao Tsung Gymnasium

=== Matchweek 23 ===
April 29, 2022 Regular #39	Taichung Wagor Suns	112–97	Taoyuan Leopards	Taoyuan City
19:00 (UTC+8)	Scoring by quarter: 20–23, 25–26, 38–26, 29–22
	Pts: Sakakini 20; Rebs: Sakakini 19; Asts: Tucker 7	boxscore	Pts: Williams 24; Rebs: Davis 14; Asts: Gillon 7	Arena: Chung Yuan Christian University Gymnasium

April 30, 2022 Regular #89	Tainan TSG GhostHawks	101–133	New Taipei CTBC DEA	New Taipei City
14:00 (UTC+8)	Scoring by quarter: 26–30, 26–32, 21–40, 28–31
	Pts: Artino 33; Rebs: García 15; Asts: García 6	boxscore	Pts: Allen 26; Rebs: Allen 12; Asts: Scharer 11	Arena: Xinzhuang Gymnasium

Postponed (Note: The match, originally scheduled for April 30, 2022, was postponed to May 6, 2022 due to the player of the TaiwanBeer HeroBears tested positive.) Regular #35	TaiwanBeer HeroBears	vs.	Taoyuan Leopards	Taoyuan City
		boxscore		Arena: Chung Yuan Christian University Gymnasium

May 1, 2022 Regular #90	Taichung Wagor Suns	106–110	New Taipei CTBC DEA	New Taipei City
15:00 (UTC+8)	Scoring by quarter: 27–23, 29–21, 21–30, 29–36
	Pts: Tucker 24; Rebs: Geramipoor 14; Asts: Ting Sheng-Ju 5	boxscore	Pts: Epps 27; Rebs: Epps 11; Asts: Scharer 15	Arena: Xinzhuang Gymnasium

May 1, 2022 Regular #38	Kaohsiung Aquas	137–117	Taoyuan Leopards	Taoyuan City
17:30 (UTC+8)	Scoring by quarter: 25–27, 39–31, 30–32, 43–27
	Pts: Hall 33; Rebs: Kupšas, Alexander 11; Asts: Brickman 13	boxscore	Pts: Williams 44; Rebs: Williams 14; Asts: Gillon 7	Arena: Chung Yuan Christian University Gymnasium

=== Matchweek 24 ===
Postponed (Note: The match, originally scheduled for May 6, 2022, was postponed to May 19, 2022 due to the Taoyuan Leopards could not reach the minimum player number.) Regular #35	TaiwanBeer HeroBears	vs.	Taoyuan Leopards
		boxscore

Postponed (Note: The match, originally scheduled for May 7, 2022, was postponed to May 18, 2022 due to the TaiwanBeer HeroBears could not reach the minimum player number.) Regular #29	Tainan TSG GhostHawks	vs.	TaiwanBeer HeroBears	Taipei City
		boxscore		Arena: University of Taipei Tianmu Campus Gymnasium

Postponed (Note: The match, originally scheduled for May 7, 2022, was postponed to May 18, 2022 due to the Taoyuan Leopards could not reach the minimum player number.) Regular #72	New Taipei CTBC DEA	vs.	Taoyuan Leopards
		boxscore

Postponed (Note: The match, originally scheduled for May 8, 2022, was postponed to May 20, 2022 due to the TaiwanBeer HeroBears could not reach the minimum player number.) Regular #31	Kaohsiung Aquas	vs.	TaiwanBeer HeroBears	Taipei City
		boxscore		Arena: University of Taipei Tianmu Campus Gymnasium

Postponed (Note: The match, originally scheduled for May 8, 2022, was postponed to May 20, 2022 due to the Taoyuan Leopards could not reach the minimum player number.) Regular #74	Taichung Wagor Suns	vs.	Taoyuan Leopards
		boxscore

=== Matchweek 25 ===
May 18, 2022 Regular #29	Tainan TSG GhostHawks	115–144	TaiwanBeer HeroBears	Taipei City
16:00 (UTC+8)	Scoring by quarter: 30–38, 34–37, 29–39, 22–30
	Pts: Chatman 44; Rebs: Gilbert 10; Asts: three players 4	boxscore	Pts: Stone 52; Rebs: Delph 20; Asts: Chiang Yu-An 9	Arena: University of Taipei Tianmu Campus Gymnasium

May 18, 2022 Regular #72	New Taipei CTBC DEA	124–136	Taoyuan Leopards	Taoyuan City
19:00 (UTC+8)	Scoring by quarter: 36–38, 23–29, 36–32, 29–37
	Pts: Epps 29; Rebs: Johnson, Epps 10; Asts: Lin Wei-Han 8	boxscore	Pts: Williams 50; Rebs: Davis 18; Asts: Gillon 9	Arena: Taoyuan Arena

May 19, 2022 Regular #35	TaiwanBeer HeroBears	104–110	Taoyuan Leopards	Taoyuan City
19:00 (UTC+8)	Scoring by quarter: 23–21, 21–37, 37–21, 23–31
	Pts: Lamb 32; Rebs: Stone 13; Asts: Chiang Yu-An 9	boxscore	Pts: Davis, Gillon 23; Rebs: Davis 13; Asts: Gillon 14	Arena: Taoyuan Arena

May 20, 2022 Regular #31	Kaohsiung Aquas	124–107	TaiwanBeer HeroBears	Taipei City
16:00 (UTC+8)	Scoring by quarter: 37–27, 35–28, 31–28, 21–24
	Pts: Kupšas 36; Rebs: Kupšas 14; Asts: Brickman 21	boxscore	Pts: Delph 36; Rebs: Delph 14; Asts: Lamb, Fan Shih-En 4	Arena: University of Taipei Tianmu Campus Gymnasium

May 20, 2022 Regular #74	Taichung Wagor Suns	127–125(OT)	Taoyuan Leopards	Taoyuan City
19:00 (UTC+8)	Scoring by quarter: 23–26, 29–24, 27–33, 33–29, Overtime: 15–13
	Pts: Tucker 44; Rebs: Sakakini 15; Asts: three players 4	boxscore	Pts: Williams 37; Rebs: Williams 17; Asts: Gillon 9	Arena: Taoyuan Arena

== Awards ==
=== Yearly awards ===
2021–22 T1 League awards
Award	Recipient	Team	Ref.
Most Valuable Player	Chiang Yu-An	TaiwanBeer HeroBears	
Most Valuable Import	Jason Brickman	Kaohsiung Aquas	
Most Famous Player of the Year	Wei Chia-Hao	New Taipei CTBC DEA	
Best Home-Court of the Year	New Taipei CTBC DEA		
Defensive Player of the Year	Lin Ping-Sheng	New Taipei CTBC DEA	
Rookie of the Year	Mohammad Al Bachir Gadiaga	New Taipei CTBC DEA	
Sixth Man of the Year	Anthony Tucker	Taichung Wagor Suns	
Coach of the Year	Brendan Joyce	Kaohsiung Aquas	
General Manager of the Year	Li Wei-Cheng	Kaohsiung Aquas	
Referees of the Year	Wu Chien-Wu		
Referees of the Year	Lin Chien-Hung		
Referees of the Year	Yu Jung		

- All-T1 League First Team:
  - Hu Long-Mao (Kaohsiung Aquas)
  - Jason Brickman (Kaohsiung Aquas)
  - Chiang Yu-An (TaiwanBeer HeroBears)
  - Sani Sakakini (Taichung Wagor Suns)
  - Mohammad Al Bachir Gadiaga (New Taipei CTBC DEA)
- All-Defensive First Team:
  - Chiang Yu-An (TaiwanBeer HeroBears)
  - Hu Long-Mao (Kaohsiung Aquas)
  - Lin Ping-Sheng (New Taipei CTBC DEA)
  - Mindaugas Kupšas (Kaohsiung Aquas)
  - Deyonta Davis (Taoyuan Leopards)

=== Statistical awards ===
2021–22 T1 League statistical awards
Award	Recipient	Team	Statistic	Ref.
Points Leader	Diamond Stone	TaiwanBeer HeroBears	27.5	
Rebounds Leader	William Artino	Tainan TSG GhostHawks	15.8	
Assists Leader	Jason Brickman	Kaohsiung Aquas	10.3	
Steals Leader	Lin Ping-Sheng	New Taipei CTBC DEA	3.0	
Blocks Leader	Deyonta Davis	Taoyuan Leopards	2.5	

=== MVP of the Month ===
MVP of the Month awards were only for local players.

Month	Recipient	Team	Ref.
2021
December	Chiang Yu-An	TaiwanBeer HeroBears	
2022
January	Mohammad Al Bachir Gadiaga	New Taipei CTBC DEA	
February	Chiang Yu-An	TaiwanBeer HeroBears	
March	Chen Ching-Huan	Taichung Wagor Suns	
April & May	Lin Ping-Sheng	New Taipei CTBC DEA	

=== Import of the Month ===
Import of the Month awards were only for import players and type-III players.

Month	Recipient	Team	Ref.
2021
December	Jason Brickman	Kaohsiung Aquas	
2022
January	Sani Sakakini	Taichung Wagor Suns	
February	Mindaugas Kupšas	Kaohsiung Aquas	
March	Sani Sakakini	Taichung Wagor Suns	
April & May	Troy Williams	Taoyuan Leopards	

== See also ==
- 2021–22 Kaohsiung Aquas season
- 2021–22 New Taipei CTBC DEA season
- 2021–22 Taichung Wagor Suns season
- 2021–22 Tainan TSG GhostHawks season
- 2021–22 TaiwanBeer HeroBears season
- 2021–22 Taoyuan Leopards season
