= Tainan TSG GhostHawks all-time roster =

The following is a list of players, both past and current, who appeared at least in one game for the Tainan TSG GhostHawks (2021–present) franchise.

== Players ==
Note: Statistics are correct through the end of the 2023–24 T1 League season.

G	Guard	PG	Point guard	SG	Shooting guard	F	Forward	SF	Small forward	PF	Power forward	C	Center

^{*}	Denotes player who has been selected for at least one All-Star Game and is currently on the Tainan TSG GhostHawks roster
^{+}	Denotes player who has been selected for at least one All-Star Game with the Tainan TSG GhostHawks
^{x}	Denotes player who is currently on the Tainan TSG GhostHawks roster
0.0	Denotes the Tainan TSG GhostHawks statistics leader

=== A ===
Player	Name	Nat.	Pos.	From	Yrs	Seasons	Statistics									Ref.
Player	Name	Nat.	Pos.	From	Yrs	Seasons	GP	MP	PTS	REB	AST	MPG	PPG	RPG	APG	Ref.
William Artino	阿提諾	(United States) (Taiwan)	C	Creighton	1	2021–2022	18	756:17	477	284	58	42:00	26.5	15.8	3.2	

=== B ===
Player	Name	Nat.	Pos.	From	Yrs	Seasons	Statistics									Ref.
Player	Name	Nat.	Pos.	From	Yrs	Seasons	GP	MP	PTS	REB	AST	MPG	PPG	RPG	APG	Ref.
Sedrick Barefield	貝爾飛特	(Philippines) (United States)	SG	University of Utah	1	2022–2023	1	3:04	0	1	0	3:04	0.0	1.0	0.0	
Sim Bhullar	布拉	(Canada)	C	New Mexico State University	2	2022–2024	30	945:29	533	362	48	31:30	17.8	12.1	1.6	
Milko Bjelica	米可	(Montenegro) (Serbia)	C	Serbia	1	2023–2024	15	395:47	203	92	18	26:23	13.5	6.1	1.2	
Taylor Braun	布朗	(United States)	SF	North Dakota State University	1	2022–2023	7	230:01	79	41	27	32:51	11.3	5.9	3.9	
De'Mon Brooks^{x}	翟蒙	(United States)	F	Davidson College	1	2024–present										

=== C ===
Player	Name	Nat.	Pos.	From	Yrs	Seasons	Statistics									Ref.
Player	Name	Nat.	Pos.	From	Yrs	Seasons	GP	MP	PTS	REB	AST	MPG	PPG	RPG	APG	Ref.
Chang Chia-Jung	張家榮	(Taiwan)	SF	HWU	1	2021–2022	17	228:33	50	30	12	13:26	2.9	1.8	0.7	
Chang Chih-Hao^{x}	張志豪	(Taiwan)	G	NTUS	1	2024–present										
Chang Po-Sheng^{x}	張博勝	(Taiwan)	G	NTUA	1	2023–present	11	62:50	25	5	3	5:42	2.3	0.5	0.3	
Chang Wei-Hsiang	張幃翔	(Taiwan)	SF	NTUA	2	2021–2023	30	627:19	170	77	24	20:54	5.7	2.6	0.8	
Jordan Chatman	喬登	(United States)	SG	Boston College	1	2021–2022	21	667:48	376	98	42	31:48	17.9	4.7	2.0	
Chen Ching-Huan	陳靖寰	(Taiwan)	F	FJU	2	2022–2024	16	409:18	59	41	43	25:35	3.7	2.6	2.7	
Chiang Chiao-An	蔣喬安	(Taiwan)	SG	UCH	1	2021–2022	22	238:29	41	11	15	10:50	1.9	0.5	0.7	
Chien Wei-Ju^{+}	簡偉儒	(Taiwan)	SG	NTNU	2	2022–2024	53	1304:13	414	144	110	24:36	7.8	2.7	2.1	
Ethan Chung^{x}	种義仁	(United States) (Taiwan)	G	Pacific University	1	2024–present										

=== D ===
Player	Name	Nat.	Pos.	From	Yrs	Seasons	Statistics									Ref.
Player	Name	Nat.	Pos.	From	Yrs	Seasons	GP	MP	PTS	REB	AST	MPG	PPG	RPG	APG	Ref.
Shaheed Davis	小戴	(United States)	F	University of Central Florida	1	2022–2023	1	12:58	5	4	2	12:58	5.0	4.0	2.0	
Samuel Deguara	德古拉	(Malta) (Italy)	C	Malta	2	2022–2024	37	1103:00	679	408	38	29:49	18.4	11.0	1.0	
Bayasgalan Delgerchuluun^{x}	白薩	(Mongolia)	G	HungKuo Delin University of Technology	2	2023–present	22	528:48	176	44	45	24:02	8.0	2.0	2.0	
Žiga Dimec^{x}	赤崁	(Slovenia)	C	Slovenia	1	2024–present										

=== F ===
Player	Name	Nat.	Pos.	From	Yrs	Seasons	Statistics									Ref.
Player	Name	Nat.	Pos.	From	Yrs	Seasons	GP	MP	PTS	REB	AST	MPG	PPG	RPG	APG	Ref.
Nick Faust	飛斯特	(United States)	G/F	Long Beach State	1	2022–2023	3	50:39	39	11	11	16:53	13.0	3.7	3.7	
Branden Frazier^{x}	飛雷神	(United States)	G	Fordham University	1	2024–present										

=== G ===
Player	Name	Nat.	Pos.	From	Yrs	Seasons	Statistics									Ref.
Player	Name	Nat.	Pos.	From	Yrs	Seasons	GP	MP	PTS	REB	AST	MPG	PPG	RPG	APG	Ref.
Charles García	賈西亞	(Belize) (United States)	PF	Seattle	1	2021–2022	26	858:45	569	248	103	33:01	21.9	9.5	4.0	
Marcus Gilbert	吉伯特	(United States)	SF	Fairfield	1	2021–2022	19	599:48	336	121	48	31:34	17.7	6.4	2.5	
Eric Griffin	葛瑞飛	(United States)	PF	Campbell	1	2023–2024	3	60:29	32	14	6	20:09	10.7	4.7	2.0	

=== H ===
Player	Name	Nat.	Pos.	From	Yrs	Seasons	Statistics									Ref.
Player	Name	Nat.	Pos.	From	Yrs	Seasons	GP	MP	PTS	REB	AST	MPG	PPG	RPG	APG	Ref.
Han Chieh-Yu^{x}	韓杰諭	(Taiwan)	F	National Taiwan Sport University	2	2022–present	26	281:33	92	39	10	10:49	3.5	1.5	0.4	
Hu Kai-Hsiang^{x}	胡凱翔	(Taiwan)	SF	Chinese Culture University	2	2022–present	44	1129:47	357	135	160	25:40	8.1	3.1	3.6	
Hsieh Zong-Rong^{x}	謝宗融	(Taiwan)	C	National Taiwan University of Science and Technology	1	2024–present										
Huang Tsung-Han	黃宗翰	(Taiwan)	PF	National Taiwan Normal University	1	2021–2022	5	13:53	1	6	0	2:46	0.2	1.2	0.0	

=== K ===
Player	Name	Nat.	Pos.	From	Yrs	Seasons	Statistics									Ref.
Player	Name	Nat.	Pos.	From	Yrs	Seasons	GP	MP	PTS	REB	AST	MPG	PPG	RPG	APG	Ref.
Kao Cheng-En	高承恩	(Taiwan)	G	UCH	1	2023–2024	3	27:26	11	3	5	9:08	3.7	1.0	1.7	
Kao Kuo-Chiang	高國強	(Taiwan)	PG	SHU	1	2021–2022	19	194:09	40	23	27	10:13	2.1	1.2	1.4	
Nick King	金恩	(United States)	F	Middle Tennessee	1	2023–2024	22	907:45	533	227	126	41:15	24.2	10.3	5.7	
Ku Mao Wei-Chia^{*}	谷毛唯嘉	(Taiwan)	PG	UCH	2	2022–present	52	1307:04	592	114	216	25:08	11.4	2.2	4.2	
Kuo Shao-Chieh^{x}	郭少傑	(Taiwan)	F	TNU	1	2023–present	24	427:35	147	45	22	17:48	6.1	1.9	0.9	

=== L ===
Player	Name	Nat.	Pos.	From	Yrs	Seasons	Statistics									Ref.
Player	Name	Nat.	Pos.	From	Yrs	Seasons	GP	MP	PTS	REB	AST	MPG	PPG	RPG	APG	Ref.
Lan Shao-Fu	藍少甫	(Taiwan)	F	NTSU	1	2023–2024	5	56:21	16	10	3	11:16	3.2	2.0	0.6	
Lee Yun-Chieh^{x}	李允傑	(Taiwan)	F	NCCU	1	2024–present										
Li Han-Sheng	李漢昇	(Taiwan)	PG	NTNU	2	2022–2024	56	1454:24	458	169	256	25:58	8.2	3.0	4.6	
Oscar Lin	林冠均	(Taiwan) (Australia)	SG	UCH	1	2021–2022	13	273:52	83	16	15	21:04	6.4	1.2	1.2	
Lin Tzu-Feng	林梓峰	(Taiwan)	SG	UCH	2	2021–2023	6	24:02	6	7	2	4:00	1.0	1.2	0.3	
Liu Chun-Ting^{x}	劉駿霆	(Taiwan)	SF	MU	3	2021–2023; 2024–present	32	492:10	125	68	34	15:22	3.9	2.1	1.1	
Liu Jen-Hao	劉人豪	(Taiwan)	PG	UCH	1	2021–2022	20	651:59	112	82	81	32:35	5.6	4.1	4.1	
Lu Chi-Erh	呂濟而	(Taiwan)	G	NKNU	2	2021–2022; 2023–2024	35	800:28	246	80	52	22:52	7.0	2.3	1.5	
Lu Kuan-Ting^{x}	呂冠霆	(Taiwan)	F	NTUA	2	2022–present	35	373:23	147	44	31	10:40	4.2	1.3	0.9	
Lung Hung-Yuan	龍弘元	(Taiwan)	C	CCU	1	2021–2022	23	289:31	77	62	15	12:35	3.3	2.7	0.7	

=== M ===
Player	Name	Nat.	Pos.	From	Yrs	Seasons	Statistics									Ref.
Player	Name	Nat.	Pos.	From	Yrs	Seasons	GP	MP	PTS	REB	AST	MPG	PPG	RPG	APG	Ref.
Egidijus Mockevičius	鷹吉	(Lithuania)	C	Evansville	1	2023–2024	12	407:03	165	167	21	33:55	13.8	13.9	1.8	

=== P ===
Player	Name	Nat.	Pos.	From	Yrs	Seasons	Statistics									Ref.
Player	Name	Nat.	Pos.	From	Yrs	Seasons	GP	MP	PTS	REB	AST	MPG	PPG	RPG	APG	Ref.
Nick Perkins^{x}	鉑金	(United States)	F	Buffalo	1	2024–present										
Lester Prosper	雷神	(Dominican Republic) (Indonesia)	PF	Old Westbury	1	2021–2022	8	170:01	84	50	6	21:15	10.5	6.3	0.8	

=== R ===
Player	Name	Nat.	Pos.	From	Yrs	Seasons	Statistics									Ref.
Player	Name	Nat.	Pos.	From	Yrs	Seasons	GP	MP	PTS	REB	AST	MPG	PPG	RPG	APG	Ref.
Willie Reed	威力	(United States)	F	Saint Louis	1	2023–2024	1	13:25	7	6	0	13:25	7.0	6.0	0.0	
King Revolution	鷹皇	(United States)	PF	Southern	1	2021–2022	2	60:51	34	20	3	30:25	17.0	10.0	1.5	

=== S ===
Player	Name	Nat.	Pos.	From	Yrs	Seasons	Statistics									Ref.
Player	Name	Nat.	Pos.	From	Yrs	Seasons	GP	MP	PTS	REB	AST	MPG	PPG	RPG	APG	Ref.
Su Yi-Chin	蘇奕晉	(Taiwan)	PF	MDU	1	2023–2024	20	331:24	106	48	32	16:34	5.3	2.4	1.6	

=== T ===
Player	Name	Nat.	Pos.	From	Yrs	Seasons	Statistics									Ref.
Player	Name	Nat.	Pos.	From	Yrs	Seasons	GP	MP	PTS	REB	AST	MPG	PPG	RPG	APG	Ref.
Tsai Chien-Yu	蔡建宇	(Taiwan)	F	CKU	1	2022–2023	4	15:41	3	3	0	3:55	0.8	0.8	0.0	
Tsai Yao-Hsun	蔡耀勛	(Taiwan)	SF	TPEC	1	2021–2022	17	369:23	112	33	25	21:43	6.6	1.9	1.5	
Tseng Pin-Fu	曾品富	(Taiwan)	SF	UCH	1	2021–2022	15	136:42	20	21	4	9:06	1.3	1.4	0.3	

=== U ===
Player	Name	Nat.	Pos.	From	Yrs	Seasons	Statistics									Ref.
Player	Name	Nat.	Pos.	From	Yrs	Seasons	GP	MP	PTS	REB	AST	MPG	PPG	RPG	APG	Ref.
Robert Upshaw^{+}	阿修羅	(United States)	C	Washington	2	2022–2024	26	879:51	546	304	82	33:51	21.0	11.7	3.2	

=== V ===
Player	Name	Nat.	Pos.	From	Yrs	Seasons	Statistics									Ref.
Player	Name	Nat.	Pos.	From	Yrs	Seasons	GP	MP	PTS	REB	AST	MPG	PPG	RPG	APG	Ref.
Domagoj Vuković^{x}	武科維奇	(Croatia)	PF	Croatia	1	2023–present	9	271:31	130	91	22	30:10	14.4	10.1	2.4	

=== W ===
Player	Name	Nat.	Pos.	From	Yrs	Seasons	Statistics									Ref.
Player	Name	Nat.	Pos.	From	Yrs	Seasons	GP	MP	PTS	REB	AST	MPG	PPG	RPG	APG	Ref.
Marcus Weathers	威樂斯	(United States)	SF	SMU	1	2022–2023	4	101:02	71	32	5	25:15	17.8	8.0	1.3	
Negus Webster-Chan	陳內斯	(Canada)	SF	Hawaiʻi	1	2021–2022	7	143:14	66	31	18	20:28	9.4	4.4	2.6	
Wu Hung-Hsing	吳宏興	(Taiwan)	C	SRHS	2	2022–2024	26	120:38	25	26	5	4:38	1.0	1.0	0.2	
Wu Tai-Hao^{x}	吳岱豪	(Taiwan)	C	BYU-Hawaii	3	2022–present	22	211:07	23	34	16	9:36	1.0	1.5	0.7	
Wu Yen-Lun	吳彥侖	(Taiwan)	G	ISU	2	2022–2024	13	174:04	51	30	25	13:23	3.9	2.3	1.9	
