= List of Tainan TSG GhostHawks head coaches =

The Tainan TSG GhostHawks are a Taiwanese professional basketball team based in Tainan City, Taiwan. The team is owned by Taiwan Steel Group and coached by Raoul Korner. The GhostHawks were founded in 2021 and won 0 T1 League championship.

There have been 5 head coaches for the Tainan TSG GhostHawks franchise and haven't won any T1 League championship.

== Key ==
GC	Games coached
W	Wins
L	Losses
Win%	Winning percentage
#	Number of coaches

== Coaches ==
Note: Statistics are correct through the end of the 2023–24 T1 League season.

#	Name	Term	GC	W	L	Win%	GC	W	L	Win%	Achievements
#	Name	Term	Regular season				Playoffs				Achievements
Tainan TSG GhostHawks
1	Wu Chih-Wei	2021–2022	21	4	17	.190	–	–	–	–	
2	Liu Meng-Chu	2021–2024	48	23	25	.479	9	3	6	.333	
3	Ma I-Hung	2022–2023	2	1	1	.500	–	–	–	–	First female head coach in Taiwanese professional basketball history
4	Lin Yu-Cheng	2023–2024	3	0	3	.000	–	–	–	–	
5	Raoul Korner	2023–present	14	4	10	.286	–	–	–	–	
