= List of 2023–24 T1 League transactions =

This is a list of transactions that took place during the 2023 T1 League off-season and the 2023–24 T1 League season.

== Retirement ==
Date	Name	Team(s) played (years)	Age	Notes	Ref.
April 16	Lung Hung-Yuan	Tainan TSG GhostHawks (2021–2022)	34	Also played in the SBL. Hired as center coach by the National Formosa University basketball team.	
November 4	Peng Chun-Yen	Taichung Suns (2022–2023)	33	Also played in the SBL, PLG, and overseas. Hired as assistant coach by the Dalun Junior High School basketball team.	

== Front office movements ==
=== Head coaching changes ===
Off-season

Departure date	Team	Outgoing head coach	Reason for departure	Hire date	Incoming head coach	Last coaching position	Ref.
June 26	TaiwanBeer HeroBears	Yang Chih-Hao	Team folded	—N/a	—N/a	—N/a	
June 29	Taichung Suns	Chris Gavina	Left the team	July 1	Anthony Tucker	—N/a	
August 14	TaiwanBeer Leopards	John Bennett	—N/a	August 14	Michael Olson	Tokyo Hachioji Bee Trains associate coach (2018–2019)	
—N/a	Taipei Taishin Mars	—N/a	—N/a	September 14	Brian Adams	Philadelphia 76ers assistant coach (2020–2023)	
October 13	Taichung Suns	Anthony Tucker	Left the team	—N/a	—N/a	—N/a	

In-season

Departure date	Team	Outgoing head coach	Reason for departure	Hire date	Incoming head coach	Last coaching position	Ref.
December 31	Taipei Mars	Brian Adams	Resigned	January 3	Hsu Hao-Cheng (interim)	Taipei Mars assistant coach (2023)	
January 9	Tainan TSG GhostHawks	Liu Meng-Chu	Resigned	January 9	Lin Yu-Cheng (interim)	Tainan TSG GhostHawks assistant coach (2023–2024)	
January 13	Taiwan Beer Leopards	Michael Olson	Contract terminated	January 13	Chou Chun-San (interim)	Taiwan Beer head coach (2017–2023)	
January 29	Tainan TSG GhostHawks	Lin Yu-Cheng (interim)	Interim	January 29	Raoul Korner	Hamburg Towers head coach (2022–2023)	
February 15	Taiwan Beer Leopards	Chou Chun-San (interim)	Interim	February 15	Charles Dubé-Brais	Taiwan Beer Leopards assistant coach (2024)	

=== General manager changes ===
Off-season

Departure date	Team	Outgoing general manager	Reason for departure	Hire date	Incoming general manager	Last managerial position	Ref.
June 26	TaiwanBeer HeroBears	Ha Hsiao-Yuan	Team folded	—N/a	—N/a	—N/a	
—N/a	Taipei Taishin Mars	—N/a	—N/a	July 14	Lin You-Ting	—N/a	
October 16	Taichung Suns	Wang Wei-Chieh	Team folded	—N/a	—N/a	—N/a	
—N/a	Taiwan Beer Leopards	Chang Chien-Wei (interim)	Interim	—N/a	—N/a	—N/a	

== Player movements ==
=== Trades ===
July
July 12	To Taipei Taishin basketball team: Huang Tsung-Han; 2024 Leopards' first-round pick	To TaiwanBeer Leopards: 2023 Taishin's first-round 2nd pick
July 12	To Taichung Suns: 2023 Taishin's second-round 3rd pick; 2024 Taishin's second-round pick	To Taipei Taishin basketball team: 2023 Suns' first-round pick

=== Free agents ===
Player	Date signed	New team	Former team	Ref.
Edgaras Želionis	June 21	New Taipei CTBC DEA		
Chiang Yu-An	July 4	TaiwanBeer Leopards	Anhui Wenyi (China)	
Lee Chi-Wei	July 4	TaiwanBeer Leopards	TaiwanBeer HeroBears (Team folded)	
Huang Jhen	July 4	TaiwanBeer Leopards	TaiwanBeer HeroBears (Team folded)	
Yang Cheng-Han	July 6	Taichung Suns		
Su Po-Chang	July 8	Taichung Suns	Taiwan Beer (Super Basketball League)	
Tseng Pin-Fu	July 10	Taichung Suns	Taoyuan Leopards	
Ting Sheng-Ju	July 14	Taipei Taishin	Taichung Suns (Waived on July 3)	
Lin Yi-Huei	July 14	Taipei Taishin	Taoyuan Leopards	
Chen Wen-Hung	July 14	Taipei Taishin	Taichung Suns (Waived on July 4)	
Chang Keng-Yu	July 14	Taipei Taishin	Taipei Fubon Braves (P. League+)	
Tsao Xun-Xiang	July 14	Taipei Taishin	TaiwanBeer HeroBears (Team folded)	
Wu Yen-Lun	July 17	Tainan TSG GhostHawks		
Deyonta Davis	July 17	Taichung Suns	Taoyuan Leopards	
Robert Upshaw	July 24	Tainan TSG GhostHawks	Shaanxi Wolves (China)	
Kristijan Krajina	July 24	New Taipei CTBC DEA		
Viktor Gaddefors	July 28	New Taipei CTBC DEA	Donar Groningen (Netherlands)	
Nuni Omot	July 30	Taichung Suns	Al Ahly (Egypt)	
Chang Po-Sheng	August 1	Tainan TSG GhostHawks	Bank of Taiwan (Super Basketball League)	
Huang Hung-Han	August 1	New Taipei CTBC DEA	Taoyuan Pauian Pilots (P. League+)	
Joof Alasan	August 4	TaiwanBeer Leopards	NTUA	
Nick King	August 5	Tainan TSG GhostHawks	New Taipei CTBC DEA	
Jason Brickman	August 5	Kaohsiung Aquas		
Mindaugas Kupšas	August 6	Kaohsiung Aquas		
Sim Bhullar	August 7	Tainan TSG GhostHawks		
Lan Shao-Fu	August 8	Taichung Suns	Kaohsiung 17LIVE Steelers (P. League+)	
Aaron Geramipoor	August 10	Kaohsiung Aquas	Taichung Suns	
Perry Jones	August 11	Kaohsiung Aquas	Capitanes de Arecibo (Puerto Rico)	
Kao Cheng-En	August 11	Tainan TSG GhostHawks	New Taipei Kings (P. League+, Undrafted in 2022)	
Davion Warren	August 16	Taichung Suns	Rayos de Hermosillo (Mexico)	
Lin Ping-Sheng	August 16	Taipei Taishin	New Taipei CTBC DEA	
Kuo Shao-Chieh	August 21	Tainan TSG GhostHawks	Hsinchu JKO Lioneers (P. League+)	
Sun Szu-Yao	August 24	Taipei Taishin Mars	Kaohsiung 17LIVE Steelers (P. League+)	
Hsu Ching-En	August 24	Taipei Taishin Mars	NTNU (Undrafted in 2023)	
Liu Yen-Ting	August 24	Taipei Taishin Mars	OCU (Undrafted in 2023)	
Lin Li	August 24	Taipei Taishin Mars	NCCU (Undrafted in 2023)	
Wu Siao-Jin	August 24	Kaohsiung Aquas		
Dragan Zeković	August 25	New Taipei CTBC DEA	BC CSKA Sofia (Bulgaria)	
Chin Ming-Ching	August 27	Kaohsiung Aquas		
Wu Tai-Hao	August 28	Tainan TSG GhostHawks		
Wu I-Ping	August 29	Kaohsiung Aquas		
Justyn Hamilton	September 1	TaiwanBeer Leopards	Lugano Tigers (Switzerland)	
Samuel Deguara	September 8	Tainan TSG GhostHawks	Hong Kong Bulls (China)	
Erik McCree	September 14	Taipei Taishin Mars	Magnolia Hotshots (Philippines)	
Jaylen Johnson	September 14	Taipei Taishin Mars	Nacional (Uruguay)	
Lasan Kromah	September 26	TaiwanBeer Leopards	Baloncesto Fuenlabrada (Spain)	
Matt Mobley	October 6	Taipei Mars	JDA Dijon Basket (France)	
Devin Williams	October 7	TaiwanBeer Leopards	Jiangsu Dragons (China)	
Su Yi-Chin	October 18	Tainan TSG GhostHawks	Taichung Suns (Team folded)	
Lan Shao-Fu	October 18	Tainan TSG GhostHawks	Taichung Suns (Team folded)	
Delgerchuluun Bayasgalan (SFS)	October 18	Tainan TSG GhostHawks	Taichung Suns (Team folded)	
Youssou Ndoye	October 18	Taipei Mars	Covirán Granada (Spain)	
Chu I-Tsung	November 10	Taiwan Beer Leopards	Taiwan Beer (Super Basketball League)	
Danny Pippen	November 17	Taipei Mars	CS Maristes (Lebanon)	
Eric Griffin	November 22	Tainan TSG GhostHawks	Hapoel Eilat (Israel)	
Daniel Johnson	December 8	Taiwan Beer Leopards	South East Melbourne Phoenix (Australia)	
Wu Pei-Chia	December 16	Taiwan Beer Leopards	Taiwan Beer (Super Basketball League, Undrafted in 2023)	
DeMarcus Cousins	December 18	Taiwan Beer Leopards	Mets de Guaynabo (Puerto Rico)	
Milko Bjelica	January 5	Tainan TSG GhostHawks	NSA Lebanon (Lebanon)	
Tyran De Lattibeaudiere	January 12	New Taipei CTBC DEA	Le Mans Sarthe Basket (France)	
Vladyslav Koreniuk	January 17	Taipei Mars	Jiangxi Ganchi (China)	
Willie Reed	January 26	Tainan TSG GhostHawks	Baloncesto Fuenlabrada (Spain)	
Rahlir Hollis-Jefferson	February 6	Taipei Mars	TNT Tropang Giga (Philippines)	
Cody Demps	February 19	New Taipei CTBC DEA	Abejas de León (Mexico)	
Egidijus Mockevičius	February 21	Tainan TSG GhostHawks	Victoria Libertas Pesaro (Italy)	
Shannon Scott	March 5	Kaohsiung Aquas	Brisbane Bullets (Australia)	
Domagoj Vuković	March 7	Tainan TSG GhostHawks	Cibona (Croatia)	
DeAndre Williams	March 16	Taiwan Beer Leopards	NLEX Road Warriors (Philippines)	
DeMarcus Cousins	March 18	Taiwan Beer Leopards		
Su Yi-Chieh			Taoyuan Leopards	
Yu Chu-Hsiang			Taoyuan Leopards	
Du Yu-Cheng			Taoyuan Leopards	
Tsai Yang-Ming			Taoyuan Leopards	
Chang Shun-Cheng			Taoyuan Leopards	
Kao Shih-Chieh			Taoyuan Leopards	
Liu Hung-Po			Taoyuan Leopards	
Huang Yi-Sheng			Taoyuan Leopards	
Wen Li-Huang			Taichung Suns (Waived on August 3)	
Tsai Chien-Yu			Tainan TSG GhostHawks	
Kao Meng-Wei			Taichung Suns (Team folded)	
Lee Ming-Xiu			Taichung Suns (Team folded)	
Su Po-Chang			Taichung Suns (Team folded)	
Chen Ching-Huan			Tainan TSG GhostHawks (Waived on November 1)	

=== Going to other Taiwanese leagues ===
Player	Date signed	New team	New league	Former T1 League team	Ref.
Chou Po-Hsun	August 3	Hsinchu JKO Lioneers	P. League+	TaiwanBeer HeroBears (Team folded)	
Lin Tzu-Feng	August 7	Changhua BLL	Super Basketball League	Tainan TSG GhostHawks	
Taylor Braun	September 8	Hsinchu Lioneers	P. League+	Tainan TSG GhostHawks (Waived on December 30, 2022)	
Chu I-Tsung	September 18	Taiwan Beer	Super Basketball League	TaiwanBeer HeroBears (Team folded)	
Lu Kuan-Hsuan	November 4	Hsinchu Lioneers	P. League+	Taichung Suns (Team folded)	
Lee Hsueh-Lin	November 15	Taoyuan Pauian Pilots	P. League+	New Taipei CTBC DEA	
Michael Efevberha	November 16	Hsinchu Lioneers	P. League+	Taoyuan Leopards	
Tung Fang Yi-Kang	December 14	Yulon Luxgen Dinos	Super Basketball League	New Taipei CTBC DEA	
Yang Cheng-Han	December 14	Yulon Luxgen Dinos	Super Basketball League	Taichung Suns (Team folded)	
Lin Ming-Yi	December 14	Yulon Luxgen Dinos	Super Basketball League	Taichung Suns (Team folded)	
Wu Tai-Hao	January 4	Yulon Luxgen Dinos	Super Basketball League	Tainan TSG GhostHawks (Players communication)	
Lan Shao-Fu	January 4	Yulon Luxgen Dinos	Super Basketball League	Tainan TSG GhostHawks (Players communication)	
Kao Cheng-En	January 4	Yulon Luxgen Dinos	Super Basketball League	Tainan TSG GhostHawks (Players communication)	
Wu Yen-Lun	January 4	Yulon Luxgen Dinos	Super Basketball League	Tainan TSG GhostHawks (Players communication)	
Tseng Pin-Fu	January 12	Taiwan Beer	Super Basketball League	Taichung Suns (Team folded)	
Tung Yung-Chuan	January 12	Taiwan Beer	Super Basketball League	Taichung Suns (Team folded)	
Chen Chien-Ming	January 12	Taiwan Beer	Super Basketball League	Taoyuan Leopards	
Yang Tian-You	January 12	Taiwan Beer	Super Basketball League	TaiwanBeer HeroBears (Team folded)	
Fan Shih-En	January 12	Taiwan Beer	Super Basketball League	TaiwanBeer HeroBears (Team folded)	
Lu Tsai Yu-Lun	January 12	Taiwan Beer	Super Basketball League	Taoyuan Leopards (End of loan)	
Samuel Deguara	April 15	Taiwan Mustangs	The Asian Tournament	Tainan TSG GhostHawks (Waived on January 27)	

=== Going overseas ===
Player	Date signed	New team	New country	Former T1 League team	Ref.
Michael Qualls	May 19	Metros de Santiago	Dominican Republic	TaiwanBeer HeroBears	
Chiang Yu-An	May 28	Anhui Wenyi	China	TaiwanBeer HeroBears	
Marcus Weathers	May 31	DuBois Dream	United States	Tainan TSG GhostHawks	
Samuel Deguara	June 14	Hong Kong Bulls	China	Tainan TSG GhostHawks	
Perry Jones	June 15	Capitanes de Arecibo	Puerto Rico	TaiwanBeer HeroBears	
Keith Benson	June 16	Al Wahda SC	Syria	Taichung Suns	
Alonzo Gee	June 24	Aliens	United States	Taichung Wagor Suns	
Robert Upshaw	July 4	Shaanxi Wolves	China	Tainan TSG GhostHawks	
Tyler Lamb (III)	July 13	Hi-tech basketball club	Thailand	TaiwanBeer HeroBears	
Stephan Hicks	July 18	Fort Wayne Champs	United States	TaiwanBeer HeroBears (Waived on October 28, 2022)	
Austin Derrick	July 29	Pathum Thani Pythons	Thailand	Taichung Suns (Waived on June 30)	
Rayvonte Rice	August 21	Sagesse SC	Lebanon	Taichung Suns	
Arnett Moultrie	September 21	Qingdao Eagles	China	Taichung Suns	
Hasheem Thabeet	September 29	Pazi BBC	Tanzania	TaiwanBeer HeroBears (Team folded)	
Deyonta Davis	October 5	Goyang Sono Skygunners	South Korea	Taichung Suns (Waived on October 5)	
Liu Chun-Ting	October 11	Aomori Wat's	Japan	Tainan TSG GhostHawks	
Kaspars Bērziņš	October 13	Rīgas Zeļļi	Latvia	New Taipei CTBC DEA	
Nuni Omot	October 29	Chorale Roanne	France	Taichung Suns (Waived on October 13)	
Davion Warren	October 30	Memphis Hustle	United States	Taichung Suns (Waived on October 13)	
Adam Łapeta	October 30	PGE Spójnia Stargard	Poland	Taoyuan Leopards (Waived on March 5, 2022)	
Milenko Veljković	November 26	BC Geosan Kolín	Czech Republic	TaiwanBeer HeroBears (Waived on December 13, 2022)	
Xavier Alexander	December 7	Tangerang Hawks	Indonesia	Kaohsiung Aquas	
Eric Griffin	December 30	Hapoel Haifa	Israel	Tainan TSG GhostHawks (Waived on December 30)	
Dwight Howard	January 2	Strong Group Athletics	Philippines	Taoyuan Leopards	
Matt Mobley	January 18	SLUC Nancy Basket	France	Taipei Mars (Waived on November 10)	
Viktor Gaddefors	January 23	San Giobbe Basket	Italy	New Taipei CTBC DEA (Waived on January 12)	
Robert Upshaw	January 31	Alagöz Holding Iğdır Basketbol	Turkey	Tainan TSG GhostHawks (Waived on November 20)	
Erik McCree	February 1	Broncos de Caracas	Venezuela	Taipei Mars (Waived on February 6)	
Richard Laku	February 10	San Pedro Tiger Sharks	Belize	Taoyuan Leopards	
Tyran De Lattibeaudiere	March 7	Legia Warszawa	Poland	New Taipei CTBC DEA	
Daniel Johnson	March 22	Forestville Eagles	Australia	Taiwan Beer Leopards (Waived on March 15)	
John Bohannon	April 3	Tijuana Zonkeys	Mexico	Kaohsiung Aquas	
Derek King	April 19	VantaBlack Dragons	Hong Kong	Taichung Suns (Team folded)	
Daniel Orton	May 17	La Familia	United States	Taoyuan Leopards (Waived on December 28, 2021)	

=== Waived ===
Player	Date waived	Former team	Ref.
Austin Derrick	June 30	Taichung Suns	
Ting Sheng-Ju	July 3	Taichung Suns	
Chen Wen-Hung	July 4	Taichung Suns	
Wen Li-Huang	August 3	Taichung Suns	
Deyonta Davis	October 5	Taichung Suns	
Nuni Omot	October 13	Taichung Suns	
Davion Warren	October 13	Taichung Suns	
Lo Chen-Feng	October 24	TaiwanBeer Leopards (Permanent ban by T1 League)	
Chen Ching-Huan	November 1	Tainan TSG GhostHawks	
Matt Mobley	November 10	Taipei Mars	
Robert Upshaw	November 20	Tainan TSG GhostHawks	
Justyn Hamilton	December 28	Taiwan Beer Leopards	
Eric Griffin	December 30	Tainan TSG GhostHawks	
Viktor Gaddefors	January 12	New Taipei CTBC DEA	
Danny Pippen	January 17	Taipei Mars	
Samuel Deguara	January 27	Tainan TSG GhostHawks	
Willie Reed	February 5	Tainan TSG GhostHawks	
Erik McCree	February 6	Taipei Mars	
Daniel Johnson	March 15	Taiwan Beer Leopards	

(III): Type-III players
(SFS): Special foreign student

== Draft ==
The 2023 T1 League draft was held on July 14, 2023, at Songshan Cultural and Creative Park Warehouse 1 in Taipei City. There were 41 players participated in the draft, and 7 players were chosen in 2 rounds.

Pick	Player	Date signed	Team	Ref.
1	Lin Sin-Kuan	July 20	TaiwanBeer Leopards	
2	Gao Jin-Wei	July 20	TaiwanBeer Leopards (rights acquired from Taishin)	
3	Chang Chao-Chen	August 24	Taipei City (rights acquired from Suns)	
4	Chien Ho-Yu	—N/a	Taipei City	
5	Tang Wei-Chieh	August 4	Kaohsiung Aquas	
6	Li Pei-Cheng	August 3	New Taipei CTBC DEA	
7	Guo Zhen-Fu	—N/a	Taichung Suns (rights acquired from Taishin)	

== See also ==
- 2023–24 Kaohsiung Aquas season
- 2023–24 New Taipei CTBC DEA season
- 2023–24 Taichung Suns season
- 2023–24 Tainan TSG GhostHawks season
- 2023–24 Taipei Mars season
- 2023–24 Taiwan Beer Leopards season
