= 2024–25 TSG GhostHawks season =

Taiwanese professional basketball season

TSG GhostHawks
2024–25 season
- President: Wang Chiung-Fen
- Head Coach: Raoul Korner
- Arena: National Cheng Kung University Chung Cheng Gym

The 2024–25 TSG GhostHawks season is the franchise's 4th season, 1st season in the P. League+. The GhostHawks are coached by Raoul Korner in his second year as their head coach. On June 28, 2024, the GhostHawks announced that Chien Wei-Cheng resigned from general manager. On July 9, 2024, TSG GhostHawks announced to exit the PLG–T1 League merger and join PLG.

== Draft ==
Round	Pick	Player	Position	Status	School/club team
1	2	Lee Yun-Chieh	G	Local	NCCU
1	5	Chang Chih-Hao	G	Local	NTUS

== Roster ==
2024–25 TSG GhostHawks roster
Players
Coaches

Pos.	No.	Nat.	Name	Ht.	Wt.	Age	From
G	3	(Taiwan)	Ku Mao Wei-Chia	1.75 m (5 ft 9 in)	68 kg (150 lb)	26 – 4 December 1999	Chien Hsin Tech
F	4	(United States)	De'Mon Brooks (I)	2.01 m (6 ft 7 in)	104 kg (229 lb)	34 – 28 May 1992	Davidson
G	6	(Mongolia)	Bayasgalan Delgerchuluun (FS)	1.83 m (6 ft 0 in)	75 kg (165 lb)	28 – 30 October 1997	HDUT
G	7	(United States) (Taiwan)	Ethan Chung (HP)	1.87 m (6 ft 2 in)	84 kg (185 lb)	25 – 21 June 2001	Pacific
G	11	(United States)	Branden Frazier (I)	1.93 m (6 ft 4 in)	81 kg (179 lb)	34 – 23 July 1992	Fordham
F	12	(Taiwan)	Hu Kai-Hsiang	1.90 m (6 ft 3 in)	93 kg (205 lb)	35 – 16 May 1991	Chinese Culture
C	13	(Taiwan)	Hsieh Zong-Rong	1.99 m (6 ft 6 in)	98 kg (216 lb)	31 – 16 August 1995	NTUST
F	17	(Croatia)	Domagoj Vuković (FA)	2.08 m (6 ft 10 in)	100 kg (220 lb)	32 – 29 October 1993	Croatia
F	21	(Taiwan)	Lu Kuan-Ting	1.97 m (6 ft 6 in)	100 kg (220 lb)	33 – 13 October 1992	NTUA
F	24	(Taiwan)	Kuo Shao-Chieh	1.90 m (6 ft 3 in)	84 kg (185 lb)	36 – 9 April 1990	TNU
C	27	(Slovenia)	Žiga Dimec (I)	2.11 m (6 ft 11 in)	113 kg (249 lb)	33 – 20 February 1993	Slovenia
F	29	(Taiwan)	Han Chieh-Yu	1.94 m (6 ft 4 in)	95 kg (209 lb)	26 – 17 December 1999	NTSU
F	33	(United States)	Nick Perkins (I)	2.03 m (6 ft 8 in)	113 kg (249 lb)	29 – 15 October 1996	Buffalo
C	54	(Taiwan)	Wu Tai-Hao	2.03 m (6 ft 8 in)	108 kg (238 lb)	41 – 7 February 1985	BYU-Hawaii
G	68	(Taiwan)	Chang Po-Sheng	1.85 m (6 ft 1 in)	82 kg (181 lb)	39 – 2 February 1987	NTUA
F	-	(Taiwan)	Liu Chun-Ting	1.87 m (6 ft 2 in)	75 kg (165 lb)	27 – 31 March 1999	Chien Hsin Tech
G	-	(Taiwan)	Chang Chih-Hao	1.76 m (5 ft 9 in)	70 kg (154 lb)	24 – 29 December 2001	NTUS
G	-	(Taiwan)	Lee Yun-Chieh	1.90 m (6 ft 3 in)	84 kg (185 lb)	26 – 21 August 2000	NCCU

Head coach

- (Austria) Raoul Korner

Assistant coach(es)

- (Taiwan) Lin Yu-Cheng
- (Republic of Ireland) Sean Kilmartin

Strength & conditioning coach(es)

- (Taiwan) Kuo Han-Po

Athletic trainer(s)

- (Taiwan) Lin Te-Min

Legend

- (C) Team captain
- (I) Import player
- (FS) Foreign student player
- (HP) Heritage player
- (FA) Free agent
- (DP) Unsigned draft pick
- (AI) EASL Asian import
- (S) Suspended
- Injured

- Roster
Updated: August 20, 2024

== Game log ==
=== Preseason ===
2024 preseason game log
Total: 0–0 (Home: 0–0; Road: 0–0)
Preseason : 0–0 (Home: 0–0; Road: 0–0)

Game	Date	Team	Score	High points	High rebounds	High assists	Location Attendance	Record
1	October 12	Pilots					NCKU Chung Cheng Gym	
2	October 13	Braves					NCKU Chung Cheng Gym	

2024–25 schedule

== Transactions ==
=== Loan return ===
Date	Player	Team	Ref.
June 25, 2024	Wu Tai-Hao	Yulon Luxgen Dinos	
June 25, 2024	Lan Shao-Fu	Yulon Luxgen Dinos	

=== Free Agency ===
==== Re-sign ====
Date	Player	Contract terms	Ref.
August 8, 2024	Ku Mao Wei-Chia	—N/a	
August 28, 2024	Bayasgalan Delgerchuluun	—N/a	

==== Additions ====
Date	Player	Contract terms	Former team	Ref.
July 2, 2024	Liu Chun-Ting	—N/a	(Japan) Aomori Wat's	
July 15, 2024	Chang Chih-Hao	—N/a	NTUS	
July 15, 2024	Lee Yun-Chieh	—N/a	NCCU Griffins	
July 30, 2024	Nick Perkins	—N/a	(Japan) Nagasaki Velca	
August 6, 2024	De'Mon Brooks	—N/a	(Japan) Levanga Hokkaido	
August 11, 2024	Branden Frazier	—N/a	(Spain) Estudiantes	
August 14, 2024	Ethan Chung	—N/a	(United States) Pacific Boxers	
August 17, 2024	Žiga Dimec	—N/a	(Poland) Anwil Włocławek	
August 20, 2024	Hsieh Zong-Rong	—N/a	Taipei Fubon Braves	

==== Subtractions ====
Date	Player	Reason	New team	Ref.
June 28, 2024	Milko Bjelica	contract expired	(Japan) Saitama Broncos	
July 5, 2024	Lu Chi-Erh	contract expired	Taiwan Beer Leopards	
July 10, 2024	Li Han-Sheng	contract expired	Hsinchu Toplus Lioneers	
July 12, 2024	Su Yi-Chin	contract expired	Taipei Taishin Mars	
July 17, 2024	Chien Wei-Ju	—N/a	Formosa Dreamers	
July 23, 2024	Nick King	—N/a	Taipei Fubon Braves	
August 12, 2024	Lan Shao-Fu	mutual agreement to part ways	—N/a	
August 15, 2024	Egidijus Mockevičius	—N/a	(Mexico) El Calor de Cancún	
August 20, 2024	Wu Hung-Hsing	appeared in New Taipei CTBC DEA's Summer League roster as test player	—N/a	
