= Matt Mobley =

American basketball player (born 1994)

No. 5 – Trepça
- Position: Point guard / shooting guard
- League: Kosovo Basketball Superleague

Personal information
- Born: September 1, 1994 (age 32) Worcester, Massachusetts, U.S.
- Listed height: 6 ft 4 in (1.93 m)
- Listed weight: 185 lb (84 kg)

Career information
- High school: St. Peter-Marian (Worcester, Massachusetts); Worcester Academy (Worcester, Massachusetts)
- College: Central Connecticut (2013–2015); St. Bonaventure (2016–2018)
- NBA draft: 2018: undrafted
- Playing career: 2018–present

Career history
- 2018–2019: Spirou
- 2019: Élan Béarnais Pau-Orthez
- 2019–2020: Sigortam.net İTÜ BB
- 2020–2021: Fraport Skyliners
- 2021–2022: Zaragoza
- 2022: ratiopharm Ulm
- 2022: TNT Tropang Giga
- 2023: JDA Dijon
- 2024: SLUC Nancy
- 2024: Wilki Morskie Szczecin
- 2025: Guaiqueríes de Margarita
- 2025: CS Maristes
- 2026: Anhui Wenyi
- 2026–present: Trepça

Career highlights
- Belgian League Points Per Game Leader (2019); PBL All-Offensive Team (2019); Belgian League Volvo 3 Point Champion (2018); Belgian League All-Star/Starter (2018); First-team All-Atlantic 10 (2018); Third-team All-Atlantic 10 (2017); Second-team All-NEC (2015); NEC Most Improved Player (2015); NEC All-Rookie Team (2014)

Matthew Warren Mobley (born September 1, 1994) is an American professional basketball player for Trepça of the Kosovo Basketball Superleague. He played college basketball for St. Bonaventure and Central Connecticut State.

== Early life ==
Mobley is the son of Ronald and Pamela Mobley and grew up in the Washington Heights neighborhood of Worcester, Massachusetts. As a child he always begged his mother to go to the playground where he would play basketball against teenagers. Mobley developed into a star at St. Peter-Marian High School averaging 28.2 points, 10.1 rebounds, and 7.3 assists per game as a senior. He led the team to the Central Massachusetts Division 1 title game, earned 2012 Hometeam Player of the Year honors, and was a finalist for the Massachusetts Gatorade Player of the Year award. He opted to spend a postgraduate year at Worcester Academy and developed into a good scorer after Rene Castro was injured. Besides Castro, who later played against Mobley at Duquesne, Mobley played alongside several future Division 1 players at Worcester Academy: Darryl Reynolds (Villanova), Matt Cimino (George Washington/American) and Matt Panaggio (Mercer).

== College career ==
Mobley began his college career at Central Connecticut State and averaged 6.8 points per game in his freshman season. He increased his scoring to 17.2 points per game as a sophomore and earned Second-team All-Northeast Conference honors. After the season he decided to transfer to St. Bonaventure after developing a relationship with coach Mark Schmidt, sitting out a season per NCAA regulations. Mobley had a season-high 34 points and set a St. Bonaventure record with nine 3-pointers in a loss to VCU on February 4, 2017. On February 22, Mobley finished with 31 points and 10 rebounds to lead the Bonnies past St. Joseph’s, 83–77. He was named to the Third-team All-Atlantic 10 Conference as a junior. He averaged 18.5 points per game, which was fourth in the conference. In addition, Mobley led the NCAA Division I in minutes per game with 38.3.

On January 31, 2018, Mobley scored a career-high 35 points and had 11 rebounds to lead St. Bonaventure to a victory over George Mason, 85–69. As a senior, Mobley averaged 18.1 points, 5.0 rebounds and 2.4 assists per game. He was named to the First-team All-Atlantic 10. Mobley set a St. Bonaventure single-season record with 105 3-pointers as a senior and set an Atlantic 10 tournament record with nine 3-pointers in a victory over Richmond; along with Jaylen Adams, Mobley helped the Bonnies to a 26–8 record. After the season, he was invited to the Portsmouth Invitational Tournament. Mobley was awarded the Oscar Robertson National Player of the Week by the United States Basketball Writers Association, for the week of February 18, 2018.

Season averages
| Season | Team | Min | FGM-FGA | FG% | 3PM-3PA | 3P% | FTM-FTA | FT% | REB | AST | BLK | STL | PF | TO | PTS |
| 2013–14 | CCSU | 24.4 | 2.3-6.1 | .370 | 1.0-3.4 | .291 | 1.2-1.4 | .881 | 2.1 | 1.7 | 0.0 | 0.8 | 1.9 | 1.5 | 6.8 |
| 2014–15 | CCSU | 37.0 | 5.5-13.8 | .400 | 2.4-6.7 | .357 | 3.8-5.0 | .756 | 2.8 | 1.8 | 0.2 | 0.8 | 2.1 | 2.7 | 17.2 |
| 2016–17 | SBON | 38.3 | 5.5-13.1 | .420 | 2.7-7.1 | .379 | 4.8-5.6 | .861 | 5.8 | 2.6 | 0.3 | 1.6 | 2.4 | 2.3 | 18.5 |
| 2017–18 | SBON | 37.6 | 5.5-13.1 | .418 | 3.1-8.3 | .372 | 4.0-4.7 | .862 | 5.0 | 2.4 | 0.1 | 1.1 | 2.6 | 2.4 | 18.1 |

== Professional career ==
Prior to the 2018 NBA draft, Mobley had some workouts with NBA teams: the Brooklyn Nets, Charlotte Hornets, Los Angeles Lakers, Utah Jazz, Sacramento Kings and Philadelphia 76ers. After going undrafted, Mobley was signed by the Jazz to a Summer League deal. On August 11, 2018, Mobley signed with Proximus Spirou of the Belgian side. He averaged 16.5 points, 3.2 rebounds and 2.2 assists per game while shooting 41.5% from three-point range. On June 29, 2019, he has signed with Élan Béarnais Pau-Orthez of the LNB Pro A. He averaged 9 points and 2.5 rebounds per game. On October 30, 2019, Mobley signed with Sigortam.net İTÜ BB of the Turkish Basketball League (BSL).

On February 28, 2020, he has signed with Fraport Skyliners of the Basketball Bundesliga (BBL). Mobley played only one game before the season was cancelled. On September 15, he re-signed with the team. Mobley averaged 20 points, 4.7 rebounds, and 3.5 assists per game. On July 22, 2021, he signed with Basket Zaragoza of the Spanish Liga ACB.

On August 27, 2022, he signed with ratiopharm Ulm of the Basketball Bundesliga (BBL).

On November 20, 2022, Mobley signed with the TNT Tropang Giga of the Philippine Basketball Association (PBA) to replace Cameron Oliver as the team's import for the 2022–23 PBA Commissioner's Cup.

On January 4, 2023, he signed with JDA Dijon of the LNB Pro A.

On October 6, 2023, Mobley signed with Taipei Mars of the T1 League. He never played for the team as his contract was terminated on November 10. On January 17, 2024, Mobley signed with SLUC Nancy of the LNB Pro A.

On March 11, 2024, he signed with Wilki Morskie Szczecin of the Polish Basketball League (PLK).
