= Doral Moore =

American basketball player (born 1997)

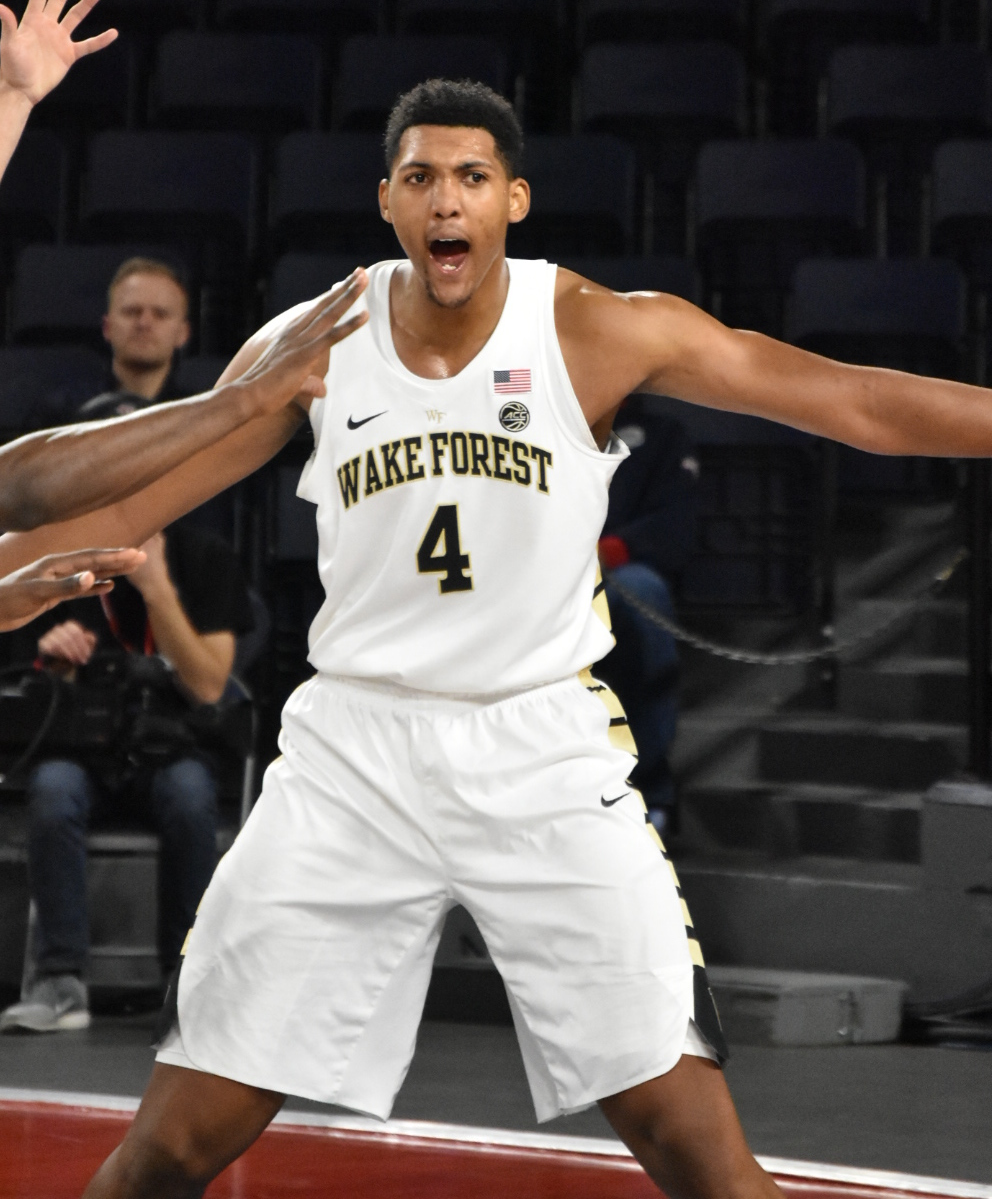
- Moore with the Wake Forest Demon Deacons in 2017

Personal information
- Born: January 21, 1997 (age 29) Louisville, Kentucky
- Listed height: 7 ft 1 in (2.16 m)
- Listed weight: 280 lb (127 kg)

Career information
- High school: Montverde Academy (Montverde, Florida)
- College: Wake Forest (2015–2018)
- NBA draft: 2018: undrafted
- Playing career: 2018–2023
- Position: Center

Career history
- 2018–2019: Memphis Hustle
- 2019–2020: Delaware Blue Coats
- 2021: Grises de Humacao
- 2021–2022: Taiwan Beer
- 2022: TaiwanBeer HeroBears
- 2022: Ostioneros de Guaymas
- 2022: AEL Limassol
- 2023: Correbasket UAT
- 2023: Stockton Kings
- Stats at Basketball Reference

Doral Lamont Larod Moore (born January 21, 1997) is an American former basketball player He played college basketball at Wake Forest University from 2015 to 2018.

== Early life ==
Doral L. Moore Jr. was born in Louisville, Kentucky, on January 21, 1997, to parents Valerie and Doral Moore. He was raised in Stockbridge, Georgia.

Moore attended Luella High School in Mcdonough, Georgia and Montverde Academy in Montverde, Florida, and played on both the basketball teams. On April 4, 2015, the Eagles won the Dick's Sporting Goods High School National Tournament. He graduated in 2015.

== College career ==
Moore was rated as a top 60 prospect by 247Sports and a 72nd in the ESPN 100 in 2015. He chose Wake Forest University and played three seasons with the Demon Deacons as a center under head coach and former NCAA player of the year Danny Manning.

In his final season, he averaged 11.1 points and 9.4 rebounds; he had a team-best 61 blocks and set a single-season school record by shooting 68.9% from the field. In 2017–18, he led the ACC in field goal percentage (.689), true shooting percentage (.658), and rebound percentage (21.0). In the same year, he placed in the conference's top 10 with 9.4 rebounds per game (3rd), 9.1% block percentage (4th), 26.0 player efficiency rating (5th), 291 total rebounds (6th), 2.0 blocks per game (7th), and 61 total blocks (8th). In his ACC career, he finished 2nd in field goal percentage with .653, 4th in total rebound percentage with 19.6, and 8th in block percentage with 9.9.

=== College statistics ===
Year	Team	GP	GS	MPG	FG%	3P%	FT%	RPG	APG	SPG	BPG	PPG
2015–16	Wake Forest	30	1	7.1	64.9	0.0	58.1	2.6	0.0	0.2	0.8	3.8
2016–17	Wake Forest	31	0	8.3	52.5	0.0	53.3	2.2	0.0	0.1	0.9	2.6
2017–18	Wake Forest	31	30	25.5	68.9	0.0	45.8	9.4	0.3	0.4	2.0	11.1
Career		92	31	13.7	65.3	0.0	50	4.8	0.1	0.2	1.2	5.8

== Professional career ==
=== Memphis Hustle (2018–2019) ===
On April 17, 2018, Moore announced that he was forgoing his senior year at Wake Forest and instead entered the NBA draft. Moore competed for the Washington Wizards in NBA Summer League. On August 30, 2018, Memphis Grizzlies General Manager Chris Wallace announced Moore signed with the team and was added to the team's training camp roster. He was waived on October 13, as one of the final roster cuts before opening night and subsequently added to the roster of the Grizzlies' NBA G League affiliate, the Memphis Hustle.

=== Delaware Blue Coats (2019–2020) ===
On October 17, 2019, Moore's returning player rights were traded to the Delaware Blue Coats for a third round selection in the 2019 G League draft. He recorded 19 points, 17 rebounds, five blocks, one assist and one steal in a win over the Lakeland Magic on December 1. Moore averaged 7.0 points and 6.1 rebounds per game for the Blue Coats.

On January 22, 2021, Moore signed with the London Lions of the British Basketball League, but did not play for them.

=== Grises de Humacao (2021) ===
On August 6, 2021, Moore signed with Grises de Humacao of the Baloncesto Superior Nacional.

=== Taiwan Beer (2021) ===
On November 23, 2021, Moore signed with Taiwan Beer of the Super Basketball League. He averaged 16.3 points, 13.3 rebounds, and 1.2 assists in 12 games.

=== TaiwanBeer HeroBears (2022) ===
On February 10, 2022, TaiwanBeer HeroBears of the T1 League announced that they have promoted Doral to the higher-tier league. He appeared in nine games, averaging 8.6 points, 7.6 rebounds, 0.8. On March 23, 2022, Doral was released.

=== Raptors 905 / Stockton Kings (2023) ===
On October 30, 2023, Moore signed with Raptors 905, but was waived on November 9.

On December 21, 2023, Moore signed with the Stockton Kings of the NBA G League, but was waived two days later.
