= Troy Williams =

American basketball player (born 1994)

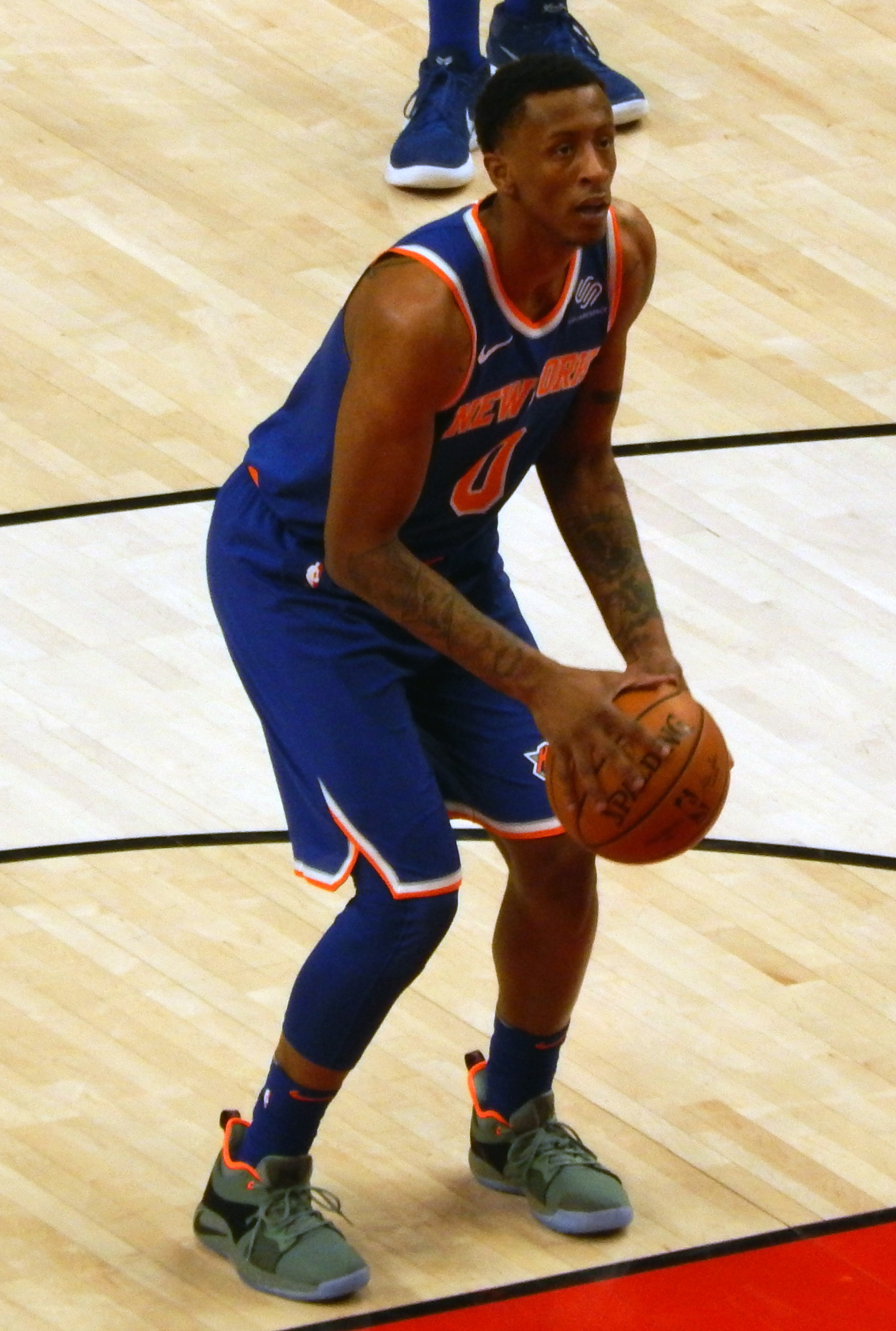
- Williams in 2018

Free agent
- Position: Small forward

Personal information
- Born: December 30, 1994 (age 31) Hampton, Virginia, U.S.
- Listed height: 6 ft 7 in (2.01 m)
- Listed weight: 218 lb (99 kg)

Career information
- High school: Phoebus (Hampton, Virginia); Oak Hill Academy (Mouth of Wilson, Virginia)
- College: Indiana (2013–2016)
- NBA draft: 2016: undrafted
- Playing career: 2016–present

Career history
- 2016–2017: Memphis Grizzlies
- 2016–2017: →Iowa Energy
- 2017: Iowa Energy
- 2017–2018: Houston Rockets
- 2017–2018: →Rio Grande Valley Vipers
- 2018: New York Knicks
- 2018–2019: Sacramento Kings
- 2018–2019: →Stockton Kings
- 2019–2020: Carpegna Prosciutto Basket Pesaro
- 2021–2022: Taoyuan Leopards
- 2023: Blackwater Bossing
- 2023: Gladiadores de Anzoátegui
- 2024: Taiwan Beer
- 2025–2026: Venados de Mazatlán

Career highlights
- NBA D-League Slam Dunk Contest champion (2017); Third-team All-Big Ten (2016); Virginia Gatorade Player of the Year (2013)
- Stats at NBA.com
- Stats at Basketball Reference

Troy Williams (born December 30, 1994) is an American professional basketball player. He previously attended and played college basketball for the Indiana Hoosiers.

== High school career ==
Williams played his first three seasons at Phoebus High School in Hampton, Virginia before transferring to Oak Hill Academy for his senior season. As a senior in 2012–13, he averaged 16.2 points, 7.5 rebounds, 4.0 assists and 2.0 blocks during the regular season, compiling nine double-doubles. He was named Gatorade Player of the Year for the state of Virginia and led Oak Hill to a regular season record of 34–5 and an appearance in the National High School Invitational.

College recruiting
Name	Hometown	School	Height	Weight	Commit date
Troy Williams; G	Hampton, VA	Oak Hill Academy	6 ft 6 in (1.98 m)	190 lb (86 kg)	Oct 28, 2012
Troy Williams; G	Recruit ratings: Scout: Rivals: 247Sports: ESPN:				
Overall recruit ranking: Scout: 67 Rivals: 47 247Sports: 35 ESPN: 54
Note: In many cases, Scout, Rivals, 247Sports, On3, and ESPN may conflict in their listings of height and weight.; In these cases, the average was taken. ESPN grades are on a 100-point scale.; Sources: "Indiana Commit List for 2013". Rivals.; "2013 Indiana Basketball Commits". Scout.; "Indiana Hoosiers". ESPN.; "Scout.com Team Recruiting Rankings". Scout.; "2013 Team Ranking". Rivals.

== College career ==
As a freshman at Indiana in 2013–14, Williams started all 32 games, averaging 7.3 points and 4.4 rebounds while shooting 50.9 percent from the floor. On March 10, 2014, he was named Big Ten Freshman of the Week.

As a sophomore in 2014–15, Williams played in 32 games, making 28 starts. He was named Big Ten Player of the Week on December 22, Oscar Robertson National Player of the Week on December 23, and honorable mention All-Big Ten at the season's end. He averaged 7.4 rebounds per game to lead the team, while his 13.0 points per game ranked third on the team. He recorded 11 points, 12 rebounds and four assists in the second round of the NCAA Tournament against Wichita State, marking his sixth double-double of the season.

Following his sophomore season, Williams considered entering the 2015 NBA draft, but decided to return to the Hoosiers for his junior year.

As a junior in 2015–16, Williams earned third-team All-Big Ten honors. He played in 35 games and made 34 starts, averaging 13.3 points and 5.8 rebounds per game.

On May 25, 2016, Williams declared for the NBA draft, forgoing his final year of college eligibility.

=== College statistics ===
Year	Team	GP	GS	MPG	FG%	3P%	FT%	RPG	APG	SPG	BPG	PPG
2013–14	Indiana	32	32	21.5	.509	.207	.675	4.4	.9	.8	.4	7.3
2014–15	Indiana	32	28	27.6	.540	.462	.742	7.4	2.0	1.0	.5	13.0
2015–16	Indiana	35	34	26.2	.513	.347	.691	5.8	2.0	1.1	.8	13.3
Career		99	94	25.1	.522	.325	.705	5.9	1.6	1.0	.6	11.3

== Professional career ==
=== Memphis Grizzlies (2016–2017) ===
After going undrafted in the 2016 NBA draft, Williams joined the Phoenix Suns for the 2016 NBA Summer League. In six games at Las Vegas, he averaged 12.3 points, 4.3 rebounds and 1.7 steals in 22.2 minutes per game. On August 8, 2016, he signed with the Memphis Grizzlies. Williams secured an opening-night roster spot after impressing the Grizzlies during training camp and preseason. He made his debut for the Grizzlies in their second game of the season on October 29, 2016, recording three points, one assist and two steals in nine minutes off the bench in a 111–104 loss to the New York Knicks. On November 26, 2016, he had an 18-point effort in a 110–107 win over the Miami Heat. On January 30, 2017, he was waived by the Grizzlies. During his time with Memphis, Williams received multiple assignments to the Iowa Energy of NBA Development League.

=== Iowa Energy (2017) ===
On February 3, 2017, Williams was acquired by the Iowa Energy after being waived by the Grizzlies. On February 18, 2017, Williams won the 2017 D-League Dunk Contest.

=== Houston Rockets (2017–2018) ===
On March 10, 2017, Williams signed a 10-day contract with the Houston Rockets, and was immediately assigned to the Rio Grande Valley Vipers. On March 20, 2017, he signed with the Rockets for the rest of the season, despite having not appeared in a game during his 10-day contract. On April 2, 2017, he was recalled from the D-League and went on to score 18 of his career-high 21 points in the first half of the Rockets' 123–116 win over the Phoenix Suns.

On July 25, 2017, Williams re-signed with the Rockets. He was waived on February 14, 2018, to make room for newly acquired Joe Johnson.

=== New York Knicks (2018) ===
On February 21, 2018, Williams signed a 10-day contract with the New York Knicks and on March 13, he signed a multi-year contract. On April 2, the Knicks announced he would miss the rest of the season with a broken jaw. On July 16, 2018, he was officially waived by the Knicks.

=== Sacramento Kings (2018–2019) ===
On July 27, 2018, Williams signed with the New Orleans Pelicans, but was later waived by the team on October 17, 2018.

On October 20, Williams signed with the Sacramento Kings, on a two-way contract with their G League affiliate, the Stockton Kings.

On October 27, 2019, Williams was included in the training camp roster of the Northern Arizona Suns.

=== Carpegna Prosciutto Basket Pesaro (2019–2020) ===
On December 12, 2019, Williams signed with Carpegna Prosciutto Basket Pesaro in the Italian Serie A until the end of the season. After the interruption of all the basketball competitions due to the outbreak of the coronavirus, however, he decided to quit the team on March 9, 2020.

=== Taoyuan Leopards (2021–2022) ===
On November 21, 2021, Williams signed with the Taoyuan Leopards of the T1 League. On June 27, 2022, he re-signed with the team.

=== Blackwater Bossing (2023) ===
In February 2023, Williams signed with the Blackwater Bossing of the Philippine Basketball Association (PBA) to replace Shawn Glover as the team's import for the 2023 PBA Governors' Cup. In his debut for the team on February 9, Williams recorded 55 points, 14 rebounds, and five assists on a 106–119 loss to the Terrafirma Dyip.

== NBA career statistics ==
Legend
GP	Games played	GS	Games started	MPG	Minutes per game
FG%	Field goal percentage	3P%	3-point field goal percentage	FT%	Free throw percentage
RPG	Rebounds per game	APG	Assists per game	SPG	Steals per game
BPG	Blocks per game	PPG	Points per game	**Bold**	Career high

=== Regular season ===
Year	Team	GP	GS	MPG	FG%	3P%	FT%	RPG	APG	SPG	BPG	PPG
2016–17	Memphis	**24**	**13**	17.4	.415	.244	.600	1.8	.7	1.0	**.3**	5.3
2016–17	Houston	6	3	**23.5**	**.500**	**.381**	**.857**	**4.0**	**1.0**	.5	.1	**9.6**
2017–18	Houston	4	0	4.3	.222	.000	.333	1.0	.3	.3	.0	1.3
2017–18	New York	17	1	17.1	.490	.333	.704	3.5	.9	**1.1**	.2	7.5
2018–19	Sacramento	21	0	14.9	.449	.299	.600	2.8	.5	.5	**.4**	5.3
Career		72	17	16.3	.449	.299	.649	2.7	.7	.8	.3	6.0

=== Playoffs ===
Year	Team	GP	GS	MPG	FG%	3P%	FT%	RPG	APG	SPG	BPG	PPG
2017	Houston	5	0	3.8	.000	.000	.500	1.4	.2	.0	.0	.2
Career		5	0	3.8	.000	.000	.500	1.4	.2	.0	.6	.2

== Personal life ==
Williams was raised by his mother, Patty, and his guardian (uncle) Marcellus Spencer "Boo" Williams Jr., who played collegiately for Saint Joseph's University and now runs the Boo Williams AAU program and Boo Williams Nike Invitational in his native Hampton, Virginia.
