= Marcus Gilbert (basketball) =

American basketball player

Personal information
- Born: January 1, 1993 (age 33) Smyrna, Delaware, U.S.
- Listed height: 6 ft 6 in (1.98 m)
- Listed weight: 185 lb (84 kg)

Career information
- High school: Academy of New Church (Bryn Athyn, Pennsylvania)
- College: Fairfield (2012–2016)
- NBA draft: 2016: undrafted
- Playing career: 2016–present
- Position: Small forward

Career history
- 2016–2017: Basket Ferentino
- 2017: Viola Reggio Calabria
- 2017–2018: FC Porto
- 2018–2019: Palma
- 2019–2020: Ifaistos Limnou
- 2020–2021: APOEL
- 2022: Tainan TSG GhostHawks
- 2022: Héroes de Falcón
- 2023: Shumen
- 2023: SLAC
- 2024–present: Gréngewald Hueschtert

Career highlights
- 2x All-MAAC (2015, 2016)

Marcus Emmanuel Gilbert (born January 1, 1993) is an American professional basketball player. Previously, Gilbert played college basketball for Fairfield University where he was All-MAAC in 2015 and 2016.

== Playing career ==
=== High school ===
Gilbert is a native of Smyrna, Delaware, and attended the Academy of New Church in Bryn Athyn, Pennsylvania. As a senior, Gilbert averaged 17 points and 8 rebounds per game while leading his team to a 19–7 overall record and a 6–1 mark in conference play.

=== College ===
Gilbert played college basketball for Fairfield University in Fairfield, Connecticut, from 2013 to 2016. During his freshman season for the Fairfield Stags, Gilbert earned a spot on the MAAC All-Rookie team after being named MAAC rookie of the week three times. Gilbert finished his career as one of the top basketball players in Fairfield history. He scored 1,661 points which ranks fourth all-time, and hit 240 three-point field goals which ranks second all-time at Fairfield. Gilbert earned All-MAAC third team selection in 2015 and All-MAAC first team in 2016. He also collected spots on the NABC Division I All-District 1 and All-Metropolitan Basketball Writers Association (MBWA) teams in 2016.

=== Professional ===
Gilbert participated in several NBA workouts including the Boston Celtics and Utah Jazz. After going undrafted, Gilbert signed to play for Basket Ferentino in the Serie A2 Basket.

On August 7, 2017, Gilbert signed with FC Porto of the Liga Portuguesa de Basquetebol.

On July 9, 2018, Gilbert signed with Iberojet Palma of the LEB Oro.

On August 13, 2019, Gilbert signed with Ifaistos Limnou of the Greek Basket League. He averaged 5.3 points and 2.1 rebounds per game. On September 30, 2020, Gilbert signed with APOEL B.C. of the Cyprus Basketball Division A. He averaged 14.3 points, 5.2 rebounds, 2.0 assists and 1.2 steals per game. On February 12, 2022, Gilbert signed with the Tainan TSG GhostHawks of the T1 League.

In October 2023, Gilbert played for the Guinean club SLAC in the Road to BAL. In three games, he averaged 15.3 points and 5.7 rebounds, while SLAC failed to qualify for the semi-finals.
