= Darryl Reynolds =

American basketball player and coach

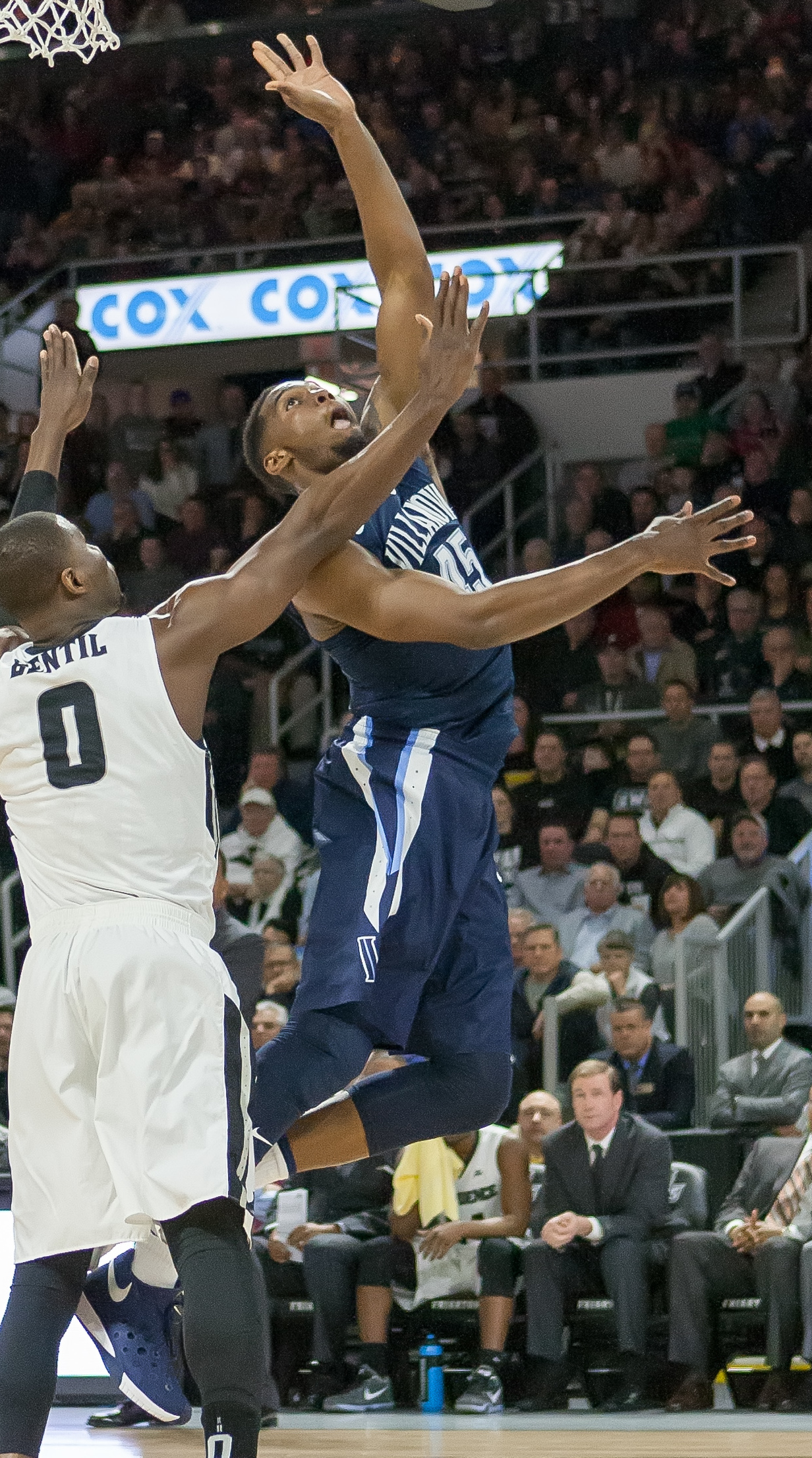

Personal information
- Born: October 13, 1993 (age 33) Philadelphia, Pennsylvania, U.S.
- Listed height: 6 ft 9 in (2.06 m)
- Listed weight: 240 lb (109 kg)

Career information
- High school: Lower Merion (Ardmore, Pennsylvania)
- College: Villanova (2013–2017)
- NBA draft: 2017: undrafted
- Playing career: 2017–present
- Position: Forward
- Number: 45

Career history

Playing
- 2017–2018: Start Lublin

Coaching
- 2018–2019: Villanova (Director of Player Development)

Career highlights
- NCAA champion (2016)

Darryl Nasir Reynolds (born October 13, 1993) is an American basketball coach and former player. He played one season for Start Lublin in the Polish Basketball League. He played college basketball for the Villanova Wildcats.

== Early life ==
Reynolds was born in Philadelphia. He attended Lower Merion High School and played AAU Basketball 1st for the Sharon Knights AAU then for Philly Pride. Coming into his senior season, his best college offer was Division II Holy Family University, but as the season went on he began to get Division I looks. As a senior in 2011–12, he averaged 11.2 points, 8.2 rebounds and 4.2 blocked shots per game, improving those numbers to 15 points, 11 rebounds and 5.3 blocks in the PIAA playoffs. He led the Aces to Pennsylvania Class AAAA state championship game and was a first-team All-Central League and first-team All-Main Line selection. Reynolds did a postgraduate year at the Worcester Academy, where he led the Hilltoppers to a 21–6 record. He signed with Villanova in April 2013 after considering Seton Hall, Utah, and South Carolina, choosing the Wildcats because he liked coach Jay Wright and the style of play. Jay Wright began to notice him after Larry Brown pointed him out at a Chester-Lower Merion game when Wright was scouting Rondae Hollis-Jefferson. When Markus Kennedy transferred to SMU, Reynolds was given a scholarship offer.

== College career ==
Reynolds played sparingly his freshman year, averaging 0.3 points and 1.0 rebounds in 3.1 minutes per game. He began to see more playing time in the non-conference season of his sophomore campaign, contributing six points, four rebounds and two blocked shots in a matchup against Saint Joseph's. Reynolds averaged 1.4 points and 1.2 rebounds in 5.4 minutes per game as a sophomore. He benefited in practicing against JayVaughn Pinkston, who taught him how to be a more physical player. "I had to learn how to play a lot harder," Reynolds said.

As a junior, Reynolds was a key reserve on the national championship-winning team. He set a new career high for rebounds with 13 in an 83–58 victory over Creighton on February 3, 2016. With Daniel Ochefu injured, Reynolds scored a career-high 19 points to go with 10 rebounds in a 72–60 win against Providence on February 6. Consequently, he was named to the Big East Honor Roll for the week of February 8. The next game, Reynolds notched 14 points and six rebounds in an 86–59 win over DePaul. He played in all six NCAA Tournament wins, with his best effort coming in the Sweet 16 with eight points and five rebounds in a 92–69 win over Miami. On the season, Reynolds averaged 3.6 points and 4.5 rebounds in 17.1 minutes per game.

With the graduation of Ochefu, Reynolds entered the starting lineup as a senior. In a 79–76 victory against Purdue on November 14, he had 12 points and eight rebounds. On November 27, he added 12 points and eight rebounds in an 82–57 win over Penn, shooting 4-for-4 from the floor. The next game, he had a season-high 13 points to go along with six rebounds in an 88–57 win over Saint Joseph's. Reynolds's highest scoring game in Big East play was a 10-point effort in a victory over Xavier on January 10, 2017. He missed five games with a rib injury but returned for the regular-season finale against Georgetown, collecting seven rebounds and recording two steals in the 81–55 victory. In his senior year, Reynolds averaged 4.5 points and 5.4 rebounds in 23.8 minutes per game.

== Professional career ==
Reynolds participated in The Basketball Tournament 2017 for the Villanova alumni team Supernova. In August 2017 he signed with the Polish team Start Lublin. Reynolds averaged 8.6 points, 7.2 rebounds, and 1.3 blocks per game as the team made the Polish Cup for the first time in their history. In May 2018 Reynolds tore his ACL while playing a game on the La Salle campus. While recuperating, he created the "Stay Tuned with D.Rey" talk show in which he interviewed Villanova basketball players, alumni and faculty.

== Coaching career ==
In 2018, Reynolds became the director of student athlete development at Villanova. He helped guide the team to a 26–10 record and Big East championship in the 2018–19 season. In October 2019, he announced he was departing the coaching staff.
