= Tungnan University =

University in New Taipei, Taiwan

Coordinates: 25.0048°N 121.6044°E

- 東南科技大學
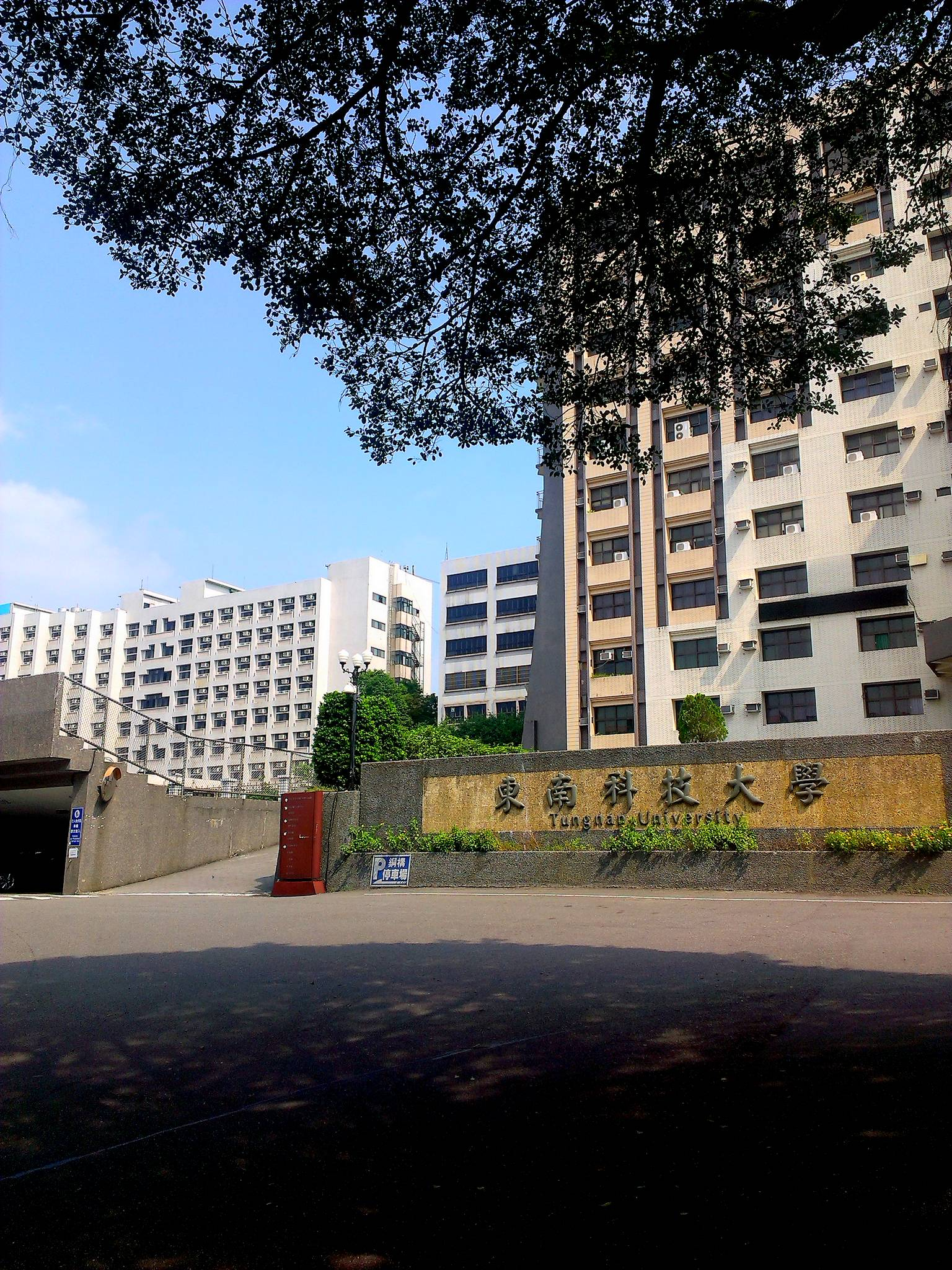
- Type: Private
- Established: August 1970 (as Tungnan Junior College of Technology); 2005 (as TNU)
- Location: Shenkeng, New Taipei, Taiwan
- Website: www.tnu.edu.tw

Tungnan University
- Traditional Chinese: 東南科技大學
Transcriptions
Standard Mandarin
- Hanyu Pinyin: Dōngnán Kējì Dàxué
Southern Min
- Hokkien POJ: Tang-lâm Kho-ki Tāi-ha̍k

Tungnan University (TNU; Chinese: 東南科技大學; Pe̍h-ōe-jī: Tang-lâm Kho-ki Tāi-ha̍k) is a private university in Shenkeng District, New Taipei, Taiwan.

Tungnan University offers undergraduate and graduate programs in a wide range of fields including business, humanities, social sciences, engineering, information technology, and arts. The university has six colleges: College of Business, College of Humanities, College of Social Sciences, College of Engineering, College of Information Technology, and College of Arts.

The university is also home to several research centers and institutes that focus on areas such as management, finance, cross-strait relations, and digital media.

== History ==
TNU was originally established as Tungnan Junior College of Technology in August 1970. In 2000, the college was promoted to Tungnan Institute of Technology and promoted to Tungnan University in 2005. As a former engineering college, Tungnan is strong in a variety of subjects from mechanical to environmental to electrical engineering. It is located in a fairly nice and convenient area several kilometers outside of Taipei city in Shenkeng, which is just east of the Taipei Zoo.

== Faculties ==
College of Engineering			
College of Engineering	Department of Mechanical Engineering	Department of Energy and Refrigerating Air-Conditioning Engineering	Department of Information Technology
College of Engineering	Department of Construction and Spatial Design	Department of Electronic Engineering	
College of Engineering	Department of Environmental Engineering	Department of Electrical Engineering	

- College of Engineering
- College of Management
- College of Applied Science
- Graduate Institute

== See also ==
- List of universities in Taiwan
