= Raoul Korner =

Austrian professional basketball coach (born 1974)

Tainan TSG GhostHawks
- Position: Head coach
- League: P. League+

Personal information
- Born: April 2, 1974 (age 52) Vienna, Austria
- Coaching career: 1999–present

Career history

Coaching
- 1999–2001: Zepter Vienna
- 2001–2003: Mattersburg 49ers
- 2003–2005: Traiskirchen Lions
- 2005–2010: WBC Wels
- 2010–2013: EiffelTowers Den Bosch
- 2013–2016: Phantoms / Löwen Braunschweig
- 2016–2022: medi Bayreuth
- 2022–2023: Hamburg Towers
- 2024–present: Tainan TSG GhostHawks

Career highlights
- As coach: Dutch League champion (2012); Dutch Cup champion (2013); Dutch League Coach of the Year (2013)

Raoul Korner (born April 2, 1974) is an Austrian professional basketball coach. He is the current head coach of Tainan TSG GhostHawks of the P. League+.

== Career ==
=== EiffelTowers Den Bosch (2010–2013) ===
After several years of coaching in Austria, Korner signed with the Dutch club EiffelTowers Den Bosch in July 2010. In his first season coaching Den Bosch, the team finished at the 3rd place and was defeated in the playoff semifinals. In the 2011–12 season, Korner won the Dutch Basketball League with Den Bosch, by beating Leiden 4–1 in the finals. In his third season, he won the DBL Coach of the Year award. With Den Bosch, he also won his first NBB Cup in 2012–13. After the season Korner's department was announced. His assistant coach Sam Jones became the new head coach.

=== Phantoms Braunschweig (2013–2016) ===
In 2013, Korner signed a contract with the German club New Yorker Phantoms Braunschweig.

Korner left Braunschweig on April 30, 2016, and took over head coaching duties at Medi Bayreuth a few days later. He cited Braunschweig's financial condition as a factor in his decision to leave the team.

=== Medi Bayreuth (2016–2022) ===
After an impressive start into the season with Bayreuth, Korner was selected as the "Team International" head coach for the 2017 BBL All-Star Game.

=== Hamburg Towers (2022–2023) ===
After six years at Medi Bayreuth, on June 08, 2022, he signed as head coach at Hamburg Towers of the German Basketball Bundesliga.

=== Tainan TSG GhostHawks (2024–present) ===
On January 29, 2024, he signed as head coach at Tainan TSG GhostHawks of the T1 League.
