= TSG GhostHawks =

Professional basketball team in Taiwan

- 2024–25 TSG GhostHawks season
- Leagues: P. League+
- Founded: August 6, 2021
- History: Tainan TSG GhostHawks; 2021–2024; TSG GhostHawks; 2024–present
- Arena: National Cheng Kung University Chung Cheng Gym
- Capacity: 3,500
- Location: Tainan City, Taiwan
- Team colors: Red, golden, black, white
- President: Wang Chiung-Fen
- General manager: Vacant
- Head coach: Raoul Korner
- Ownership: Taiwan Steel Group
- Championships: 0
- Website: ghosthawks.tw

The TSG GhostHawks (Chinese: 台鋼獵鷹) are a Taiwanese professional basketball team based in Tainan City. They have competed in the T1 League since the 2021–22 season, and play their home games at the Chia Nan University of Pharmacy and Science Shao Tsung Gymnasium. The GhostHawks became one of the six teams of the inaugural T1 League season.

On September 30, 2021, the name of Tainan team was announced as the Tainan TSG GhostHawks.

== Facilities ==
=== Home arenas ===
Arena	Location	Duration
Chia Nan University of Pharmacy and Science Shao Tsung Gymnasium	Tainan City	2021–2024
National Cheng Kung University Chung Cheng Gym	Tainan City	2024–present

=== Training facilities ===
The GhostHawks scheduled to practice at Taiwan Steel University of Science and Technology Gymnasium in 2024.

== Current roster ==
TSG GhostHawks roster
Players
Coaches

Pos.	No.	Nat.	Name	Ht.	Wt.	Age	From
G	3	(Taiwan)	Ku Mao Wei-Chia	1.75 m (5 ft 9 in)	68 kg (150 lb)	26 – 4 December 1999	Chien Hsin Tech
F	4	(United States)	De'Mon Brooks (I)	2.01 m (6 ft 7 in)	104 kg (229 lb)	34 – 28 May 1992	Davidson
G	6	(Mongolia)	Bayasgalan Delgerchuluun (FS)	1.83 m (6 ft 0 in)	75 kg (165 lb)	28 – 30 October 1997	HDUT
G	7	(United States) (Taiwan)	Ethan Chung (HP)	1.87 m (6 ft 2 in)	84 kg (185 lb)	25 – 21 June 2001	Pacific
G	11	(United States)	Branden Frazier (I)	1.93 m (6 ft 4 in)	81 kg (179 lb)	33 – 23 July 1992	Fordham
C	13	(Taiwan)	Hsieh Zong-Rong	1.99 m (6 ft 6 in)	98 kg (216 lb)	30 – 16 August 1995	NTUST
F	17	(Croatia)	Domagoj Vuković (FA)	2.08 m (6 ft 10 in)	100 kg (220 lb)	32 – 29 October 1993	Croatia
F	21	(Taiwan)	Lu Kuan-Ting	1.97 m (6 ft 6 in)	100 kg (220 lb)	33 – 13 October 1992	NTUA
F	24	(Taiwan)	Kuo Shao-Chieh	1.90 m (6 ft 3 in)	84 kg (185 lb)	36 – 9 April 1990	TNU
C	27	(Slovenia)	Žiga Dimec (I)	2.11 m (6 ft 11 in)	113 kg (249 lb)	33 – 20 February 1993	Slovenia
F	33	(United States)	Nick Perkins (I)	2.03 m (6 ft 8 in)	113 kg (249 lb)	29 – 15 October 1996	Buffalo
G	68	(Taiwan)	Chang Po-Sheng	1.85 m (6 ft 1 in)	82 kg (181 lb)	39 – 2 February 1987	NTUA
G	-	(Taiwan)	Chang Chih-Hao	1.76 m (5 ft 9 in)	70 kg (154 lb)	24 – 29 December 2001	NTUS

Head coach

- (Austria) Raoul Korner

Assistant coach(es)

- (Taiwan) Lin Yu-Cheng
- (Republic of Ireland) Sean Kilmartin

Strength & conditioning coach(es)

- (Taiwan) Kuo Han-Po

Athletic trainer(s)

- (Taiwan) Lin Te-Min

Legend

- (C) Team captain
- (I) Import player
- (FS) Foreign student player
- (HP) Heritage player
- (FA) Free agent
- (DP) Unsigned draft pick
- (AI) EASL Asian import
- (S) Suspended
- Injured

- Roster
Updated: August 20, 2024

== Season-by-season record ==
T1 League
Season	Coach	Regular season				Postseason			
Season	Coach	Won	Lost	Win %	Finish	Won	Lost	Win %	Result
2021–22	Wu Chih-Wei	6	24	.200	6th	Did not qualify			
2021–22	Liu Meng-Chu	6	24	.200	6th	Did not qualify			
2022–23	Liu Meng-Chu	19	11	.633	2nd	3	6	.333	Won Semifinals vs Kaohsiung Aquas, 3–2; Lost Finals to New Taipei CTBC DEA, 0–4
2022–23	Ma I-Hung	19	11	.633	2nd	3	6	.333	Won Semifinals vs Kaohsiung Aquas, 3–2; Lost Finals to New Taipei CTBC DEA, 0–4
2023–24	Liu Meng-Chu	7	21	.250	5th	Did not qualify			
2023–24	Lin Yu-Cheng	7	21	.250	5th	Did not qualify			
2023–24	Raoul Korner	7	21	.250	5th	Did not qualify			
Totals		32	56	.364	–	3	6	.333	1 Playoff Appearances

P. League+
Season	Coach	Regular season				Postseason			
Season	Coach	Won	Lost	Win %	Finish	Won	Lost	Win %	Result
2024–25	Raoul Korner	13	11	.542	3rd	1	3	.250	Lost Playoffs to Taipei Fubon Braves, 1–3
Totals		13	11	.542	–	1	3	.250	1 Playoff Appearances
