= TaiwanBeer HeroBears all-time roster =

The following was a list of players who appeared at least in one game for the TaiwanBeer HeroBears (2021–2023) franchise.

== Players ==
Note: Statistics are correct through the end of the 2022–23 T1 League season.

G	Guard	PG	Point guard	SG	Shooting guard	G/F	Guard-forward	F	Forward	SF	Small forward	PF	Power forward	F/C	Forward-center	C	Center

^{+}	Denotes player who had been selected for at least one All-Star Game with the TaiwanBeer HeroBears
0.0	Denotes the TaiwanBeer HeroBears statistics leader (min. 30 games played for the team for per-game statistics)

=== C ===
Player	Name	Nat.	Pos.	From	Yrs	Seasons	Statistics									Ref.
Player	Name	Nat.	Pos.	From	Yrs	Seasons	GP	MP	PTS	REB	AST	MPG	PPG	RPG	APG	Ref.
Chiang Yu-An^{+}	蔣淯安	(Taiwan)	PG	NTUS	2	2021–2023	51	2057:18	921	229	333	40:20	18.1	4.5	6.5	
Chien Chao-Yi	簡肇熠	(Taiwan)	PG	CCU	1	2021–2022	17	109:53	25	7	17	6:27	1.5	0.4	1.0	
Chou Po-Hsun	周伯勳	(Taiwan)	PF	MDU	2	2021–2023	49	1225:45	305	294	62	25:00	6.2	6.0	1.3	
Chou Tzu-Hua	周資華	(Taiwan)	PG	FJU	1	2021–2022	17	178:39	19	20	33	10:30	1.1	1.2	1.9	
Chu I-Tsung^{+}	朱億宗	(Taiwan)	SF	HWU	2	2021–2023	54	1018:54	330	166	77	18:52	6.1	3.1	1.4	

=== D ===
Player	Name	Nat.	Pos.	From	Yrs	Seasons	Statistics									Ref.
Player	Name	Nat.	Pos.	From	Yrs	Seasons	GP	MP	PTS	REB	AST	MPG	PPG	RPG	APG	Ref.
Branden Dawson^{+}	大勝	(United States)	F	Michigan State	1	2022–2023	21	690:25	399	250	65	32:52	19.0	11.9	3.1	
Samuel Deguara	德古拉	(Malta) (Italy)	C	FIU	1	2021–2022	6	191:57	138	88	8	31:59	23.0	14.7	1.3	
Ronald Delph	大福	(United States)	C	Florida Atlantic	1	2021–2022	10	187:35	98	79	5	18:45	9.8	7.9	0.5	

=== E ===
Player	Name	Nat.	Pos.	From	Yrs	Seasons	Statistics									Ref.
Player	Name	Nat.	Pos.	From	Yrs	Seasons	GP	MP	PTS	REB	AST	MPG	PPG	RPG	APG	Ref.
Cleanthony Early	愛禮	(United States)	SF	Wichita State	1	2022–2023	6	223:54	199	45	30	37:19	33.2	7.5	5.0	

=== F ===
Player	Name	Nat.	Pos.	From	Yrs	Seasons	Statistics									Ref.
Player	Name	Nat.	Pos.	From	Yrs	Seasons	GP	MP	PTS	REB	AST	MPG	PPG	RPG	APG	Ref.
Fan Shih-En	范士恩	(Taiwan)	C	NTUST	2	2021–2023	17	179:37	35	37	13	10:33	2.1	2.2	0.8	

=== G ===
Player	Name	Nat.	Pos.	From	Yrs	Seasons	Statistics									Ref.
Player	Name	Nat.	Pos.	From	Yrs	Seasons	GP	MP	PTS	REB	AST	MPG	PPG	RPG	APG	Ref.
Ramon Galloway	蓋樂威	(United States)	SF	La Salle	1	2021–2022	11	411:15	286	69	69	37:23	26.0	6.3	6.3	

=== H ===
Player	Name	Nat.	Pos.	From	Yrs	Seasons	Statistics									Ref.
Player	Name	Nat.	Pos.	From	Yrs	Seasons	GP	MP	PTS	REB	AST	MPG	PPG	RPG	APG	Ref.
Matt Hodgson	哈吉勝	(Australia)	C	Saint Mary's	1	2022–2023	2	46:00	17	13	3	23:00	8.5	6.5	1.5	
Huang Jhen	黃鎮	(Taiwan)	SG	FJU	2	2021–2023	50	734:35	220	102	72	14:41	4.4	2.0	1.4	
Huang Tsung-Han	黃聰翰	(Taiwan)	SG	MDU	2	2021–2023	48	835:13	287	74	41	17:24	6.0	1.5	0.9	

=== I ===
Player	Name	Nat.	Pos.	From	Yrs	Seasons	Statistics									Ref.
Player	Name	Nat.	Pos.	From	Yrs	Seasons	GP	MP	PTS	REB	AST	MPG	PPG	RPG	APG	Ref.
Prince Ibeh	伊倍	(United Kingdom) (Rwanda)	F	Texas	1	2022–2023	14	399:42	88	96	16	28:33	6.3	6.9	1.1	

=== J ===
Player	Name	Nat.	Pos.	From	Yrs	Seasons	Statistics									Ref.
Player	Name	Nat.	Pos.	From	Yrs	Seasons	GP	MP	PTS	REB	AST	MPG	PPG	RPG	APG	Ref.
Perry Jones	瓊斯	(United States)	F	Baylor	1	2022–2023	18	667:29	313	139	75	37:04	17.4	7.7	4.2	

=== L ===
Player	Name	Nat.	Pos.	From	Yrs	Seasons	Statistics									Ref.
Player	Name	Nat.	Pos.	From	Yrs	Seasons	GP	MP	PTS	REB	AST	MPG	PPG	RPG	APG	Ref.
Tyler Lamb	林泰樂	(Thailand) (United States)	SF	Long Beach State	1	2021–2022	11	315:00	182	50	34	28:38	16.5	4.5	3.1	
Lee Chi-Wei^{+}	李啟瑋	(Taiwan)	SG	MDU	2	2021–2023	57	1867:19	608	154	120	32:45	10.7	2.7	2.1	
Liang Hao-Zhen	梁浩真	(Taiwan)	PG	UKN	1	2022–2023	1	0:49	0	0	0	0:49	0.0	0.0	0.0	
Lu Tsai Yu-Lun	呂蔡瑜倫	(Taiwan)	F	Sendai	1	2022–2023	2	5:08	3	1	0	2:34	1.5	0.5	0.0	

=== M ===
Player	Name	Nat.	Pos.	From	Yrs	Seasons	Statistics									Ref.
Player	Name	Nat.	Pos.	From	Yrs	Seasons	GP	MP	PTS	REB	AST	MPG	PPG	RPG	APG	Ref.
Tony Mitchell	米丘	(United States)	SF	Alabama	1	2021–2022	9	311:27	164	70	43	34:36	18.2	7.8	4.8	
Doral Moore	多拉摩爾	(United States)	C	Wake Forest	1	2021–2022	9	159:56	77	68	7	17:46	8.6	7.6	0.8	

=== Q ===
Player	Name	Nat.	Pos.	From	Yrs	Seasons	Statistics									Ref.
Player	Name	Nat.	Pos.	From	Yrs	Seasons	GP	MP	PTS	REB	AST	MPG	PPG	RPG	APG	Ref.
Michael Qualls	柯歐斯	(United States)	G	Arkansas	1	2022–2023	10	368:08	306	105	33	36:48	30.6	10.5	3.3	

=== S ===
Player	Name	Nat.	Pos.	From	Yrs	Seasons	Statistics									Ref.
Player	Name	Nat.	Pos.	From	Yrs	Seasons	GP	MP	PTS	REB	AST	MPG	PPG	RPG	APG	Ref.
Diamond Stone	士東	(United States)	C	Maryland	1	2021–2022	30	1220:12	826	346	70	40:40	27.5	11.5	2.3	

=== T ===
Player	Name	Nat.	Pos.	From	Yrs	Seasons	Statistics									Ref.
Player	Name	Nat.	Pos.	From	Yrs	Seasons	GP	MP	PTS	REB	AST	MPG	PPG	RPG	APG	Ref.
Hasheem Thabeet	塔壁	(Tanzania)	C	UConn	1	2022–2023	8	214:41	116	83	12	26:50	14.5	10.4	1.5	
Tsao Xun-Xiang^{+}	曹薰襄	(Taiwan) (Vietnam)	PG	NTUA	1	2022–2023	28	474:51	195	62	83	16:57	7.0	2.2	3.0	

=== V ===
Player	Name	Nat.	Pos.	From	Yrs	Seasons	Statistics									Ref.
Player	Name	Nat.	Pos.	From	Yrs	Seasons	GP	MP	PTS	REB	AST	MPG	PPG	RPG	APG	Ref.
Milenko Veljković	范姜偉齊	(Serbia)	C	Serbia	1	2022–2023	6	158:14	40	43	4	26:22	6.7	7.2	0.7	

=== W ===
Player	Name	Nat.	Pos.	From	Yrs	Seasons	Statistics									Ref.
Player	Name	Nat.	Pos.	From	Yrs	Seasons	GP	MP	PTS	REB	AST	MPG	PPG	RPG	APG	Ref.
Wang Hao-Chi	王皓吉	(Taiwan)	PF	HWU	1	2021–2022	16	238:13	42	42	16	14:53	2.6	2.6	1.0	

=== Y ===
Player	Name	Nat.	Pos.	From	Yrs	Seasons	Statistics									Ref.
Player	Name	Nat.	Pos.	From	Yrs	Seasons	GP	MP	PTS	REB	AST	MPG	PPG	RPG	APG	Ref.
Yang Tian-You	楊天佑	(Taiwan)	PG	UKN	1	2022–2023	5	32:51	6	5	3	6:34	1.2	1.0	0.6	
