= 2022–23 TaiwanBeer HeroBears season =

Taiwanese professional basketball season

- General Manager: Ha Hsiao-Yuan
- Head Coach: Yang Chih-Hao
- Arena: University of Taipei Tianmu Campus Gymnasium; Fu Jen Catholic University Chung Mei Auditorium

T1 League results
- Record: 16–14 (53.3%)
- Place: 4th
- Playoffs finish: Play-in (lost to Suns, 1–2)

Player records
- Points: Branden Dawson 19.0
- Rebounds: Branden Dawson 11.9
- Assists: Chiang Yu-An 6.3

The 2022–23 TaiwanBeer HeroBears season was the franchise's second season, its second season in the T1 League.

The HeroBears were coached by Yang Chih-Hao in his second year as their head coach.

== Draft ==
Round	Player	Position(s)	School / club team
1	Tsao Xun-Xiang	Guard	NTUA
2	Lu Tsai Yu-Lun	Forward	Sendai
2	Huang Jian-Zhi	Forward	NTNU
3	Huang Hung-Yu	Guard	NTNU

- Reference：

On March 16, 2022, the HeroBears acquired 2022 and 2023 second-round picks from Taichung Wagor Suns in exchange for Chou Tzu-Hua.

On August 25, 2022, the second rounder, Huang Jian-Zhi had joined the Changhua BLL of the Super Basketball League.

On September 14, 2022, the third rounder, Huang Hung-Yu had joined the Taiwan Beer of the Super Basketball League.

== Roster ==
2022–23 TaiwanBeer HeroBears roster
Players
Coaches

Pos.	No.	Nat.	Name	Ht.	Wt.	Age	From
SG	0	(Taiwan)	Huang Jhen	1.93 m (6 ft 4 in)	86 kg (190 lb)	32 – 27 June 1990	FJU
F	7	(United States)	Perry Jones (I)	2.11 m (6 ft 11 in)	107 kg (236 lb)	31 – 24 September 1991	Baylor
SG	11	(Taiwan)	Huang Tsung-Han	1.93 m (6 ft 4 in)	86 kg (190 lb)	28 – 7 July 1994	MDU
PG	14	(Taiwan)	Chiang Yu-An (C)	1.74 m (5 ft 9 in)	65 kg (143 lb)	31 – 4 August 1991	NTUS
C	15	(Taiwan)	Fan Shih-En	1.98 m (6 ft 6 in)	82 kg (181 lb)	28 – 1 June 1994	NTUST
PG	19	(Taiwan)	Yang Tian-You	1.72 m (5 ft 8 in)	73 kg (161 lb)	29 – 24 September 1993	UKN
PF	20	(Taiwan)	Chou Po-Hsun	1.97 m (6 ft 6 in)	85 kg (187 lb)	32 – 6 March 1991	MDU
SF	24	(Taiwan)	Chu I-Tsung	1.86 m (6 ft 1 in)	85 kg (187 lb)	36 – 4 August 1986	HWU
PG	27	(Taiwan)	Liang Hao-Zhen	1.84 m (6 ft 0 in)	80 kg (176 lb)	27 – 4 December 1995	UKN
C	34	(Tanzania)	Hasheem Thabeet (I)	2.21 m (7 ft 3 in)	118 kg (260 lb)	36 – 16 February 1987	UConn
G	45	(United States)	Michael Qualls (I)	1.93 m (6 ft 4 in)	92 kg (203 lb)	29 – 20 January 1994	Arkansas
PG	57	(Taiwan) (Vietnam)	Tsao Xun-Xiang	1.81 m (5 ft 11 in)	78 kg (172 lb)	24 – 16 March 1999	NTUA
SG	75	(Taiwan)	Lee Chi-Wei	1.92 m (6 ft 4 in)	87 kg (192 lb)	30 – 8 April 1993	MDU

Head coach

- (Taiwan) Yang Chih-Hao

Assistant coach(es)

- (Taiwan) Huang Chih-Tsai

Team manager

- (Taiwan) Ha Hsiao-Yuan

Legend

- (C) Team captain
- (I) Import player
- Injured

- Roster
Updated: April 4, 2023

== 2022 interleague play ==
The Taiwan Beer players Liang Hao-Zhen and Feng Cheng-Kai joined to the TaiwanBeer HeroBears, and the TaiwanBeer HeroBears players Chien Chao-Yi and Lu Tsai Yu-Lun joined to the Taiwan Beer in these invitational games. On September 7, 2022, TaiwanBeer HeroBears announced that Shang Wei-Fang joined to the team as the player in these invitational games. And Liang Hao-Zhen didn't appear to the player list.

=== Standings ===
Pos	Team	Pld	W	L	PCT	GB	Qualification
1	TaiwanBeer HeroBears	5	5	0	1.000	—	Advance to Quarterfinals
2	Chinese Taipei National Training Team	5	4	1	.800	1	Advance to Quarterfinals
3	Tainan TSG GhostHawks	5	3	2	.600	2	
4	Yulon Luxgen Dinos	5	2	3	.400	3	
5	PLG RISING STARS	5	1	4	.200	4	
6	Changhua BLL	5	0	5	.000	5	

Source: Official website

=== Group match ===
September 17, 2022	TaiwanBeer HeroBears	92–69	Yulon Luxgen Dinos	Taipei City
17:00 (UTC+8)	Scoring by quarter: 16–19, 25–17, 22–20, 29–13
	Pts: Wang Hao-Chi 22; Rebs: Chou Po-Hsun 7 Asts: Tsao Xun-Xiang 5	boxscore	Pts: Sarr Cheikh Ahmadou Bamba 17; Rebs: Huang Tsung-Han 8 Asts: Ke Min-Hao 4	Arena: Taipei Heping Basketball Gymnasium

September 18, 2022	Changhua BLL	77–102	TaiwanBeer HeroBears	Taipei City
13:00 (UTC+8)	Scoring by quarter: 18–28, 18–31, 15–16, 26–27
	Pts: Chuang Yu-Chi, Cheng Tzu-Yang 14; Rebs: Huang Chien-Chih 6 Asts: Chen Yi-Lun, Chiu Chia-You 4	boxscore	Pts: Feng Cheng-Kai 13; Rebs: Fan Shih-En 8 Asts: Tsao Xun-Xiang 6	Arena: Taipei Heping Basketball Gymnasium

September 19, 2022	TaiwanBeer HeroBears	99–85	Tainan TSG GhostHawks	Taipei City
15:00 (UTC+8)	Scoring by quarter: 30–22, 24–17, 26–21, 19–25
	Pts: Chiang Yu-An 23; Rebs: Chou Po-Hsun 16; Asts: Chou Po-Hsun 4	boxscore	Pts: Ku Mao Wei-Chia 19; Rebs: Wu Hung-Hsing 9 Asts: Li Han-Sheng 8	Arena: Taipei Heping Basketball Gymnasium

September 22, 2022	Chinese Taipei National Training Team	65–86	TaiwanBeer HeroBears	Taipei City
17:00 (UTC+8)	Scoring by quarter: 20–23, 19–17, 13–24, 13–22
	Pts: Chiang Chun 13; Rebs: William Artino 12; Asts: Chen Li-Sheng 4	boxscore	Pts: Chu I-Tsung 18; Rebs: Chou Po-Hsun 7 Asts: Tsao Xun-Xiang 6	Arena: Taipei Heping Basketball Gymnasium

September 24, 2022	TaiwanBeer HeroBears	78–71	PLG RISING STARS	Taipei City
19:00 (UTC+8)	Scoring by quarter: 18–14, 16–20, 21–21, 23–16
	Pts: Chiang Yu-An, Chou Po-Hsun 19; Rebs: Fan Shih-En 10; Asts: Lee Chi-Wei 4	boxscore	Pts: Chen Fan Po-Yen 15; Rebs: Chen Fan Po-Yen 8 Asts: three players 3	Arena: Taipei Heping Basketball Gymnasium

=== Quarterfinals ===
September 25, 2022	TaiwanBeer HeroBears	90–61	Taoyuan Leopards	Taipei City
19:00 (UTC+8)	Scoring by quarter: 27–14, 25–20, 25–9, 16–18
	Pts: Tsao Xun-Xiang 21; Rebs: Fan Shih-En, Chou Po-Hsun 8 Asts: Tsao Xun-Xiang 5	boxscore	Pts: Chen Hsiao-Jung 15; Rebs: Tseng Pin-Fu 12; Asts: Cheng Wei, Lu Chieh-Min 4	Arena: Taipei Heping Basketball Gymnasium

=== Semifinals ===
September 26, 2022	Tainan TSG GhostHawks	87–89	TaiwanBeer HeroBears	Taipei City
19:00 (UTC+8)	Scoring by quarter: 19–20, 17–26, 26–19, 25–24
	Pts: Ku Mao Wei-Chia 17; Rebs: Wu Tai-Hao 9 Asts: Ku Mao Wei-Chia 8	boxscore	Pts: Lee Chi-Wei 30; Rebs: Fan Shih-En 8 Asts: Chiang Yu-An 7	Arena: Taipei Heping Basketball Gymnasium

=== Finals ===
September 27, 2022	New Taipei CTBC DEA	74–87	TaiwanBeer HeroBears	Taipei City
19:00 (UTC+8)	Scoring by quarter: 15–21, 20–29, 28–14, 11–23
	Pts: Mohammad Al Bachir Gadiaga 22; Rebs: Mohammad Al Bachir Gadiaga 11; Asts: Lin Wei-Han 9	boxscore	Pts: Huang Tsung-Han 27; Rebs: Chou Po-Hsun 12; Asts: Lee Chi-Wei 6	Arena: Taipei Heping Basketball Gymnasium

== Preseason ==
=== Game log ===
2022 preseason game log
Total: 1–1 (home: 1–0; road: 0–1)
Preseason : 1–1 (home: 1–0; road: 0–1)

Game	Date	Team	Score	High points	High rebounds	High assists	Location Attendance	Record
1	October 15	@ GhostHawks	L 114–118	Stephan Hicks (22)	Milenko Veljković (11)	Chiang Yu-An (8)	Xinzhuang Gymnasium; 3,145	0–1
2	October 16	Leopards	W 106–90	Stephan Hicks (28)	Milenko Veljković (13); Chou Po-Hsun (13)	Chiang Yu-An (4); Tsao Xun-Xiang (4)	Xinzhuang Gymnasium; 1,063	1–1

Color： Win Lose
Schedule

== Regular season ==
=== Standings ===
Pos	Team	Pld	W	L	PCT	GB	Qualification
1	New Taipei CTBC DEA	30	25	5	.833	—	Advance to semifinals
2	Tainan TSG GhostHawks	30	19	11	.633	6	Advance to semifinals
3	Kaohsiung Aquas	30	16	14	.533	9	Advance to semifinals
4	TaiwanBeer HeroBears	30	16	14	.533	9	Advance to play-in
5	Taichung Suns	30	8	22	.267	17	Advance to play-in
6	Taoyuan Leopards	30	6	24	.200	19	

Source: T1 League

=== Game log ===
2022–23 regular season game log
Total: 16–14 (home: 9–6; road: 7–8)
November : 2–1 (home: 1–1; road: 1–0)

Game	Date	Team	Score	High points	High rebounds	High assists	Location Attendance	Record
1	November 12	Aquas	L 101–111	Branden Dawson (27)	Branden Dawson (10)	Tsao Xun-Xiang (6)	University of Taipei Tianmu Campus Gymnasium; 3,129	0–1
2	November 13	Suns	W 109–94	Chu I-Tsung (30)	Branden Dawson (14)	Tsao Xun-Xiang (12)	University of Taipei Tianmu Campus Gymnasium; 2,156	1–1
3	November 27	@ Aquas	W 98–97	Cleanthony Early (31)	Branden Dawson (17)	Branden Dawson (6)	Kaohsiung Arena; 6,071	2–1

December : 2–3 (home: 1–1; road: 1–2)

Game	Date	Team	Score	High points	High rebounds	High assists	Location Attendance	Record
4	December 3	DEA	L 103–117	Cleanthony Early (28)	Branden Dawson (17)	Chiang Yu-An (7)	University of Taipei Tianmu Campus Gymnasium; 3,168	2–2
5	December 4	GhostHawks	W 112–108	Cleanthony Early (56)	Milenko Veljković (13)	Cleanthony Early (7)	University of Taipei Tianmu Campus Gymnasium; 2,226	3–2
6	December 10	@ GhostHawks	L 99–120	Cleanthony Early (33)	Chou Po-Hsun (7)	Chiang Yu-An (5); Cleanthony Early (5)	Chia Nan University of Pharmacy and Science Shao Tsung Gymnasium; 1,023	3–3
7	December 17	@ Suns	W 92–80	Cleanthony Early (38)	Cleanthony Early (11)	Cleanthony Early (6)	National Taiwan University of Sport Gymnasium; 1,813	4–3
8	December 25	@ DEA	L 81–88	Branden Dawson (23)	Branden Dawson (17)	Chiang Yu-An (6)	Xinzhuang Gymnasium; 3,401	4–4

January : 3–2 (home: 3–1; road: 0–1)

Game	Date	Team	Score	High points	High rebounds	High assists	Location Attendance	Record
9	January 1	GhostHawks	W 112–109	Lee Chi-Wei (33)	Branden Dawson (15)	Chiang Yu-An (10)	University of Taipei Tianmu Campus Gymnasium; 2,075	5–4
10	January 2	DEA	L 75–112	Branden Dawson (22)	Prince Ibeh (12)	Chiang Yu-An (6)	University of Taipei Tianmu Campus Gymnasium; 2,323	5–5
11	January 7	Suns	W 105–89	Perry Jones (29)	Branden Dawson (9); Prince Ibeh (9)	Perry Jones (7)	University of Taipei Tianmu Campus Gymnasium; 1,093	6–5
12	January 8	Leopards	W 114–111	Tsao Xun-Xiang (25)	Branden Dawson (7); Tsao Xun-Xiang (7)	Huang Jhen (3); Perry Jones (3); Branden Dawson (3); Chiang Yu-An (3); Lee Chi-Wei (3); Tsao Xun-Xiang (3)	University of Taipei Tianmu Campus Gymnasium; 4,396	7–5
13	January 15	@ GhostHawks	L 102–105	Tsao Xun-Xiang (24)	Branden Dawson (13)	Tsao Xun-Xiang (6)	Chia Nan University of Pharmacy and Science Shao Tsung Gymnasium; 935	7–6

February : 2–4 (home: 1–3; road: 1–1)

Game	Date	Team	Score	High points	High rebounds	High assists	Location Attendance	Record
14	February 4	@ Aquas	L 117–122 (OT)	Branden Dawson (28); Chiang Yu-An (28)	Branden Dawson (17)	Branden Dawson (7)	Kaohsiung Arena; 4,689	7–7
15	February 11	Suns	L 90–95	Branden Dawson (23)	Branden Dawson (16)	Perry Jones (7)	University of Taipei Tianmu Campus Gymnasium; 1,096	7–8
16	February 12	GhostHawks	L 110–120	Chiang Yu-An (42)	Prince Ibeh (9)	Perry Jones (5); Chiang Yu-An (5)	University of Taipei Tianmu Campus Gymnasium; 1,221	7–9
17	February 18	Aquas	W 78–74	Chiang Yu-An (16)	Branden Dawson (11)	Chiang Yu-An (9)	University of Taipei Tianmu Campus Gymnasium; 2,604	8–9
18	February 19	Leopards	L 108–120	Chiang Yu-An (27)	Branden Dawson (10)	Chiang Yu-An (6)	University of Taipei Tianmu Campus Gymnasium; 3,546	8–10
19	February 27	@ Suns	W 97–91	Perry Jones (27)	Branden Dawson (17)	Chu I-Tsung (6)	National Taiwan University of Sport Gymnasium; 2,241	9–10

March : 2–3 (home: 0–0; road: 2–3)

Game	Date	Team	Score	High points	High rebounds	High assists	Location Attendance	Record
20	March 5	@ GhostHawks	L 95–111	Perry Jones (28)	Perry Jones (9)	Chiang Yu-An (7)	Chia Nan University of Pharmacy and Science Shao Tsung Gymnasium; 1,249	9–11
21	March 8	@ Aquas	L 97–109	Michael Qualls (43)	Michael Qualls (11)	Chiang Yu-An (10)	Kaohsiung Arena; 2,858	9–12
22	March 12	@ Leopards	W 110–95	Michael Qualls (39)	Branden Dawson (14)	Chiang Yu-An (8)	National Taiwan Sport University Arena; 7,580	10–12
23	March 19	@ Leopards	W 99–98	Michael Qualls (37)	Chou Po-Hsun (9); Michael Qualls (9)	Tsao Xun-Xiang (7)	National Taiwan Sport University Arena; 8,253	11–12
24	March 25	@ DEA	L 86–101	Michael Qualls (27)	Branden Dawson (15)	Chiang Yu-An (5)	Xinzhuang Gymnasium; 4,183	11–13

April : 5–1 (home: 3–0; road: 2–1)

Game	Date	Team	Score	High points	High rebounds	High assists	Location Attendance	Record
25	April 2	@ Leopards	W 117–92	Michael Qualls (33)	Michael Qualls (15)	Michael Qualls (10)	National Taiwan Sport University Arena; 7,382	12–13
26	April 3	@ DEA	L 88–103	Chou Po-Hsun (16); Lee Chi-Wei (16)	Hasheem Thabeet (16)	Tsao Xun-Xiang (7)	Xinzhuang Gymnasium; 3,772	12–14
27	April 8	DEA	W 112–96	Michael Qualls (34)	Michael Qualls (11)	Chiang Yu-An (12)	Fu Jen Catholic University Chung Mei Auditorium; 1,373	13–14
28	April 9	Aquas	W 99–87	Michael Qualls (37)	Michael Qualls (21)	Perry Jones (6)	Fu Jen Catholic University Chung Mei Auditorium; 1,178	14–14
29	April 15	@ Suns	W 98–95	Lee Chi-Wei (23)	Perry Jones (18)	Chiang Yu-An (13)	National Taiwan University of Sport Gymnasium; 1,709	15–14
30	April 22	Leopards	W 93–86	Hasheem Thabeet (32)	Hasheem Thabeet (14)	Tsao Xun-Xiang (8)	Fu Jen Catholic University Chung Mei Auditorium; 1,989	16–14

Color： Win Lose
Schedule

== Playoffs ==
=== Game log ===
2023 playoffs game log
Total: 0–2 (home: 0–1; road: 0–1)
Play-in : 0–2 (home: 0–1; road: 0–1)

Game	Date	Team	Score	High points	High rebounds	High assists	Location Attendance	Series
1	April 25	@ Suns	L 130–138 (2OT)	Michael Qualls (37)	Hasheem Thabeet (25)	Chiang Yu-An (14)	National Taiwan University of Sport Gymnasium; 847	1–1
2	April 27	Suns	L 118–120	Perry Jones (33)	Perry Jones (13)	Perry Jones (8); Chiang Yu-An (8)	University of Taipei Tianmu Campus Gymnasium; 991	1–2

Color： Win Lose
Schedule

=== Play-in note ===
- The fourth seed, TaiwanBeer HeroBears, was awarded a one-win advantage before the play-in series.

== Player statistics ==
Legend
GP	Games played	MPG	Minutes per game	FG%	Field goal percentage
3P%	3-point field goal percentage	FT%	Free throw percentage	RPG	Rebounds per game
APG	Assists per game	SPG	Steals per game	BPG	Blocks per game
PPG	Points per game		Led the league

=== Regular season ===
Player	GP	MPG	PPG	FG%	3P%	FT%	RPG	APG	SPG	BPG
Huang Jhen	21	12:09	3.2	43.1%	35.7%	40.0%	1.3	1.1	0.5	0.0
Prince Ibeh^{≠‡}	14	28:33	6.3	49.3%	0.0%	32.7%	6.9	1.1	1.2	2.1
Matt Hodgson^{‡}	2	23:00	8.5	66.7%	0.0%	50.0%	6.5	1.5	0.5	1.5
Milenko Veljković^{‡}	6	26:22	6.7	40.6%	0.0%	70.0%	7.2	0.7	0.0	1.0
Perry Jones^{≠}	18	37:04	17.4	39.9%	27.0%	63.9%	7.7	4.2	1.3	1.1
Huang Tsung-Han	26	19:54	7.3	38.9%	36.4%	84.0%	1.5	0.7	0.3	0.1
Branden Dawson^{‡}	21	32:52	19.0	47.0%	18.8%	49.1%	11.9	3.1	2.9	1.6
Chiang Yu-An	24	40:09	16.8	45.0%	39.5%	75.8%	4.3	6.3	2.0	0.1
Fan Shih-En	8	9:42	2.5	57.1%	0.0%	66.7%	2.3	0.5	0.1	0.3
Lu Tsai Yu-Lun^{‡}	2	2:34	1.5	33.3%	0.0%	100.0%	0.5	0.0	0.0	0.0
Yang Tian-You^{≠}	5	6:34	1.2	20.0%	25.0%	50.0%	1.0	0.6	0.2	0.0
Chou Po-Hsun	22	26:55	6.6	47.0%	32.1%	65.1%	5.7	1.3	0.9	0.3
Cleanthony Early^{≠‡}	6	37:19	33.2	43.9%	25.4%	77.3%	7.5	5.0	1.5	0.8
Chu I-Tsung	29	18:52	6.6	42.0%	33.3%	63.3%	3.0	1.2	0.7	0.1
Liang Hao-Zhen^{≠}	1	0:49	0.0	0.0%	0.0%	0.0%	0.0	0.0	0.0	0.0
Hasheem Thabeet^{≠}	8	26:50	14.5	57.7%	0.0%	60.5%	10.4	1.5	0.6	1.5
Michael Qualls^{≠}	10	36:48	30.6	44.3%	38.0%	83.7%	10.5	3.3	2.6	1.1
Tsao Xun-Xiang	28	16:57	7.0	46.2%	36.4%	67.1%	2.2	3.0	0.8	0.0
Lee Chi-Wei	30	32:57	10.0	37.7%	34.0%	75.0%	2.6	1.9	1.0	0.2

^{‡} Left during the season
^{≠} Acquired during the season

=== Play-in ===
Player	GP	MPG	PPG	FG%	3P%	FT%	RPG	APG	SPG	BPG
Huang Jhen	1	5:52	3.0	100.0%	100.0%	0.0%	1.0	0.0	1.0	0.0
Perry Jones	2	31:04	23.0	60.7%	44.4%	80.0%	9.0	5.0	1.0	1.0
Huang Tsung-Han	2	19:10	9.0	38.5%	30.0%	71.4%	1.0	0.5	0.5	0.0
Chiang Yu-An	2	45:27	26.0	50.0%	38.9%	76.5%	4.5	11.0	1.5	0.5
Fan Shih-En	Did not play									
Yang Tian-You	Did not play									
Chou Po-Hsun	2	25:09	3.0	50.0%	0.0%	100.0%	3.5	2.0	0.0	0.0
Chu I-Tsung	2	23:54	7.0	62.5%	60.0%	50.0%	1.0	2.0	1.5	0.0
Liang Hao-Zhen	Did not play									
Hasheem Thabeet	2	45:25	15.0	60.0%	0.0%	46.2%	17.5	0.5	1.0	2.5
Michael Qualls	2	29:31	27.5	42.5%	36.4%	56.5%	6.0	3.5	1.5	0.5
Tsao Xun-Xiang	2	6:54	2.0	66.7%	0.0%	0.0%	0.5	3.0	0.5	0.0
Lee Chi-Wei	2	35:29	10.0	29.2%	23.5%	100.0%	5.5	2.5	0.0	0.0

- Reference：

== Transactions ==
=== Overview ===
Players added

Via draft

- Lu Tsai Yu-Lun
- Tsao Xun-Xiang

Via free agency

- Branden Dawson
- Cleanthony Early
- Stephan Hicks
- Matt Hodgson
- Prince Ibeh
- Perry Jones
- Liang Hao-Zhen
- Michael Qualls
- Hasheem Thabeet
- Milenko Veljković

Transfer from Taiwan Beer

- Yang Tian-You
Players lost

Via free agency

- Chien Chao-Yi
- Samuel Deguara
- Ronald Delph
- Tyler Lamb
- Diamond Stone

Waived

- Branden Dawson
- Cleanthony Early
- Stephan Hicks
- Matt Hodgson
- Prince Ibeh
- Milenko Veljković

Transfer to Taiwan Beer

- Wang Hao-Chi

Out on loan

- Lu Tsai Yu-Lun

=== Transfer from Taiwan Beer ===
Date	Player	Ref.
February 10, 2023	Yang Tian-You	

=== Transfer to Taiwan Beer ===
Date	Player	Ref.
October 17, 2022	Wang Hao-Chi	

=== Out on loan ===
Date	Player	Loan team	Loan season	Ref.
February 2, 2023	Lu Tsai Yu-Lun	Taoyuan Leopards	2022–23 T1 League season	

=== Free agency ===
==== Additions ====
Date	Player	Contract terms	Former team	Ref.
July 28, 2022	Tsao Xun-Xiang	—N/a	(Taiwan) NTUA	
August 5, 2022	Lu Tsai Yu-Lun	—N/a	(Japan) Sendai	
August 26, 2022	Stephan Hicks	—N/a	(Taiwan) Formosa Taishin Dreamers	
September 2, 2022	Matt Hodgson	—N/a	(Australia) Perth Wildcats	
September 12, 2022	Milenko Veljković	—N/a	(Bosnia and Herzegovina) HKK Zrinjski Mostar	
November 2, 2022	Branden Dawson	—N/a	(Taiwan) Hsinchu JKO Lioneers	
November 25, 2022	Cleanthony Early	US$12,000 per month	(Venezuela) Gladiadores de Anzoátegui	
December 14, 2022	Prince Ibeh	—N/a	(Philippines) NorthPort Batang Pier	
January 6, 2023	Perry Jones	—N/a	(Taiwan) Taipei Fubon Braves	
February 1, 2023	Liang Hao-Zhen	—N/a	Taiwan Beer	
March 3, 2023	Michael Qualls	—N/a	(Philippines) Rain or Shine Elasto Painters	
March 13, 2023	Hasheem Thabeet	—N/a	(China) Sichuan Blue Whales	

==== Subtractions ====
Date	Player	Reason	New team	Ref.
July 7, 2022	Ronald Delph	Contract expired	(Venezuela) Marinos B.B.C.	
July 8, 2022	Diamond Stone	Contract expired	(Venezuela) Cocodrilos de Caracas	
August 9, 2022	Samuel Deguara	Contract expired	(Taiwan) Tainan TSG GhostHawks	
September 12, 2022	Tyler Lamb	Contract expired	(Thailand) Hi-tech basketball club	
October 18, 2022	Chien Chao-Yi	Contract expired	Taiwan Beer	
October 28, 2022	Stephan Hicks	Injury	(United States) Fort Wayne Champs	
November 26, 2022	Matt Hodgson	Injury	(Australia) Ipswich Force	
December 13, 2022	Milenko Veljković	Contract terminated	(Czech Republic) BC Geosan Kolín	
January 5, 2023	Cleanthony Early	Contract terminated	Dynamo Lebanon	
March 6, 2023	Prince Ibeh	Contract terminated	(Venezuela) Guaros de Lara	
April 4, 2023	Branden Dawson	Contract terminated	(Venezuela) Spartans Distrito Capital	

== Awards ==
=== Yearly awards ===
Recipient	Award	Ref.
Chiang Yu-An	All-T1 League First Team	
