= 2022–23 Taichung Suns season =

Taiwanese professional basketball season

- President: Sun Tzu-Chuan
- General Manager: Wang Wei-Chieh
- Head Coach: Alberto Garcia (preseason); Chris Gavina (regular season and playoffs)
- Arena: National Taiwan University of Sport Gymnasium

T1 League results
- Record: 8–22 (26.7%)
- Place: 5th
- Playoffs finish: Semifinals (lost to DEA, 0–3)

Player records
- Points: Lu Kuan-Hsuan 11.2
- Rebounds: Su Yi-Chin 3.6
- Assists: Delgerchuluun Bayasgalan 3.9

The 2022–23 Taichung Suns season was the franchise's second season, its second season in the T1 League.

On July 1, 2022, the Taoyuan Pilots hired Iurgi Caminos, the head coach of the Taichung Wagor Suns, as their new head coach. On September 18, the Suns promoted Alberto Garcia, the assistant coach of the Taichung Wagor Suns, as their new head coach. On October 25, the Suns hired Chris Gavina as their new head coach.

== Draft ==
Round	Player	Position(s)	School / club team
1	Tung Yung-Chuan	Forward	NTNU
3	Lee Ming-Xiu	Guard	NTUS

- Reference：

On March 16, 2022, the Suns' 2022 and 2023 second-round picks were traded to TaiwanBeer HeroBears in exchange for Chou Tzu-Hua.

== Roster ==
2022–23 Taichung Suns roster
Players
Coaches

Pos.	No.	Nat.	Name	Ht.	Wt.	Age	From
C	0	(Saint Vincent and the Grenadines)	Austin Derrick (I)	1.98 m (6 ft 6 in)	115 kg (254 lb)	27 – 31 July 1995	UCH
PF/C	1	(United States)	Arnett Moultrie (I)	2.10 m (6 ft 11 in)	118 kg (260 lb)	32 – 18 November 1990	Mississippi State
PG	3	(Taiwan)	Ting Sheng-Ju	1.74 m (5 ft 9 in)	70 kg (154 lb)	24 – 22 August 1998	St. Francis
PG	4	(Taiwan)	Kao Meng-Wei	1.75 m (5 ft 9 in)	70 kg (154 lb)	26 – 13 September 1996	NTCUST
PG	5	(Taiwan)	Peng Chun-Yen	1.85 m (6 ft 1 in)	84 kg (185 lb)	33 – 5 December 1989	MDU
PG	6	(Mongolia)	Delgerchuluun Bayasgalan (SFS)	1.81 m (5 ft 11 in)	75 kg (165 lb)	25 – 30 October 1997	HDUT
SF	8	(Taiwan)	Chen Wen-Hung	1.85 m (6 ft 1 in)	80 kg (176 lb)	31 – 14 July 1991	NTSU
SG	11	(Taiwan)	Yang Cheng-Han	1.86 m (6 ft 1 in)	77 kg (170 lb)	23 – 10 October 1999	FJU
PG	13	(Taiwan)	Lee Ming-Xiu	1.82 m (6 ft 0 in)	82 kg (181 lb)	22 – 1 June 2000	NTUS
SF	14	(Taiwan)	Tung Yung-Chuan	1.91 m (6 ft 3 in)	87 kg (192 lb)	23 – 14 October 1999	NTNU
G/F	20	(United States) (Taiwan)	Derek King	1.90 m (6 ft 3 in)	90 kg (198 lb)	29 – 13 September 1993	UC Berkeley
SG	24	(United States)	Rayvonte Rice (I)	1.93 m (6 ft 4 in)	109 kg (240 lb)	30 – 14 July 1992	Illinois
PF/C	34	(United States)	Keith Benson (I)	2.11 m (6 ft 11 in)	112 kg (247 lb)	34 – 13 August 1988	Oakland
PF	41	(Taiwan)	Su Yi-Chin	2.00 m (6 ft 7 in)	95 kg (209 lb)	29 – 29 December 1993	MDU
SG	42	(Taiwan)	Lu Kuan-Hsuan	1.85 m (6 ft 1 in)	84 kg (185 lb)	28 – 2 April 1995	NTNU
PF	45	(Taiwan)	Wen Li-Huang	2.02 m (6 ft 8 in)	96 kg (212 lb)	29 – 26 October 1993	ISU
PG	76	(Taiwan)	Lin Ming-Yi	1.77 m (5 ft 10 in)	72 kg (159 lb)	27 – 27 March 1996	MDU

Head coach

- (Philippines) Chris Gavina

Assistant coach(es)

- (Philippines) Niño Canaleta
- (Taiwan) Chou Ying-Chou
- (Taiwan) Hsu Chih-Chao

Strength & conditioning coach(es)

- (Taiwan) Weng Chien-Kai

Athletic trainer(s)

- (Taiwan) Huang Chi-Chun

Team manager

- (Taiwan) Wang Wei-Chieh

Legend

- (C) Team captain
- (I) Import player
- (SFS) Special foreign student
- Injured

- Roster
Updated: March 8, 2023

== 2022 interleague play ==
On September 13, 2022, Taichung Wagor Suns announced that Delgerchuluun Bayasgalan, Austin Derrick and Chang Chia-Jung joined to the team as the testing player in these invitational games.

=== Standings ===
Pos	Team	Pld	W	L	PCT	GB	Qualification
1	New Taipei CTBC DEA	5	5	0	1.000	—	Advance to Quarterfinals
2	Bank of Taiwan	5	3	2	.600	2	Advance to Quarterfinals
3	Hsinchu JKO Lioneers	5	3	2	.600	2	
4	Taoyuan Leopards	5	2	3	.400	3	
5	Taichung Suns	5	2	3	.400	3	
6	Taiwan Beer	5	0	5	.000	5	

Source: Official website

=== Group match ===
September 18, 2022	Taichung Suns	94–81	Bank of Taiwan	Taipei City
17:00 (UTC+8)	Scoring by quarter: 23–27, 30–11, 22–21, 19–22
	Pts: Lu Kuan-Hsuan, Su Yi-Chin 21; Rebs: Su Yi-Chin 12; Asts: Su Yi-Chin 7	boxscore	Pts: Chang Chia-He 19; Rebs: Chen You-Hsu 8 Asts: Kao Chien-Yi 5	Arena: Taipei Heping Basketball Gymnasium

September 19, 2022	Taiwan Beer	71–91	Taichung Suns	Taipei City
19:00 (UTC+8)	Scoring by quarter: 17–20, 21–26, 18–24, 15–21
	Pts: Chen Chao-Hao 16; Rebs: Humphery Gabriel 10; Asts: Chen Chao-Hao 4	boxscore	Pts: Delgerchuluun Bayasgalan 19; Rebs: Sun Szu-Yao 8 Asts: Lu Kuan-Hsuan 9	Arena: Taipei Heping Basketball Gymnasium

September 21, 2022	Taichung Suns	74–83	Taoyuan Leopards	Taipei City
13:00 (UTC+8)	Scoring by quarter: 9–21, 24–24, 21–15, 20–23
	Pts: Lu Kuan-Hsuan 19; Rebs: Lu Kuan-Hsuan 6 Asts: Delgerchuluun Bayasgalan 8	boxscore	Pts: Chen Hsiao-Jung 26; Rebs: Liu Yuan-Kai 12; Asts: Lu Chieh-Min 7	Arena: Taipei Heping Basketball Gymnasium

September 23, 2022	Hsinchu JKO Lioneers	80–59	Taichung Suns	Taipei City
15:00 (UTC+8)	Scoring by quarter: 22–15, 18–14, 12–18, 28–12
	Pts: Kuo Shao-Chieh 23; Rebs: Kao Kuo-Hao 12; Asts: Kao Kuo-Hao, Lin Ming-Yi 7	boxscore	Pts: Delgerchuluun Bayasgalan 19; Rebs: Sun Szu-Yao 8 Asts: Chang Chia-Jung 3	Arena: Taipei Heping Basketball Gymnasium

September 24, 2022	New Taipei CTBC DEA	82–50	Taichung Suns	Taipei City
13:00 (UTC+8)	Scoring by quarter: 17–17, 23–4, 27–14, 15–15
	Pts: Tung Fang Yi-Kang, Hsieh Ya-Hsuan 14; Rebs: Mohammad Al Bachir Gadiaga, Wei Chia-Hao 8 Asts: Wei Chia-Hao 9	boxscore	Pts: Su Yi-Chin 20; Rebs: Chang Chia-Jung 7 Asts: three players 2	Arena: Taipei Heping Basketball Gymnasium

== Preseason ==
Delgerchuluun Bayasgalan and Austin Derrick joined to the team as the testing player in these preseason games.

=== Game log ===
2022 preseason game log
Total: 0–2 (home: 0–1; road: 0–1)
Preseason : 0–2 (home: 0–1; road: 0–1)

Game	Date	Team	Score	High points	High rebounds	High assists	Location Attendance	Record
1	October 14	GhostHawks	L 86–115	Wen Li-Huang (22)	Austin Derrick (7); Wen Li-Huang (7)	Delgerchuluun Bayasgalan (7)	Xinzhuang Gymnasium	0–1
2	October 16	@ Aquas	L 62–93	Wen Li-Huang (12)	Tony Bishop (9)	Lu Kuan-Hsuan (6)	Xinzhuang Gymnasium; 1,063	0–2

Color： Win Lose
Schedule

== Regular season ==
=== Standings ===
Pos	Team	Pld	W	L	PCT	GB	Qualification
1	New Taipei CTBC DEA	30	25	5	.833	—	Advance to semifinals
2	Tainan TSG GhostHawks	30	19	11	.633	6	Advance to semifinals
3	Kaohsiung Aquas	30	16	14	.533	9	Advance to semifinals
4	TaiwanBeer HeroBears	30	16	14	.533	9	Advance to play-in
5	Taichung Suns	30	8	22	.267	17	Advance to play-in
6	Taoyuan Leopards	30	6	24	.200	19	

Source: T1 League

=== Game log ===
2022–23 regular season game log
Total: 8–22 (home: 4–11; road: 4–11)
November : 4–2 (home: 3–1; road: 1–1)

Game	Date	Team	Score	High points	High rebounds	High assists	Location Attendance	Record
1	November 5	Aquas	L 79–99	Tony Bishop (22)	Tony Bishop (9); Aaron Geramipoor (9)	Lu Kuan-Hsuan (8)	National Taiwan University of Sport Gymnasium; 2,425	0–1
2	November 6	DEA	W 112–109	Diamond Stone (29)	Tony Bishop (10); Aaron Geramipoor (10)	Lu Kuan-Hsuan (8)	National Taiwan University of Sport Gymnasium; 2,861	1–1
3	November 13	@ HeroBears	L 94–109	Diamond Stone (24)	Tony Bishop (16)	Delgerchuluun Bayasgalan (6)	University of Taipei Tianmu Campus Gymnasium; 2,156	1–2
4	November 20	@ Leopards	W 103–94	Diamond Stone (29)	Tony Bishop (14)	Delgerchuluun Bayasgalan (7)	National Taiwan Sport University Arena; 15,537	2–2
5	November 26	GhostHawks	W 96–93	Tony Bishop (26)	Tony Bishop (14)	Tony Bishop (6)	National Taiwan University of Sport Gymnasium; 1,831	3–2
6	November 27	Leopards	W 93–87	Diamond Stone (37)	Diamond Stone (20)	Lu Kuan-Hsuan (8)	National Taiwan University of Sport Gymnasium; 5,861	4–2

December : 0–4 (home: 0–2; road: 0–2)

Game	Date	Team	Score	High points	High rebounds	High assists	Location Attendance	Record
7	December 3	@ Aquas	L 90–120	Diamond Stone (27)	Tony Bishop (12)	Peng Chun-Yen (5)	Kaohsiung Arena; 2,486	4–3
8	December 17	HeroBears	L 80–92	Aaron Geramipoor (17)	Tony Bishop (10); Aaron Geramipoor (10)	Tony Bishop (9)	National Taiwan University of Sport Gymnasium; 1,813	4–4
9	December 25	@ GhostHawks	L 95–106	Tony Bishop (33)	Tony Bishop (12)	Tony Bishop (6)	Chia Nan University of Pharmacy and Science Shao Tsung Gymnasium; 1,013	4–5
10	December 31	Aquas	L 92–100	Tony Bishop (26)	Marlon Johnson (9); Aaron Geramipoor (9); Tony Bishop (9)	Delgerchuluun Bayasgalan (6)	National Taiwan University of Sport Gymnasium; 1,518	4–6

January : 1–1 (home: 1–0; road: 0–1)

Game	Date	Team	Score	High points	High rebounds	High assists	Location Attendance	Record
11	January 2	Leopards	W 96–71	Tony Bishop (27)	Tony Bishop (16)	Delgerchuluun Bayasgalan (6)	National Taiwan University of Sport Gymnasium; 5,328	5–6
12	January 7	@ HeroBears	L 89–105	Aaron Geramipoor (22)	Aaron Geramipoor (13)	Su Yi-Chin (6)	University of Taipei Tianmu Campus Gymnasium; 1,093	5–7
—	January 14	@ Aquas	Postponed					

February : 1–5 (home: 0–4; road: 1–1)

Game	Date	Team	Score	High points	High rebounds	High assists	Location Attendance	Record
13	February 4	DEA	L 100–110	Marlon Johnson (33)	Aaron Geramipoor (14)	Ting Sheng-Ju (7)	National Taiwan University of Sport Gymnasium; 1,829	5–8
14	February 5	Leopards	L 90–110	Ting Sheng-Ju (21)	Jordan Tolbert (11)	Marlon Johnson (6); Jordan Tolbert (6)	National Taiwan University of Sport Gymnasium; 6,243	5–9
15	February 11	@ HeroBears	W 95–90	Rayvonte Rice (46)	Marlon Johnson (16)	Ting Sheng-Ju (4); Marlon Johnson (4)	University of Taipei Tianmu Campus Gymnasium; 1,096	6–9
16	February 19	@ GhostHawks	L 104–135	Rayvonte Rice (37)	Jordan Tolbert (10)	Ting Sheng-Ju (5)	Chia Nan University of Pharmacy and Science Shao Tsung Gymnasium; 1,314	6–10
17	February 25	GhostHawks	L 84–91	Aaron Geramipoor (23)	Raphiael Putney (12)	Lu Kuan-Hsuan (8)	National Taiwan University of Sport Gymnasium; 1,863	6–11
18	February 27	HeroBears	L 91–97	Rayvonte Rice (35)	Aaron Geramipoor (10)	Lin Ming-Yi (6)	National Taiwan University of Sport Gymnasium; 2,241	6–12

March : 1–6 (home: 0–2; road: 1–4)

Game	Date	Team	Score	High points	High rebounds	High assists	Location Attendance	Record
19	March 4	@ DEA	L 88–96	Rayvonte Rice (29)	Rayvonte Rice (14)	Rayvonte Rice (3); Ting Sheng-Ju (3)	Xinzhuang Gymnasium; 3,308	6–13
20	March 11	@ Aquas	L 92–97	Arnett Moultrie (19)	Keith Benson (19)	Ting Sheng-Ju (6)	Kaohsiung Arena; 5,227	6–14
21	March 18	GhostHawks	L 91–93	Rayvonte Rice (36)	Arnett Moultrie (15)	Lu Kuan-Hsuan (6)	National Taiwan University of Sport Gymnasium; 1,626	6–15
22	March 19	DEA	L 82–97	Rayvonte Rice (23)	Arnett Moultrie (10)	Arnett Moultrie (8)	National Taiwan University of Sport Gymnasium; 1,854	6–16
23	—	@ Aquas	L 0–20	Called Lose				6–17
24	March 26	@ DEA	L 93–112	Rayvonte Rice (30)	Arnett Moultrie (14)	Peng Chun-Yen (5)	Xinzhuang Gymnasium; 3,271	6–18
25	March 31	@ Leopards	W 101–97	Rayvonte Rice (38)	Keith Benson (13)	Wen Li-Huang (4)	National Taiwan Sport University Arena; 6,947	7–18

April : 1–4 (home: 0–2; road: 1–2)

Game	Date	Team	Score	High points	High rebounds	High assists	Location Attendance	Record
26	April 2	@ GhostHawks	L 97–118	Rayvonte Rice (33)	Arnett Moultrie (9)	Delgerchuluun Bayasgalan (6)	Chia Nan University of Pharmacy and Science Shao Tsung Gymnasium; 920	7–19
27	April 8	@ Leopards	W 97–93	Rayvonte Rice (52)	Rayvonte Rice (9)	Delgerchuluun Bayasgalan (6)	National Taiwan Sport University Arena; 9,422	8–19
28	April 15	HeroBears	L 95–98	Arnett Moultrie (19)	Keith Benson (14)	Arnett Moultrie (4); Delgerchuluun Bayasgalan (4); Rayvonte Rice (4)	National Taiwan University of Sport Gymnasium; 1,709	8–20
29	April 16	Aquas	L 104–111	Rayvonte Rice (25)	Arnett Moultrie (10)	Delgerchuluun Bayasgalan (10)	National Taiwan University of Sport Gymnasium; 1,763	8–21
30	April 23	@ DEA	L 79–95	Arnett Moultrie (16)	Keith Benson (10)	Ting Sheng-Ju (8)	Xinzhuang Gymnasium; 3,186	8–22

Color： Win Lose Postponed
Schedule

=== Regular season note ===
- Due to the Taichung Suns could not reach the minimum player number, the T1 League declared that the game on January 14 would be postponed.
- Due to the Taichung Suns could not cooperate with the make-up game, the T1 League announced that the game on January 14 was called win to Kaohsiung Aquas.

== Playoffs ==
=== Game log ===
2023 playoffs game log
Total: 2–3 (home: 1–1; road: 1–2)
Play-in : 2–0 (home: 1–0; road: 1–0)

Game	Date	Team	Score	High points	High rebounds	High assists	Location Attendance	Series
1	April 25	HeroBears	W 138–130 (2OT)	Rayvonte Rice (44)	Rayvonte Rice (12)	Rayvonte Rice (11)	National Taiwan University of Sport Gymnasium; 847	1–1
2	April 27	@ HeroBears	W 120–118	Rayvonte Rice (46)	Arnett Moultrie (15)	Ting Sheng-Ju (8)	University of Taipei Tianmu Campus Gymnasium; 991	2–1

Semifinals : 0–3 (home: 0–1; road: 0–2)

Game	Date	Team	Score	High points	High rebounds	High assists	Location Attendance	Series
1	May 1	@ DEA	L 78–126	Rayvonte Rice (13)	Arnett Moultrie (17)	Lin Ming-Yi (4)	Xinzhuang Gymnasium; 3,253	0–1
2	May 4	DEA	L 83–110	Rayvonte Rice (21)	Arnett Moultrie (10); Keith Benson (10)	Ting Sheng-Ju (11)	National Taiwan University of Sport Gymnasium; 1,333	0–2
3	May 7	@ DEA	L 86–130	Rayvonte Rice (20)	Keith Benson (12)	Ting Sheng-Ju (8)	Xinzhuang Gymnasium; 3,345	0–3

Color： Win Lose
Schedule

=== Play-in note ===
- The fourth seed, TaiwanBeer HeroBears, was awarded a one-win advantage before the play-in series.

== Player statistics ==
Legend
GP	Games played	MPG	Minutes per game	FG%	Field goal percentage
3P%	3-point field goal percentage	FT%	Free throw percentage	RPG	Rebounds per game
APG	Assists per game	SPG	Steals per game	BPG	Blocks per game
PPG	Points per game		Led the league

=== Regular season ===
Player	GP	MPG	PPG	FG%	3P%	FT%	RPG	APG	SPG	BPG
Austin Derrick	1	18:36	6.0	33.3%	0.0%	66.7%	9.0	0.0	0.0	0.0
Arnett Moultrie^{≠}	10	35:50	20.2	54.2%	38.5%	77.4%	10.1	2.3	1.6	0.7
Tony Bishop^{‡}	12	35:26	22.2	46.0%	34.7%	71.8%	11.1	4.5	2.2	0.4
Ting Sheng-Ju	8	25:01	6.0	27.8%	20.0%	66.7%	2.5	4.6	1.1	0.0
Kao Meng-Wei	Did not play									
Peng Chun-Yen^{≠}	9	12:17	0.0	0.0%	0.0%	0.0%	2.1	2.4	0.8	0.0
Delgerchuluun Bayasgalan	28	23:31	6.5	41.6%	28.6%	62.5%	2.5	3.9	1.4	0.1
Chen Wen-Hung	26	19:46	3.3	41.7%	26.4%	25.0%	2.1	1.3	0.7	0.0
Niño Canaleta^{≠‡}	1	17:34	1.0	0.0%	0.0%	50.0%	3.0	1.0	0.0	0.0
Marlon Johnson^{≠‡}	9	30:48	15.3	42.6%	32.7%	66.7%	9.0	3.2	2.0	1.7
Yang Cheng-Han	Did not play									
Raphiael Putney^{≠‡}	3	25:39	7.3	29.0%	9.1%	25.0%	9.0	2.7	1.7	1.3
Lee Ming-Xiu	7	5:47	2.4	25.0%	22.2%	87.5%	0.4	0.4	0.1	0.0
Tung Yung-Chuan	11	8:45	2.4	43.5%	35.7%	50.0%	0.8	0.2	0.1	0.0
Sun Szu-Yao^{‡}	Did not play									
Derek King^{≠}	15	12:38	2.9	25.0%	19.4%	85.7%	1.5	0.5	0.4	0.0
Jordan Tolbert^{≠‡}	4	26:28	12.0	40.4%	23.1%	70.0%	8.3	2.0	1.8	0.5
Chen Ching-Huan^{‡}	11	27:20	4.1	32.7%	30.8%	50.0%	1.9	1.5	0.6	0.4
Rayvonte Rice^{≠}	14	36:19	30.0	37.4%	36.8%	78.3%	7.3	2.9	2.2	0.3
Aaron Geramipoor	15	33:10	17.4	52.9%	20.0%	60.0%	9.4	2.1	1.1	0.4
Diamond Stone^{‡}	8	28:32	22.5	43.6%	43.4%	67.7%	9.6	2.0	1.1	0.8
Keith Benson^{≠}	10	21:28	7.0	39.7%	0.0%	54.1%	9.5	1.0	0.7	0.5
Su Yi-Chin	25	25:34	7.8	36.6%	31.7%	71.1%	3.6	2.0	1.0	0.2
Lu Kuan-Hsuan	29	32:12	11.2	41.7%	41.6%	77.8%	2.2	3.1	1.6	0.0
Wen Li-Huang	28	12:17	3.1	34.7%	24.0%	63.2%	2.3	0.8	0.3	0.1
Lin Ming-Yi^{≠}	14	14:29	2.6	31.1%	36.8%	50.0%	1.7	1.9	0.6	0.0

^{‡} Left during the season
^{≠} Acquired during the season

=== Play-in ===
Player	GP	MPG	PPG	FG%	3P%	FT%	RPG	APG	SPG	BPG
Austin Derrick	Did not play									
Arnett Moultrie	2	40:38	20.0	48.6%	40.0%	66.7%	13.0	2.5	0.5	2.0
Ting Sheng-Ju	2	23:47	11.5	53.8%	50.0%	100.0%	2.5	5.0	1.0	0.0
Kao Meng-Wei	Did not play									
Peng Chun-Yen	Did not play									
Delgerchuluun Bayasgalan	2	10:15	3.0	66.7%	100.0%	50.0%	1.0	1.5	0.5	0.0
Chen Wen-Hung	2	36:12	14.0	63.2%	37.5%	50.0%	4.0	2.5	0.5	0.5
Yang Cheng-Han	Did not play									
Lee Ming-Xiu	Did not play									
Tung Yung-Chuan	Did not play									
Derek King	2	3:58	0.0	0.0%	0.0%	0.0%	0.5	0.5	0.0	0.0
Rayvonte Rice	2	47:34	45.0	45.8%	40.9%	75.0%	8.5	8.5	5.0	0.0
Keith Benson	2	17:47	4.0	37.5%	0.0%	50.0%	4.5	0.5	0.5	0.0
Su Yi-Chin	2	40:19	19.5	57.1%	44.4%	75.0%	9.0	4.0	0.5	0.0
Lu Kuan-Hsuan	2	37:56	12.0	28.0%	40.0%	100.0%	2.5	5.5	1.5	0.0
Wen Li-Huang	1	13:04	0.0	0.0%	0.0%	0.0%	4.0	1.0	1.0	0.0
Lin Ming-Yi	Did not play									

=== Semifinals ===
Player	GP	MPG	PPG	FG%	3P%	FT%	RPG	APG	SPG	BPG
Austin Derrick	Did not play									
Arnett Moultrie	3	31:45	16.7	47.5%	16.7%	68.8%	11.0	0.7	0.7	0.7
Ting Sheng-Ju	3	28:37	7.3	33.3%	30.8%	75.0%	2.3	7.0	0.0	0.0
Kao Meng-Wei	Did not play									
Peng Chun-Yen	2	8:35	1.0	50.0%	0.0%	0.0%	1.0	0.5	0.0	0.0
Delgerchuluun Bayasgalan	3	18:32	5.3	25.0%	7.1%	71.4%	2.3	3.0	0.7	0.0
Chen Wen-Hung	3	16:20	1.0	10.0%	12.5%	0.0%	1.3	0.7	0.7	0.3
Yang Cheng-Han	Did not play									
Lee Ming-Xiu	Did not play									
Tung Yung-Chuan	3	7:52	2.0	16.7%	0.0%	66.7%	1.0	0.3	0.0	0.0
Derek King	2	5:37	5.0	57.1%	50.0%	0.0%	1.5	0.0	0.5	0.0
Rayvonte Rice	3	39:10	18.0	30.4%	15.0%	82.1%	5.3	3.3	2.3	0.0
Keith Benson	3	22:38	12.7	46.7%	0.0%	71.4%	9.7	1.0	0.3	0.3
Su Yi-Chin	3	23:55	8.7	40.0%	7.7%	50.0%	2.0	0.0	0.7	0.0
Lu Kuan-Hsuan	3	31:26	4.7	25.0%	13.3%	0.0%	2.3	1.3	1.7	0.0
Wen Li-Huang	1	7:10	4.0	100.0%	0.0%	50.0%	0.0	0.0	1.0	0.0
Lin Ming-Yi	3	7:49	0.7	20.0%	0.0%	0.0%	1.0	1.3	0.0	0.0

- Reference：

== Transactions ==
On December 23, 2022, Taichung Suns registered Niño Canaleta as import player. On February 10, 2023, Taichung Suns cancelled the registration of Niño Canaleta's playership.

On March 8, 2023, Taichung Suns registered Austin Derrick as import players, and cancelled the registration of Aaron Geramipoor's playership due to the injury.

=== Overview ===
Players added

Via draft

- Lee Ming-Xiu
- Tung Yung-Chuan

Via free agency

- Delgerchuluun Bayasgalan
- Keith Benson
- Tony Bishop
- Niño Canaleta
- Austin Derrick
- Mike Edwards
- Marlon Johnson
- Derek King
- Lin Ming-Yi
- Lu Kuan-Hsuan
- Arnett Moultrie
- Peng Chun-Yen
- Raphiael Putney
- Rayvonte Rice
- Diamond Stone
- Jordan Tolbert
- Wen Li-Huang
Players lost

Via trade

- Yu Chu-Hsiang

Via free agency

- Niño Canaleta
- Chou Tzu-Hua
- Alonzo Gee
- Jordan Heading
- Sani Sakakini
- Anthony Tucker
- Julian Wright

Waived

- Tony Bishop
- Chen Ching-Huan
- Chiu Po-Chang
- Mike Edwards
- Marlon Johnson
- Li Ping-Hung
- Raphiael Putney
- Diamond Stone
- Sun Szu-Yao
- Jordan Tolbert

=== Trades ===
Date	Trade		Ref.
June 20, 2022	To Taichung Wagor Suns: Cash considerations	To Taoyuan Leopards: Yu Chu-Hsiang	

=== Free agency ===
==== Re-signed ====
Date	Player	Contract terms	Ref.
September 9, 2022	Aaron Geramipoor	—N/a	

==== Additions ====
Date	Player	Contract terms	Former team	Ref.
July 8, 2022	Lu Kuan-Hsuan	—N/a	(Taiwan) Yulon Luxgen Dinos	
August 17, 2022	Tung Yung-Chuan	—N/a	(Taiwan) NTNU	
August 19, 2022	Wen Li-Huang	—N/a	(Taiwan) Taoyuan Pilots	
September 30, 2022	Tony Bishop	—N/a	(Philippines) Meralco Bolts	
October 3, 2022	Mike Edwards	—N/a	(Kosovo) KB Trepça	
October 25, 2022	Lee Ming-Xiu	—N/a	(Taiwan) NTUS	
October 25, 2022	Austin Derrick	—N/a	(Taiwan) Kaohsiung Steelers	
October 25, 2022	Diamond Stone	—N/a	(Philippines) San Miguel Beermen	
October 31, 2022	Delgerchuluun Bayasgalan	—N/a	(Taiwan) HDUT	
December 1, 2022	Peng Chun-Yen	—N/a	(Taiwan) Kaohsiung 17LIVE Steelers	
December 24, 2022	Marlon Johnson	—N/a	(Canada) Edmonton Stingers	
January 29, 2023	Lin Ming-Yi	—N/a	(Taiwan) Hsinchu JKO Lioneers	
January 30, 2023	Derek King	—N/a	(Taiwan) Formosa Taishin Dreamers	
February 3, 2023	Jordan Tolbert	—N/a	Taiwan Beer	
February 10, 2023	Rayvonte Rice	—N/a	(Canada) Brampton Honey Badgers	
February 24, 2023	Raphiael Putney	—N/a	(South Africa) Cape Town Tigers	
March 9, 2023	Arnett Moultrie	—N/a	(Canada) Xinjiang Flying Tigers	
March 9, 2023	Keith Benson	—N/a	(Lithuania) Juventus Utena	

==== Subtractions ====
Date	Player	Reason	New team	Ref.
May 29, 2022	Julian Wright	Contract expired	(United States) 3's Company	
July 1, 2022	Jordan Heading	Contract expired	(Japan) Nagasaki Velca	
July 22, 2022	Sani Sakakini	Contract expired	(Taiwan) Taoyuan Pilots	
August 15, 2022	Li Ping-Hung	Contract terminated	(Taiwan) NTNU basketball team head coach	
August 31, 2022	Chiu Po-Chang	Contract terminated	(Taiwan) Kaohsiung Steelers	
September 18, 2022	Chou Tzu-Hua	Contract expired	(Taiwan) Kaohsiung Formosa Plastics	
September 18, 2022	Anthony Tucker	Contract expired	(United States) Windy City Bulls	
October 3, 2022	Alonzo Gee	Contract expired	—N/a	
October 3, 2022	Niño Canaleta	Contract expired	(Philippines) Boracay Islanders	
November 11, 2022	Mike Edwards	Contract terminated	(Canada) London Lightning	
November 30, 2022	Sun Szu-Yao	Contract terminated	(Taiwan) Kaohsiung 17LIVE Steelers	
December 23, 2022	Diamond Stone	Contract terminated	(Mongolia) Zavkhan Brothers	
January 13, 2023	Tony Bishop	Contract terminated	(Nicaragua) Real Estelí	
January 24, 2023	Chen Ching-Huan	Contract terminated	(Taiwan) Tainan TSG GhostHawks	
February 27, 2023	Jordan Tolbert	Contract terminated	(Philippines) Rain or Shine Elasto Painters	
March 9, 2023	Marlon Johnson	Contract terminated	Dynamo Lebanon	
March 9, 2023	Raphiael Putney	Contract terminated	(Uruguay) Club Atlético Aguada	

== Awards ==
=== All-Star Game awards ===
Recipient	Award	Ref.
Lu Kuan-Hsuan	Three-Point Contest Champion	

=== Import of the Month ===
Month	Recipient	Award	Ref.
November	Tony Bishop	November Import of the Month	
