= Veljković =

Veljković (Serbian Cyrillic: Вељковић, pronounced [ʋěːʎkoʋitɕ]) is a Serbian surname derived from a masculine given name Veljko. Notable people with the surname include:

- Nataša Veljković (born 1968), Serbian pianist
- Stefana Veljković (born 1990), Serbian volleyball player
- Milenko Veljković (born 1995), Serbian basketball player
- Miloš Veljković (born 1995), Serbian football player
