= List of T1 League mascots =

The following was a list of mascots of the teams in T1 League. Tainan TSG GhostHawks and TaiwanBeer HeroBears was the teams without mascot. Taipei Mars was the only team with more than one mascot.

== Former mascots ==
Team	Mascot(s)	Tenures	Photo	Ref.
Kaohsiung Aquas	Brownie	2021–2024		
New Taipei CTBC DEA	Thunder	2022–2024		
Taichung Suns	Fire Boy	2022–2023		
Tainan TSG GhostHawks	None			
Taipei Mars	Richart	2023–2024		
Taipei Mars	Tyson	2023–2024		
Taiwan Beer Leopards	Bao Ge	2021–2024		
Taiwan Beer Leopards	Taiwan Beer Leopard	2023–2024		
TaiwanBeer HeroBears	None			
