= List of Taichung Suns head coaches =

The Taichung Suns were a Taiwanese professional basketball team based in Taichung City, Taiwan. The team was formerly known as the Taichung Wagor Suns from 2021 to 2022. The team was with Wang Wei-Chieh as the general manager. The Suns were founded in 2021 and won 0 T1 League championship. On October 16, 2023, the Suns announced to fold officially.

There had been 4 head coaches for the Taichung Suns franchise and hadn't won any T1 League championship.

== Key ==
GC	Games coached
W	Wins
L	Losses
Win%	Winning percentage
#	Number of coaches

== Coaches ==
Note: Statistics are correct through the end of the 2022–23 T1 League season.

#	Name	Term	GC	W	L	Win%	GC	W	L	Win%	Achievements
#	Name	Term	Regular season				Playoffs				Achievements
Taichung Wagor Suns
1	Iurgi Caminos	2021–2022	30	20	10	.667	6	2	4	.333	
Taichung Suns
2	Alberto Garcia	2022	Only coach for preseason games								
3	Chris Gavina	2022–2023	30	8	22	.267	5	2	3	.400	
4	Anthony Tucker	2023	Only coach before preseason games								
