= T1 League Cheerleading =

The T1 League was a professional basketball league in Taiwan. All teams had a squad of dancers for cheerleading.

== Former squads ==
Name	Team	Seasons	Ref.
Aqua Mermaids	Kaohsiung Aquas	2021–2024	
Cutiebears	TaiwanBeer HeroBears	2021–2023	
Leopard Girls	Taiwan Beer Leopards	2021–2024	
Passion Sisters	New Taipei CTBC DEA	2021–2024	
Shiny Girls	Taichung Suns	2021–2023	
Taishin Wonders	Taipei Mars	2023–2024	
Wing Stars	Tainan TSG GhostHawks	2023–2024	
Wings Girls	Tainan TSG GhostHawks	2021–2024	

== Best Cheerleaders of the Year ==
Since 2024, the league set the Best Cheerleaders of the Year.

Year	Squad	Team	Ref.
2024	Taishin Wonders	Taipei Mars	
