= Veljko =

Veljko (Cyrillic script: Вељко) is a masculine given name of Slavic origin. It may refer to:

- Hajduk Veljko Petrović (1780–1813), Vojvoda of the First Serbian Uprising rebellion against the Ottoman Empire
- Veljko Čubrilović (1886–1915), involved in the assassination of Archduke Franz Ferdinand of Austria
- Veljko Bakašun (1920–2007), Croat water polo player
- Veljko Bulajić (born 1928), Yugoslavian film director and actor from Montenegro
- Veljko Despot, born March 4, 1948, in Belgrade
- Veljko Kadijević (1925–2014), former General of the Army in the Yugoslav People's Army
- Veljko Milatović (1921–2004), Montenegrin Communist partisan, politician, statesman
- Veljko Nikitović (born 1980), Serbian footballer who currently plays for Górnik Łęczna
- Veljko Paunović (born 1977), former Serbian footballer
- Veljko Petković (born 1977), Serbian volleyball player
- Veljko Petrović (poet) (1884–1967), leading Post-Modernist Serbian poet
- Veljko Stanojević (1892–1967), Serbian painter
- Veljko Uskoković (born 1971), Montenegrin water polo player
- Veljko Vlahović (1914–1975), Montenegrin member of the Yugoslav Communist Party from 1935

== See also ==
- Veljković
- Veljkovo
