= Nataša Veljković =

Serbian pianist

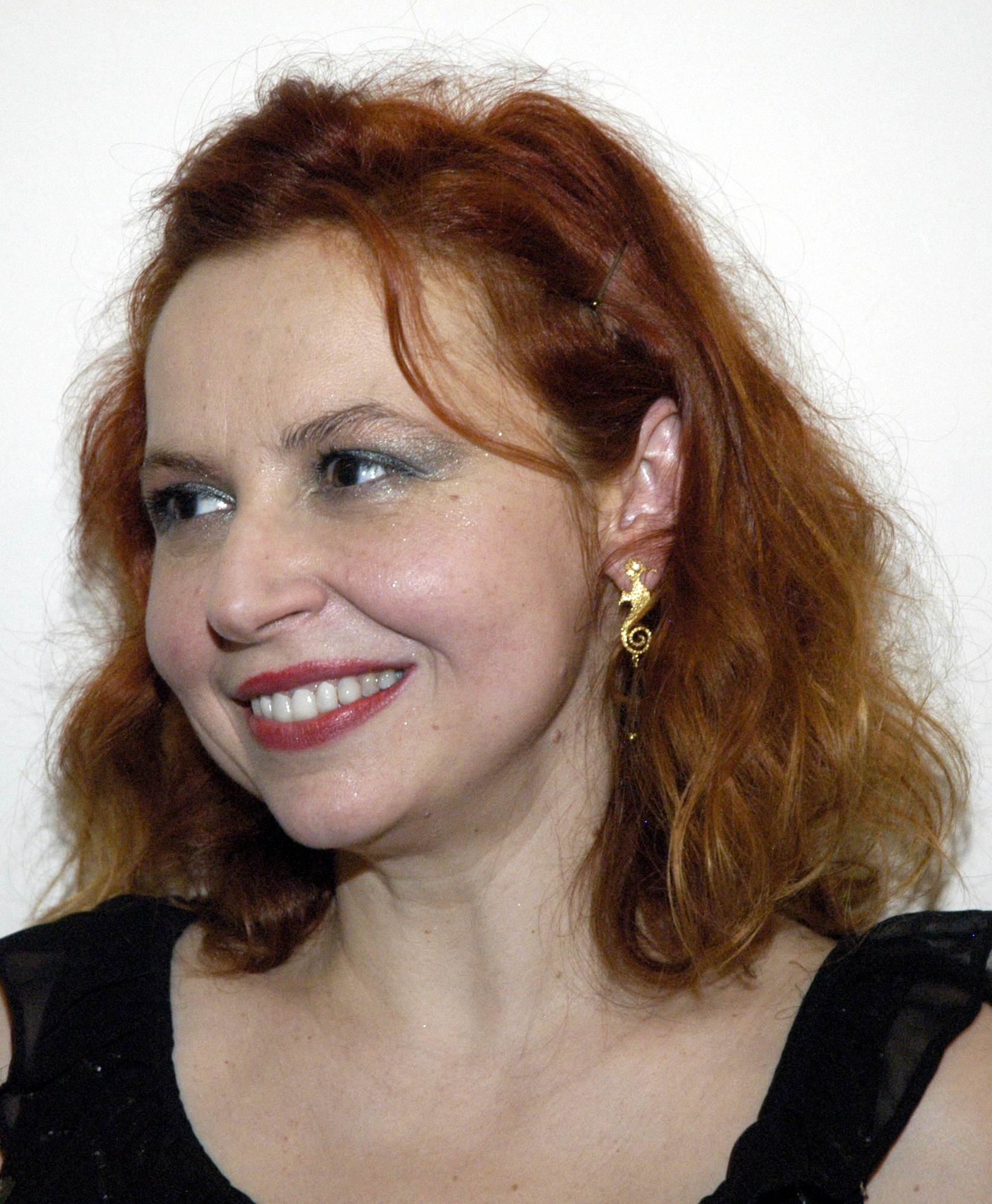
Nataša Veljković (2015)

Nataša Veljković (born in Belgrade, 2.4.1968) is a Serbian pianist.

She was trained under Arbo Valdma, Paul Badura-Skoda (University of Music in Vienna, -1987), Rudolf Firkusny (Juilliard School, 1988–89) and Harry Datyner (Geneva Conservatory, 1990–92). She then settled in Vienna, where she is teaching at the University of Music since 1993.

At 17 Veljković won the XI Concours Clara Haskil, which was followed by the World Music Masters competition in Montecarlo five years later. At her return from Vevey she made her LP debut for Jugoton and up to now, 10 more CDs for PGP-RTS, Zulus Records Vienna and GRAMOLA. She has performed through Europe and Asia since, as she is member of the jury at major international piano competitions, i.e., Concours Clara Haskil.

Nataša Veljković is mother of young violinist Milica Zulus (born in Vienna, 31.8.1999).
