= Arnett Moultrie =

American basketball player (born 1990)

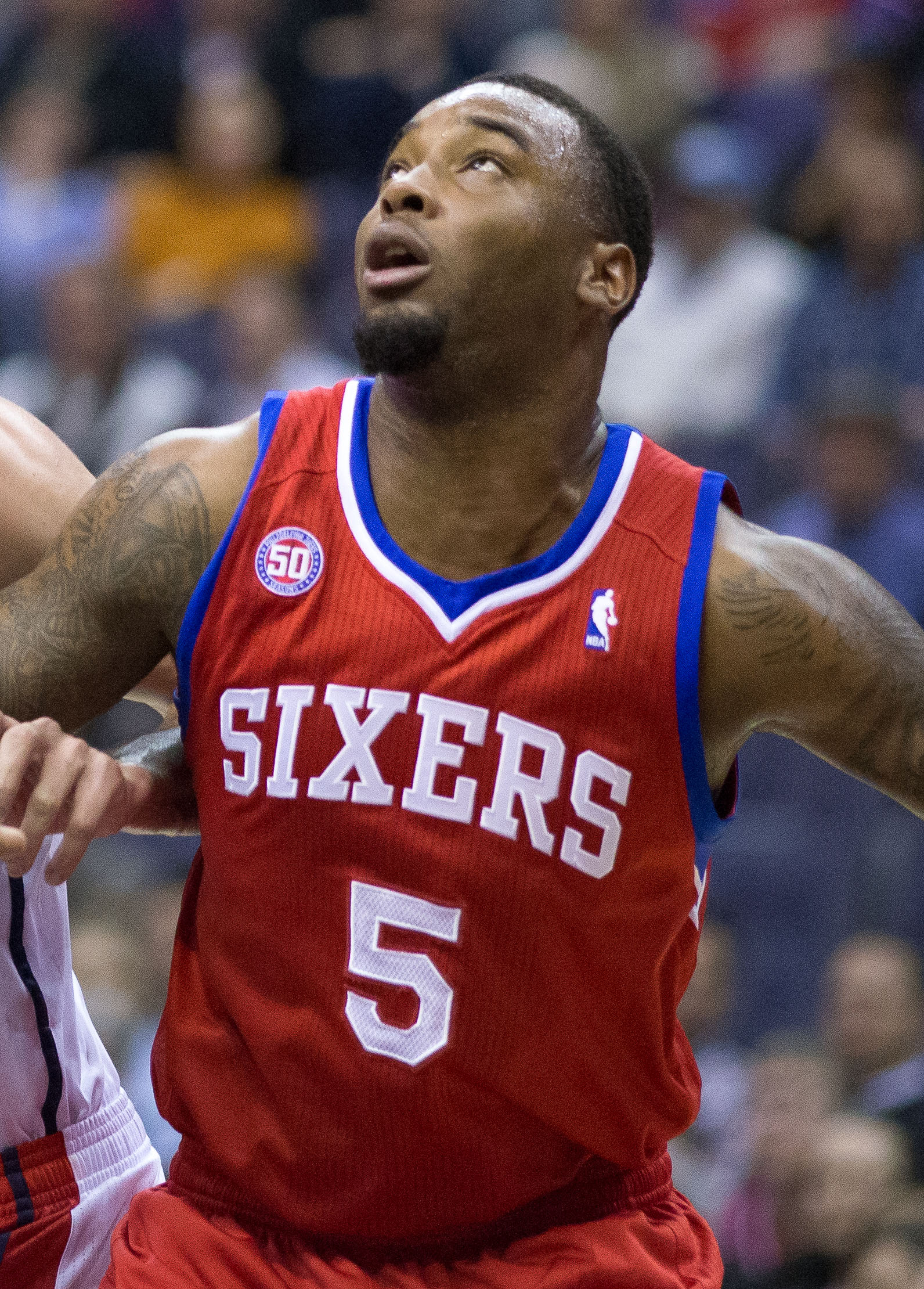
- Moultrie with the Philadelphia 76ers in 2013

No. 11 – Pioneros de Los Mochis
- Position: Power forward / center
- League: CIBACOPA

Personal information
- Born: November 18, 1990 (age 35) Queens, New York, U.S.
- Listed height: 6 ft 10 in (2.08 m)
- Listed weight: 250 lb (113 kg)

Career information
- High school: Raleigh Egypt (Memphis, Tennessee)
- College: UTEP (2008–2010); Mississippi State (2011–2012)
- NBA draft: 2012: 1st round, 27th overall pick
- Drafted by: Miami Heat
- Playing career: 2012–present

Career history
- 2012–2014: Philadelphia 76ers
- 2012–2013: →Sioux Falls Skyforce
- 2014: →Delaware 87ers
- 2014–2015: Jiangsu Dragons
- 2016: Atenienses de Manatí
- 2016–2017: Ankara DSİ
- 2017: Defensor Sporting
- 2017: Incheon Electroland Elephants
- 2017–2018: Mahram Tehran
- 2018: Al Muharraq
- 2018: NLEX Road Warriors
- 2018: Hebei Xianglan
- 2018–2019: BC Kalev
- 2019: Parma
- 2020: Beijing Royal Fighters
- 2020–2021: Nanjing Monkey Kings
- 2021–2022: Xinjiang Flying Tigers
- 2023: Taichung Suns
- 2023: Qingdao Eagles
- 2024: Maccabi Rishon LeZion
- 2024–2025: Taipei Fubon Braves
- 2025: Kaohsiung Aquas
- 2026–present: Pioneros de Los Mochis

Career highlights
- Russian Cup champion (2019); All-VTB United League Second Team (2019); Estonian Basketball League champion (2019); Lebanese League champion (2016); First-team All-SEC (2012)
- Stats at NBA.com
- Stats at Basketball Reference
Medals
Men's basketball
Representing the United States
U-19 World Championship
Gold medal – first place	2009 New Zealand	Team

Arnett Nathaniel Moultrie (born November 18, 1990) is an American professional basketball player for the Pioneros de Los Mochis of the CIBACOPA. He played college basketball with the UTEP Miners and Mississippi State Bulldogs.

== High school ==
In Moultrie's junior season at Raleigh-Egypt High School, he averaged 15 points, 8 rebounds and 2 blocks per game. In his senior season, he averaged 15 points, 8 rebounds and 4 blocks per game.

== College career ==
=== Freshman season ===
In Moultrie's freshman season at UTEP, he averaged 8.8 points and 8.2 rebounds per game. He was also named to the Conference USA All-Freshman Team. Moultrie averaged 13.2 points and 8.7 rebounds per game in the College Basketball Invitational as UTEP lost in the final round to Oregon State.

=== Sophomore season ===
In his sophomore season at UTEP, Moultrie averaged 9.8 points and 6.7 rebounds per game. In the Conference-USA Tournament, Moultrie averaged 12.0 points per game and earned a spot on the all-tournament team.

=== Junior season ===
Moultrie was forced to sit out a season after transferring to Mississippi State. In his first and only season playing for Mississippi State, (2011–12), Moultrie averaged 16.4 points and 10.5 rebounds per game. He was also named to the All-SEC men's basketball team. On March 28, 2012, Moultrie decided to enter his name in the 2012 NBA draft.

== Professional career ==
Moultrie was drafted with the 27th pick in the 2012 NBA draft by the Miami Heat. He was then traded to the Philadelphia 76ers for Justin Hamilton and a future first-round draft pick. On December 21, 2012, Moultrie was assigned to the Sioux Falls Skyforce of the NBA D-League. He was recalled on January 6, 2013.

On February 4, 2014, he was assigned to the Delaware 87ers. On February 9, 2014, he was recalled by the 76ers. On February 21, 2014, Moultrie had his first career start. In 31 minutes, he recorded 6 points, 5 rebounds and 2 steals in a 112–124 loss to the Dallas Mavericks. On March 15, 2014, he was reassigned to the 87ers. On March 31, 2014, he was suspended for five games for violating the NBA's anti-drug policy. On April 6, 2014, he was again recalled to the 76ers.

On October 27, 2014, he was traded to the New York Knicks in exchange for Travis Outlaw, a 2019 second-round draft selection and the option exchange 2018 second-round draft selections. Upon acquisition, he was waived by the Knicks.

On December 16, 2014, he signed with the Jiangsu Dragons of the Chinese Basketball Association.

On December 5, 2015, Moultrie signed with Al-Riyadi Beirut of Lebanon.

In March 2018, Moultrie signed with the NLEX Road Warriors of the Philippine Basketball Association as their import for the 2018 PBA Commissioner's Cup.

In November 2018, Moultrie signed with Kalev/Cramo of the Latvian–Estonian Basketball League (LEBL) and the VTB United League. His first game for the team was in the VTB United League as he scored 16 points and grabbed 9 rebounds in 26 minutes against Parma as Kalev/Cramo won 93–82.

In December 2019, Arnett moved to the Beijing Royal Fighters of the Chinese Basketball Association. He debuted on January 5, 2020, as club won 112–96 against Shanghai Sharks. Moultrie averaged 18.8 points and 11.3 rebounds per game. On October 29, 2020, he signed with the Nanjing Monkey Kings. On March 28, 2021, Moultrie scored 37 points and grabbed a career-high 34 rebounds in a 105–95 victory over the Jiangsu Dragons. His 34 rebounds were five rebounds short of breaking the CBA record for most rebounds in a single game.

On March 8, 2023, Taichung Suns registered Arnett as import player. On March 9, Arnett signed with the Taichung Suns of the T1 League.

On August 12, 2024, Arnett signed with the Maccabi Rishon LeZion of the Liga Leumit. On November 22, he signed with the Taipei Fubon Braves of the P. League+. On February 2, 2025, he parted ways with the Taipei Fubon Braves.

On February 7, 2025, Moultrie signed with the Kaohsiung Aquas of the Taiwan Professional Basketball League (TPBL). On April 3, Moultrie was not registered in the 2024–25 TPBL season final rosters. And Kaohsiung Aquas terminated the contract relationship with Moultrie.

== Career statistics ==
Legend
GP	Games played	GS	Games started	MPG	Minutes per game
FG%	Field goal percentage	3P%	3-point field goal percentage	FT%	Free throw percentage
RPG	Rebounds per game	APG	Assists per game	SPG	Steals per game
BPG	Blocks per game	PPG	Points per game	**Bold**	Career high

=== NBA ===
Year	Team	GP	GS	MPG	FG%	3P%	FT%	RPG	APG	SPG	BPG	PPG
2012–13	Philadelphia	**47**	0	11.5	**.582**	.000	.643	**3.1**	**0.2**	0.4	0.2	**3.7**
2013–14	Philadelphia	12	**2**	**15.6**	.421	.000	**.800**	2.9	**0.2**	**0.7**	**0.3**	3.0
**Career**		59	2	12.4	.547	.000	.667	3.1	0.2	0.4	0.2	3.6

=== College ===
Year	Team	GP	GS	MPG	FG%	3P%	FT%	RPG	APG	SPG	BPG	PPG
2008–09	UTEP	**37**	**34**	26.8	.502	.282	.535	8.2	0.6	0.8	0.9	8.8
2009–10	UTEP	33	33	28.9	.475	.225	.651	8.2	**1.2**	**1.4**	**0.8**	9.8
2011–12	Mississippi State	30	30	**35.8**	**.549**	**.444**	**.780**	**10.5**	**1.2**	0.8	**0.8**	**16.4**

=== CBA ===
Year	Team	GP	GS	MPG	FG%	3P%	FT%	RPG	APG	SPG	BPG	PPG
2020-21	Nanjing	**48**	**45**	36.7	.576	**.300**	.818	13.0	2.7	1.5	1.2	26.3
2021-22	Xinjiang	25	25	**41.3**	**.648**	.000	**.865**	**14.8**	**3.0**	**2.1**	**1.4**	**29.6**

Source: basketball-stats.de (Date: 26. March 2022)

== International career ==
Moultrie represented the U-19 United States national team at the 2009 U-19 World Championship held in New Zealand, where they won the gold medal.
