= Aaron Geramipoor =

British-Iranian basketball player

Aaron Geramipoor آرون گرامی‌پور
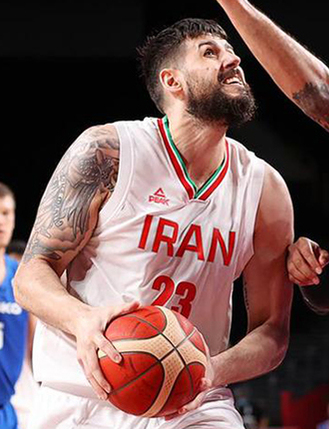
- Geramipoor with Iran in 2020

No. 32 – TSG GhostHawks
- Position: Center
- League: P. League+

Personal information
- Born: 11 September 1992 (age 34) Stockport, Greater Manchester, England
- Listed height: 7 ft 0 in (2.13 m)
- Listed weight: 123 kg (271 lb)

Career information
- College: Seton Hall (2010–2014)
- NBA draft: 2014: undrafted
- Playing career: 2014–present

Career history
- 2014–2015: Gran Canaria
- 2015: Ourense
- 2015–2016: Soles de Mexicali
- 2016–2017: Cafés Candelas Breogán
- 2017–2018: Azad University
- 2017–2018: Cibona
- 2020: San Lorenzo de Almagro
- 2021: Manchester Giants
- 2021: C.D. Universidad de Concepción
- 2022–2023: Taichung Suns
- 2023–2024: Kaohsiung Aquas
- 2024–2025: Soles de Mexicali
- 2025: Taipei Fubon Braves
- 2026: Johor Southern Tigers
- 2026–present: TSG GhostHawks

Career highlights
- T1 League All-Star (2023)

Aaron Geramipoor (Persian: آرون گرامی‌پور; born 11 September 1992) is a British-Iranian professional basketball player for the TSG GhostHawks of the Taiwanese P. League+. He retired from the Iran national team after the Tokyo 2020 Olympics. He was born and raised in Stockport, Greater Manchester.

Official 2019 FIBA Basketball World Cup, stated that “ The 7-footer added another big body to relieve pressure off Hamed Haddadi and even put up productive and efficient numbers of his own. In 16.7 minutes per game, Geramipoor averaged 10.4 points and 6.0 rebounds on 69.7 percent shooting.

Soon after the 2019 FIBA World Cup, Geramipoor joined Jeoutai Technology in the SBL. Geramipoor was released before season started.

In January 2020, it was announced that Geramipoor had signed for the Argentine side San Lorenzo de Almagro.

A few weeks later, the team travelled to Tenerife for the Intercontinental Cup 2020, where the team also banked 3rd place.

On 18 March 2022, Geramipoor signed with the Taichung Suns of the T1 League. On 9 September, he re-signed with the Taichung Suns. On 8 March 2023, Taichung Suns cancelled the registration of Geramipoor's playership due to an injury he sustained.

On 10 August 2023, Geramipoor signed with the Kaohsiung Aquas of the T1 League. On 17 July 2024, Kaohsiung Aquas announced that Geramipoor left the team.
