= Harry Datyner =

Swiss musician (1923–1992)

- Born: 4 February 1923; La Chaux-de-Fonds, Switzerland
- Died: 23 March 1992 (aged 69); Fribourg, Switzerland
- Occupations: Pianist, music educator

Harry Datyner (La Chaux-de-Fonds, 4 February 1923 – Fribourg, 23 March 1992) was a Swiss classical pianist who taught for many years at the Geneva Conservatory.

Datyner was a student of both Marguerite Long and Edwin Fischer; he also studied with Émile-Robert Blanchet. He won the First Prize by unanimity at the Geneva International Music Competition in 1944, at the age of 21, after which he performed extensively under conductors such as Ernest Ansermet, Georges Prêtre, Charles Dutoit, Wolfgang Sawallisch, Eleazar de Carvalho, Pierre Dervaux, Charles Groves, Lovro von Matačić, and with orchestras such as the Orchestre de la Suisse Romande, London Philharmonic Orchestra, Montreal Symphony Orchestra, Monte-Carlo Philharmonic Orchestra and National Orchestra of Belgium. Among his students at the Geneva Conervatory was Polish pianist and composer Tadeusz Kassatti.

He played in Liverpool in 1954, 1956 and 1957. He gave his North American debut and judged the Montreal International Piano Competition in 1965.

Datyner was married and had a son. In 1992, at the age of 69, Datyner died in a car accident in Fribourg.
