= Milenko Veljković =

Serbian basketball player

Personal information
- Born: 20 September 1995 (age 31) Kruševac, Serbia, FR Yugoslavia
- Listed height: 2.18 m (7 ft 2 in)
- Listed weight: 98 kg (216 lb)

Career information
- NBA draft: 2017: undrafted
- Playing career: 2010–present
- Position: Center

Career history
- 2010–2012: OKK Kruševac
- 2012–2017: Mega Basket
- 2013–2014: → Smederevo 1953
- 2014: → Srem
- 2016–2017: → Mladost Zemun
- 2017–2018: Vršac
- 2018–2019: OKK Beograd
- 2019: Palencia Baloncesto
- 2019–2020: Chernomorets Burgas
- 2020–2021: Napredak JKP
- 2021: OKK Beograd
- 2021–2022: Metalac
- 2022: Zrinjski Mostar
- 2022: TaiwanBeer HeroBears
- 2023–2024: BK Geosan Kolín

Milenko Veljković (Serbian Cyrillic: Миленко Вељковић, born 20 September 1995) is a Serbian professional basketball player.

== Professional career ==
=== Taiwan ===
On 12 September 2022, Veljković signed with the TaiwanBeer HeroBears of the T1 League. On 13 December, Veljković was released by the TaiwanBeer HeroBears.
