= Cleanthony Early =

American basketball player (born 1991)

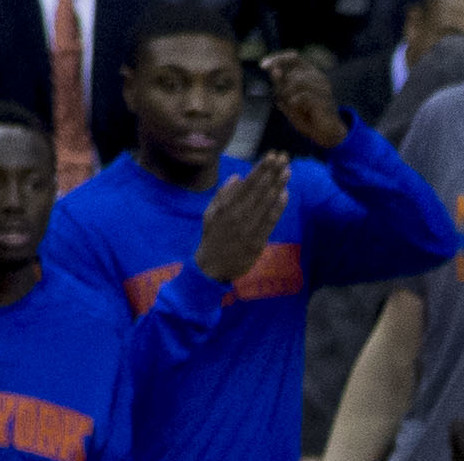
- Early with the New York Knicks in 2014

No. 11 – Indian Railways
- Position: Power forward
- League: INBL; WASL

Personal information
- Born: April 17, 1991 (age 35) The Bronx, New York, U.S.
- Listed height: 6 ft 8 in (2.03 m)
- Listed weight: 220 lb (100 kg)

Career information
- High school: Pine Bush (Pine Bush, New York); Mount Zion Christian Academy (Durham, North Carolina)
- College: SUNY Sullivan (2010–2012); Wichita State (2012–2014)
- NBA draft: 2014: 2nd round, 34th overall pick
- Drafted by: New York Knicks
- Playing career: 2014–present

Career history
- 2014–2016: New York Knicks
- 2015–2016: →Westchester Knicks
- 2016: Westchester Knicks
- 2016–2017: Santa Cruz Warriors
- 2017–2018: Rio Grande Valley Vipers
- 2018: Enriquillo
- 2018–2019: Tokyo Hachioji Bee Trains
- 2019: Atomerőmű SE
- 2019–2020: Al Ahli Jeddah
- 2020–2021: Antibes Sharks
- 2021: Al Ahli Jeddah
- 2021: Ohud Medina
- 2021: Al-Nasr
- 2021–2022: New Taipei CTBC DEA
- 2022: Cape Town Tigers
- 2022: Gladiadores de Anzoátegui
- 2022: TaiwanBeer HeroBears
- 2023: Dynamo Lebanon
- 2023: BCH Garid
- 2023: Al-Ittihad Manama
- 2024: Sagesse Club
- 2024–2025: Al-Arabi
- 2025–2026: Zamalek
- 2026–present: Indian Railways

Career highlights
- Consensus second-team All-American (2014); 2× First-team All-MVC (2013, 2014); MVC Newcomer of the Year (2013); 2× NJCAA Division III Player of the Year (2011, 2012); 2× NJCAA All-American (2011, 2012)
- Stats at NBA.com
- Stats at Basketball Reference

Cleanthony Early (born April 17, 1991) is an American professional basketball player for Indian Railways of the Indian National Basketball League (INBL) and the FIBA West Asia Super League (WASL). He was an All-American college player at Wichita State University after a stint at Sullivan County Community College, and was drafted in the second round of the 2014 NBA draft by the New York Knicks.

== Early life ==
Early was born in the Bronx. After Early's cousin was murdered, his mother decided to leave the city and relocate to suburban Middletown, New York when he was 14. Early attended Pine Bush High School in Pine Bush, New York before transferring to Mount Zion Christian Academy in Durham, North Carolina. Tragedy affected Early once again after his brother drowned in Schoharie Creek at age 32. This led to Early wanting to be closer to his family and attending Sullivan County Community College.

As a high school junior, Early told the Times Herald-Record that he was only 6 ft 5 in (1.96 m) tall despite being listed at 6 ft 6 in (1.98 m). Considered a two-star recruit by ESPN.com, Early was listed as the No. 102 small forward in the nation in 2010.

== College career ==
Early was a junior college star at Sullivan County Community College, where he was the two-time Division III NJCAA Player of the Year. After considering offers from major conference schools, he signed with Wichita State and coach Gregg Marshall.

Early made an immediate impact for the Shockers, averaging 13.9 points and 5.4 rebounds per game. He was named first team All-Missouri Valley Conference and the MVC Newcomer of the Year. In the post-season, Early led the team to the 2013 Final Four in Atlanta. In the Shockers' semifinal game against eventual champion Louisville, Early scored 24 points and collected 10 rebounds in a narrow 72–68 loss. He was named to the All-Final Four team for his efforts.

Going into his senior season, Early gained widespread national attention. He was named preseason Player of the Year for the Missouri Valley Conference and was named to the preseason top 50 watch lists for the John Wooden and Naismith Awards for national player of the year.

Early helped lead the 2013–14 team to an undefeated 34–0 record entering the NCAA tournament, becoming the first team in Division I men's basketball to do so in over two decades. Early put up an impressive effort in an attempt to help the Shockers advance to the Sweet Sixteen, with 31 points and 7 rebounds on 12-of-17 shooting. The Shockers ended up losing to Kentucky 78–76, ending their hopes of a Final Four repeat.

== Professional career ==
=== New York Knicks (2014–16) ===
On June 26, 2014, Early was selected with the 34th overall pick in the 2014 NBA draft by the New York Knicks. On August 1, he signed with the Knicks. During his rookie season, Early had multiple assignments with the Westchester Knicks of the NBA Development League. In three games for Westchester during the 2014–15 season, he averaged 20.3 points and 9.7 rebounds per game. On March 25, 2015, Early had a season-best game for New York with 18 points and 4 rebounds in a loss to the Los Angeles Clippers.

During the 2015–16 season, Early received multiple assignments to Westchester. On December 2, 2015, he became the fifth player ever to appear in both a Development League game and NBA game in the same day. On March 20, 2016, Early made his first appearance for New York since December 29, having been out for nearly three months with a knee injury he suffered after being shot on December 30.

Early re-signed with the New York Knicks on October 18, 2016, but was waived three days later. On October 31, Early was acquired by the Westchester Knicks of the NBA Development League as an affiliate player of the New York Knicks.

=== Santa Cruz Warriors (2016–17) ===
On December 21, 2016, Early was acquired by the Santa Cruz Warriors in a three-team trade involving Westchester and the Texas Legends. In 16 games for Santa Cruz, he averaged 9.2 points and 3.9 rebounds per game. Early appeared in 19 games for Santa Cruz in the 2017–18 season.

=== 2017–2020 ===
On September 2, 2017, Early signed a contract with AEK Athens of the Greek Basket League. However, his contract was terminated a few days later for disciplinary reasons.

On December 21, 2017, Early was traded by the Warriors with the rights to Elgin Cook to the Rio Grande Valley Vipers for Winston Shepard and the rights to Markus Kennedy. In October 2018, he joined Dominican club Parque Hostos and Enriquillo. He later signed for Japanese club Tokyo Hachioji Bee Trains for the 2018–19 season.

On August 23, 2019, he has signed with Atomerőmű SE of the Hungarian Nemzeti Bajnokság I/A.

On October 11, 2019, Early signed with Al Ahli of the Saudi Basketball league.

=== 2020–2023 ===
On August 6, 2020, he signed a five-year deal with Antibes Sharks of the LNB Pro B. Early was named LNB Pro B player of the week on October 19, after his 41-point, 8-rebound performance against Rouen Métropole Basket.

In March 2021, he was part of an exchange transfer in Saudi Arabia, where he joined Ohud Medina from Al-Nasr.

On November 9, 2021, he signed with New Taipei CTBC DEA of the T1 League.

On May 4, 2022, Early was announced as a new signing by the Cape Town Tigers of the Basketball Africa League (BAL), joining the team ahead of the 2022 BAL Playoffs. On May 23, Early made his debut and scored 15 points in the quarterfinal against Monastir, in which the Tigers were eliminated. In August 2022, he joined Kuwaiti side Kazma.

On November 25, 2022, Early signed with TaiwanBeer HeroBears of the T1 League. On January 5, 2023, the team terminated the contract relationship with Early.-

=== 2023–present ===
On January 21, 2023, Early joined Lebanese side Dynamo Lebanon. In March 2023, he played for Mongolian BCH Garid, and Bahraini Al-Ittihad Manama. In March 2024, he signed for Lebanese club Sagesse.

On January 8, 2025, Early signed with the Central Club of the Lebanese Basketball League. On March 12, he signed with the Zavkhan Brothers of The League. On March 21, he signed with the Al Arabi SC of the Qatari Basketball League.

== NBA career statistics ==
Legend
| GP | Games played | GS | Games started | MPG | Minutes per game |
| FG% | Field goal percentage | 3P% | 3-point field goal percentage | FT% | Free throw percentage |
| RPG | Rebounds per game | APG | Assists per game | SPG | Steals per game |
| BPG | Blocks per game | PPG | Points per game | **Bold** | Career high |

=== Regular season ===
| Year | Team | GP | GS | MPG | FG% | 3P% | FT% | RPG | APG | SPG | BPG | PPG |
|---|---|---|---|---|---|---|---|---|---|---|---|---|
| 2014–15 | New York | **39** | **7** | **16.6** | **.355** | .262 | **.750** | **2.5** | **.9** | **.6** | **.3** | **5.4** |
| 2015–16 | New York | 17 | 2 | 9.1 | .300 | **.267** | **.750** | 1.5 | .4 | .1 | .2 | 1.8 |
| Career | | 56 | 9 | 14.3 | .346 | .263 | .750 | 2.2 | .8 | .5 | .3 | 4.3 |

== Personal life ==
In the early hours of December 30, 2015, Early was held up at gunpoint and shot in the right knee while traveling in an Uber. The attack took place after Early and his girlfriend left a strip club in Maspeth, Queens. He was taken to Elmhurst Hospital after the shooting where he was listed in stable condition.
