= Perry Jones =

American basketball player (born 1991)

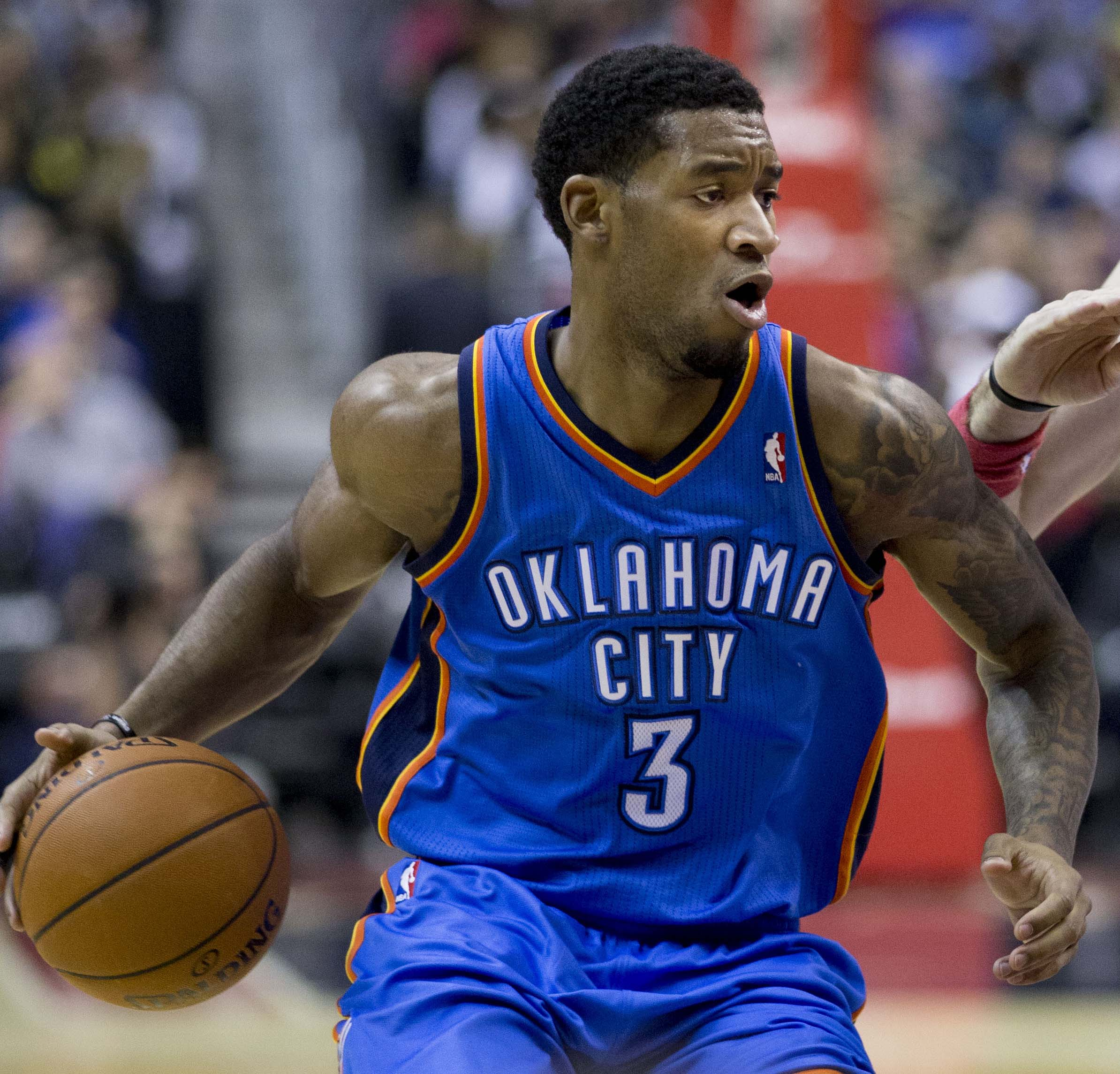
- Jones with the Oklahoma City Thunder in 2014

No. 2 – Johor Southern Tigers
- Position: Small forward / power forward
- League: Major Basketball League Malaysia

Personal information
- Born: September 24, 1991 (age 35) Winnsboro, Louisiana, U.S.
- Listed height: 6 ft 11 in (2.11 m)
- Listed weight: 235 lb (107 kg)

Career information
- High school: Duncanville (Duncanville, Texas)
- College: Baylor (2010–2012)
- NBA draft: 2012: 1st round, 28th overall pick
- Drafted by: Oklahoma City Thunder
- Playing career: 2012–present

Career history
- 2012–2015: Oklahoma City Thunder
- 2012–2013: →Tulsa 66ers
- 2015–2016: Iowa Energy
- 2016: Khimki
- 2016–2018: Iowa Energy / Wolves
- 2019–2021: Bursaspor
- 2021: s.Oliver Würzburg
- 2022: Windy City Bulls
- 2022–2023: Taipei Fubon Braves
- 2023: TaiwanBeer HeroBears
- 2023: Capitanes de Arecibo
- 2023–2024: Kaohsiung Aquas
- 2024: Spartans Distrito Capital
- 2024–2025: Al-Ahli Jeddah
- 2026–: Zonkeys de Tijuana
- 2026-present: Johor Southern Tigers

Career highlights
- P.League+ Champion (2022); Third-team All-Big 12 (2012); Second-team All-Big 12 (2011); Big 12 All-Rookie Team (2011); Third-team Parade All-American (2010); McDonald's All-American (2010)
- Stats at NBA.com
- Stats at Basketball Reference

Perry James Jones III (born September 24, 1991) is an American professional basketball player for the Johor Southern Tigers of the Major Basketball League Malaysia. He played college basketball for Baylor.

== High school career ==
Jones was the #7 player in the ESPNU 100, the #9 player in the class of 2010 by Scout.com, and also rated as the #9 player by Rivals.com. In his junior year, Jones, along with future Texas forward Shawn Williams, led Duncanville to the Texas 5A regional championship game where they lost to Cedar Hill High School 60–59. Duncanville finished with a 23–9 record for the season.

In recognition of his outstanding career, Jones was named to the 2010 McDonald's All-American team.

=== AAU ===
Jones' AAU team was the LBA Seawolves. In July 2009, he helped lead them to the semifinals in the Star Vision Sports Center Stage tournament in Las Vegas.

=== College recruitment ===
College recruiting
Name	Hometown	School	Height	Weight	Commit date
Perry Jones; F	Duncanville, Texas	Duncanville HS	6 ft 11 in (2.11 m)	220 lb (100 kg)	Apr 17, 2007
Perry Jones; F	Recruit ratings: Scout: Rivals: (97)				

Jones committed to Baylor on April 17, 2007, and started playing for them in the 2010–11 NCAA season. He was ranked as the #7 overall player on ESPN, #9 by Rivals, and #14 ranked by Scout.com.

== College career ==
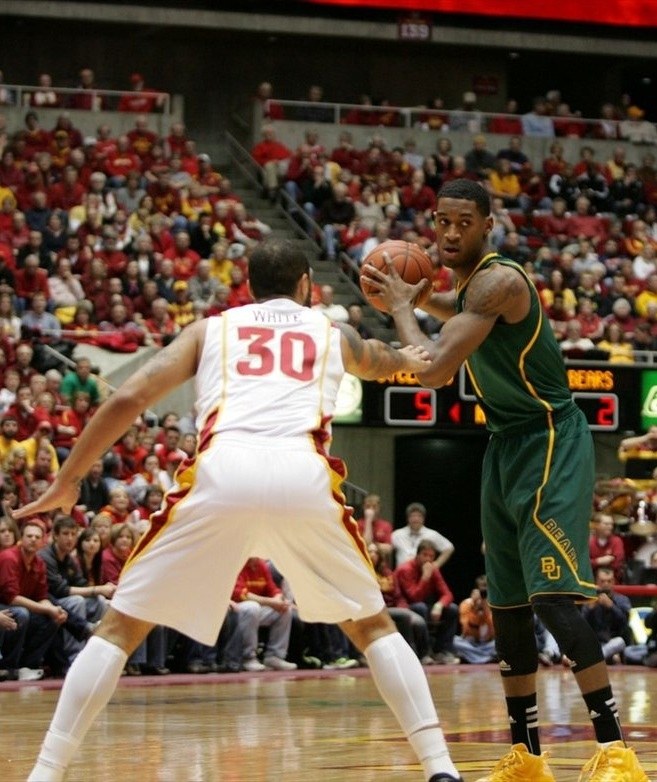
Jones being defended by Royce White

Jones had 11 points and eight rebounds in his Baylor debut. He averaged 13.9 points, 7.2 rebounds, and 1.2 assists per game during his freshman season at Baylor. Despite the hype around the Baylor basketball program coming into the season, the Bears finished with a record of 18–13 (7–9 Big 12) and failed to make the NCAA Tournament. However, Jones was still named to the All-Big 12 Second Team along with Kansas junior Markieff Morris, Texas freshman Tristan Thompson, Iowa State senior Diante Garrett, and Texas A&M sophomore Khris Middleton.

On March 10, 2011, NCAA investigators ruled Jones ineligible for receiving improper benefits from his AAU coach prior to enrolling at Baylor University (The benefits were reportedly three 15-day loans to Jones' parents totaling less than $1,000, all of which were paid back). Jones was forced to sit out of Baylor's game against Oklahoma in the Big 12 tournament, which the Bears lost by 17 eliminating their chances at an NCAA Tournament berth. Jones was eligible to return to Baylor next season on an athletic scholarship, but would have to sit out the first five games of the 2011–12 season before he could be reinstated by the NCAA and eligible to play.

On April 11, 2011, Perry Jones announced that he would be returning to Baylor for his sophomore season.

=== College statistics ===
Year	Team	GP	GS	MPG	FG%	3P%	FT%	RPG	APG	SPG	BPG	PPG
2010–11	Baylor Bears	30	30	33.9	.549	.200	.664	7.2	1.2	0.5	0.9	13.9
2011–12	Baylor Bears	33	33	30.7	.500	.303	.696	7.6	1.3	0.8	0.6	13.5

== Professional career ==
=== Oklahoma City Thunder (2012–2015) ===
Jones was a projected lottery pick in the 2012 NBA draft, but fell to 28th overall when he was selected by the Oklahoma City Thunder. As a rookie, Jones had multiple assignments with the Tulsa 66ers of the NBA Development League.

After receiving limited opportunities with the Thunder in 2012–13, Jones went on to play 62 games in 2013–14 with averages of 3.5 points and 1.8 rebounds per game. On November 24, 2013, he scored a season-high 13 points in the 95–73 victory over the Utah Jazz. Jones appeared in 11 playoff games during the 2014 NBA Playoffs, scoring a playoff-high of eight points in Game 1 of the Thunder's semi-final match-up against the Los Angeles Clippers.

On October 30, 2014, Jones scored a career-high 32 points on 10-of-17 shooting in a 93–90 loss to the Clippers.

=== Iowa Energy (2015–2016) ===
On July 14, 2015, Jones was traded, along with a 2019 second round pick and cash considerations, to the Boston Celtics in exchange for a conditional 2018 second-round pick that would be completely unprotected for 2019. The deal generated a traded player exception for the Thunder. On October 24, he was waived by the Celtics after appearing in five preseason games. Exactly a week later, Jones was selected by the Iowa Energy with the third overall pick in the 2015 NBA Development League draft. On March 23, 2016, he was waived by Iowa.

=== Khimki Moscow (2016) ===
On August 9, 2016, Jones signed with Khimki Moscow Region of Russia for the 2016–17 season. On October 11, he parted ways with Khimki after appearing in only one game.

=== Return to Iowa (2016) ===
On November 15, 2016, Jones was re-acquired by the Iowa Energy.

=== Bursaspor (2019–2021) ===
On August 28, 2019, Jones signed with Bursaspor of the Turkish Super League.

=== s.Oliver Würzburg (2021) ===
On January 29, 2021, s.Oliver Würzburg of the Basketball Bundesliga (BBL) announced the signing of Jones.

=== Windy City Bulls (2022) ===
On January 2, 2022, Jones cleared waivers and was acquired by the Windy City Bulls via the available player pool. He was then later waived on February 23.

=== Taipei Fubon Braves (2022–2023) ===
On April 3, 2022, Jones signed with the Taipei Fubon Braves of Taiwanese P. League+.

=== TaiwanBeer HeroBears (2023) ===
On January 6, 2023, Jones signed with the TaiwanBeer HeroBears of the T1 League.

=== Kaohsiung Aquas (2023–2024) ===
On August 11, 2023, Jones signed with the Kaohsiung Aquas of the T1 League.

=== Spartans Distrito Capital (2024) ===
On May 26, 2024, Jones signed with the Spartans Distrito Capital of the Superliga Profesional de Baloncesto (SPB).

=== Big3 (2019–present) ===
Jones has been a regular in the Big3 basketball league. In 2019, he was named co-captain of the Enemies, becoming the youngest captain in league history. Currently, Jones plays for 3's Company alongside Mario Chalmers and Michael Beasley.

== NBA career statistics ==
Legend
GP	Games played	GS	Games started	MPG	Minutes per game
FG%	Field goal percentage	3P%	3-point field goal percentage	FT%	Free throw percentage
RPG	Rebounds per game	APG	Assists per game	SPG	Steals per game
BPG	Blocks per game	PPG	Points per game	**Bold**	Career high

=== Regular season ===
Year	Team	GP	GS	MPG	FG%	3P%	FT%	RPG	APG	SPG	BPG	PPG
2012–13	Oklahoma City	38	1	7.4	.394	.000	**.667**	1.6	.3	.1	.2	2.3
2013–14	Oklahoma City	**62**	7	12.3	**.459**	**.361**	**.667**	**1.8**	**.4**	.2	**.3**	3.5
2014–15	Oklahoma City	43	**13**	**14.7**	.397	.233	.649	**1.8**	**.4**	**.4**	.2	**4.3**
**Career**		143	21	11.7	.420	.293	.660	1.8	.4	.3	.2	3.4

=== Playoffs ===
Year	Team	GP	GS	MPG	FG%	3P%	FT%	RPG	APG	SPG	BPG	PPG
2013	Oklahoma City	1	0	**5.0**	.000	.000	.000	**1.0**	.0	.0	.0	.0
2014	Oklahoma City	**11**	0	**5.0**	**.389**	**.300**	.000	.8	**.1**	.0	**.1**	**1.5**
Career		12	0	5.0	.368	.300	.000	.8	.1	.0	.1	1.4
