= Michael Qualls =

American basketball player (born 1994)

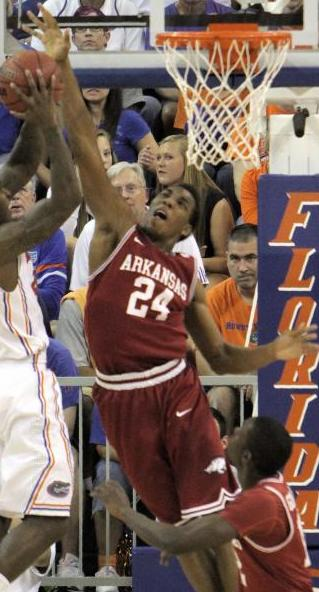
- Qualls with Arkansas in 2013

Free agent
- Position: Shooting guard

Personal information
- Born: January 20, 1994 (age 32) Shreveport, Louisiana, U.S.
- Listed height: 6 ft 4 in (1.93 m)
- Listed weight: 202 lb (92 kg)

Career information
- High school: Huntington (Shreveport, Louisiana)
- College: Arkansas (2012–2015)
- NBA draft: 2015: undrafted
- Playing career: 2016–present

Career history
- 2016–2017: Hapoel Gilboa Galil
- 2017: Pallacanestro Cantù
- 2017–2018: Salt Lake City Stars
- 2018: Texas Legends
- 2018–2019: Wisconsin Herd
- 2019: NorthPort Batang Pier
- 2020: Al-Fateh
- 2021–2022: SCM U Craiova
- 2022: Al Riyadi
- 2023: Rain or Shine Elasto Painters
- 2023: TaiwanBeer HeroBears
- 2023: Metros de Santiago
- 2024–2025: Borneo Hornbills

Career highlights
- IBL All-Star (2025); All-IBL First Team (2024); IBL scoring champion (2024); Second-team All-SEC (2015)
- Stats at Basketball Reference

Michael Rashad Qualls (born January 20, 1994) is an American professional basketball player who last played for the Borneo Hornbills of the Indonesian Basketball League (IBL). He played college basketball for the Arkansas Razorbacks and is most notably remembered for his go-ahead slam dunk with 0.2 seconds left in overtime against Kentucky in 2014.

== High school career ==
Qualls attended Huntington High School where he led them to four district championships, including a senior season in which he averaged 17.8 points per game, guiding Huntington to 33 wins, making him the third-ranked player in the state of Louisiana in the class of 2012, with an ESPN.com scout grade of 89.

== College career ==
After graduating high school, Qualls attended Arkansas, where he appeared in 100 games (56 starts) and averaged 11.0 points, 4.5 rebounds and 1.5 assists in 23.8 minutes per game. Conference|SEC]] after averaging 15.9 points per game. He decided to forgo his final year of college eligibility and declared for the 2015 NBA draft. Qualls is perhaps best known for his slam dunk at the buzzer to beat Kentucky 87–85 in overtime at Bud Walton Arena on January 14, 2014. It was the #1 play on the ESPN Sportscenter Top 10 plays of the day.

== Professional career ==
During a workout with the Phoenix Suns prior to the 2015 draft, Qualls tore his ACL and was ruled out for six-to-12 months. Despite the injury, Qualls managed to land an NBA training camp deal, signing with the Oklahoma City Thunder on September 29, 2015. He was later waived by the Thunder on October 22 prior to the start of the regular season. On November 3, he was acquired by the Oklahoma City Blue as an affiliate player from the Thunder. On November 11, he was waived by the Blue.

On August 7, 2016, Qualls signed with Hapoel Gilboa Galil of the Israeli League. On October 10, he made his professional debut in a 77–61 loss to Hapoel Holon, recording 15 points, five rebounds and one assist in 25 minutes off the bench.

On September 23, 2017, Qualls signed with the Italian team Pallacanestro Cantù for the 2017–18 season. On October 25, he parted ways with Cantù after appearing in two games. On December 13, Qualls was acquired by the Salt Lake City Stars of the NBA G League. On March 5, 2018, he was waived by the Stars after averaging 8.4 points, 4.7 rebounds and 1.1 assists in 19.4 minutes in 18 games. Three days later, he was acquired by the Texas Legends.

Qualls was drafted in the fourth round of the 2018 NBA G League draft by the Wisconsin Herd.

In October 2019, he signed with the NorthPort Batang Pier of the Philippine Basketball Association (PBA) to replace Mychal Ammons as the team's import for the 2019 PBA Governors' Cup.

On February 23, 2020, Qualls signed with Al-Fateh of the Saudi Basketball League. On August 18, 2021, Qualls signed with SCM U Craiova of the Liga Națională.

In August 2022, Qualls joined the Al Riyadi of the Lebanese Basketball League.

On December 22, 2022, Qualls returned to the Philippines as he signed with the Rain or Shine Elasto Painters of the Philippine Basketball Association (PBA) as the team's import for the 2023 PBA Governors' Cup.

On March 3, 2023, Qualls signed with TaiwanBeer HeroBears of the T1 League.

On May 18, 2023, Qualls signed with the Metros de Santiago of the Liga Nacional de Baloncesto (LNB).

On February 22, 2024, Qualls joined the Borneo Hornbills of the Indonesian Basketball League (IBL) to replace Travion Leonard. On December 30, he returned to the Borneo Hornbills for the 2025 IBL season.

== The Basketball Tournament ==
Michael Qualls played for Team Arkansas in the 2018 edition of The Basketball Tournament. In 2 games, he averaged 22.5 points, 6 rebounds, and 1.5 blocks per game. Team Arkansas reached the second round before falling to the Talladega Knights.

== Personal life ==
The son of Anthony and grandson of Vera Thrash, Qualls has a son named Michael Jr. He majored in recreation and sports management.
