= Diamond Stone =

American basketball player (born 1997)

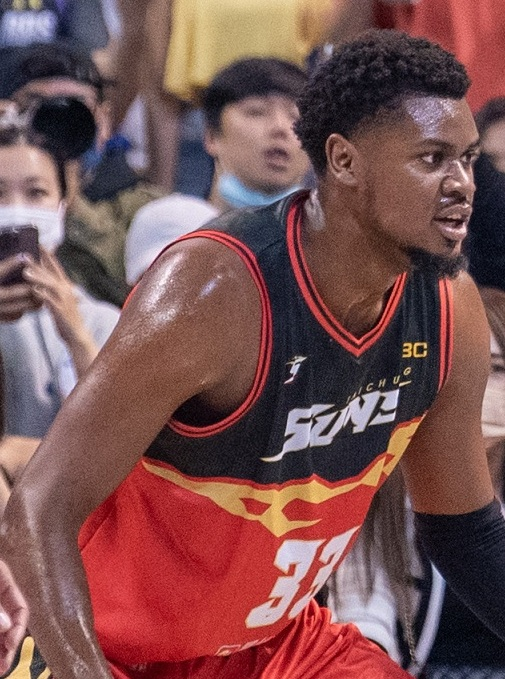
- Stone with the Taichung Suns in 2022

Free agent
- Position: Center

Personal information
- Born: February 10, 1997 (age 29) Milwaukee, Wisconsin, U.S.
- Listed height: 6 ft 10 in (208 cm)
- Listed weight: 291 lb (132 kg)

Career information
- High school: Dominican (Whitefish Bay, Wisconsin)
- College: Maryland (2015–2016)
- NBA draft: 2016: 2nd round, 40th overall pick
- Drafted by: New Orleans Pelicans
- Playing career: 2016–present

Career history
- 2016–2017: Los Angeles Clippers
- 2016: →Santa Cruz Warriors
- 2016–2017: →Salt Lake City Stars
- 2017–2018: Windy City Bulls
- 2018: Salt Lake City Stars
- 2018: Meralco Bolts
- 2018: Iowa Wolves
- 2019: Rio Grande Valley Vipers
- 2021: Mets de Guaynabo
- 2021: Gigantes de Carolina
- 2021–2022: TaiwanBeer HeroBears
- 2022: Cocodrilos de Caracas
- 2022: San Miguel Beermen
- 2022: Taichung Suns
- 2023: Zavkhan Brothers
- 2023: Marineros de Puerto Plata
- 2023: Hefei Storm
- 2023–2024: Zavkhan Brothers
- 2024: Prishtina
- 2024: Shahrdari Gorgan
- 2024: Indios de Mayagüez
- 2024–2025: Zavkhan Brothers
- 2025: Maccabi Kiryat Gat
- 2025–2026: Taipei Taishin Mars
- 2026: Zonkeys de Tijuana
- 2026: Marinos de Anzoátegui

Career highlights
- Balkan League champion (2024); T1 League points leader (2022); NBA G League champion (2019); Third-team All-Big Ten (2016); McDonald's All-American (2015); First-team Parade All-American (2015); Co-Wisconsin Mr. Basketball (2015)
- Stats at NBA.com
- Stats at Basketball Reference
Medals
Men's basketball
Representing the United States
FIBA U17 World Cup
Gold medal – first place	2014 Dubai	National team

Diamond Louis Stone (born February 10, 1997) is an American professional basketball player who last played for the Marinos de Anzoátegui of the Superliga Profesional de Baloncesto (SPB). He played one season of college basketball for the Maryland Terrapins before being drafted 40th overall in the 2016 NBA draft by the New Orleans Pelicans.

== High school career ==
Stone attended Dominican High School in Whitefish Bay, Wisconsin. As a senior, he averaged 24.4 points and 11.7 rebounds per game. He finished his career with 2,193 points. During his four years, he helped lead Dominican to four-straight WIAA Division 4 state championships.

During the 2015 McDonald's All-American Game, Stone hit 7-of-9 shots for 14 points and also had three rebounds.

A five-star recruit coming out of high school, Stone committed to Maryland in March 2015, and signed with the program in April.

== College career ==
Diamond Stone signed with Maryland. Stone averaged 12.5 points, 5.4 rebounds and 1.6 blocks in his lone season at Maryland. Named AP Big Ten Newcomer of the Year, he established the Maryland freshman record and all-time XFinity Center mark with 39 points against Penn State on December 30, 2015.

On April 11, 2016, Stone declared for the NBA draft, forgoing his final three years of college eligibility. He was later selected with the 40th overall pick in the 2016 NBA Draft.

=== College statistics ===
Diamond Stone averaged 12 points, 5 rebounds, and 0.4 assists on 56% shooting efficiency. Also, he averaged 2.7 blocks per game.

== Professional career ==
=== Los Angeles Clippers (2016–2017) ===
On June 23, 2016, Stone was selected by the New Orleans Pelicans with the 40th overall pick in the 2016 NBA draft. He was later traded to the Los Angeles Clippers on draft night. On July 14, 2016, he signed with the Clippers. Stone played only 24 minutes for the Clippers in his rookie season, but showed promise on both ends of the floor during his time in the NBA Development League; he had multiple assignments with the Santa Cruz Warriors and Salt Lake City Stars, pursuant to the flexible assignment rule.

=== Windy City Bulls and Salt Lake City Stars (2017–2018) ===
On July 6, 2017, Stone was acquired by the Atlanta Hawks in a three-team trade involving the Clippers and the Denver Nuggets. On July 31, 2017, he was waived by the Hawks. On September 14, 2017, he signed with the Chicago Bulls. He was waived by the Bulls on October 16, 2017.

Stone started the season playing for the Windy City Bulls, and was traded to the Salt Lake City Stars for Henry Sims's rights and a third-round 2018 pick.

=== Iowa Wolves (2018–2019) ===
Stone played in the summer leagues for the Utah Jazz.

On November 14, 2018, the Iowa Wolves acquired the returning right to Stone from the Salt Lake City Stars in exchange for the returning player right to Wes Washpun and a third-round draft pick in the 2019 NBA G League Draft. Later on November 26, 2018, the Iowa Wolves announced that they had acquired Stone, but was later waived by the Iowa Wolves on January 4, 2019.

=== Rio Grande Valley Vipers (2019) ===
On January 9, 2019, the Rio Grande Valley Vipers acquired Stone.

=== Puerto Rico (2021) ===
On February 3, 2021, Stone signed with the Guelph Nighthawks of the Canadian Elite Basketball League, but didn't play for them.

On July 1, 2021, Stone signed with the Mets de Guaynabo of the Baloncesto Superior Nacional. He averaged 20.4 points and 9.8 rebounds per game. On August 25, Stone signed with the Gigantes de Carolina.

=== TaiwanBeer HeroBears (2021–2022) ===
On November 9, 2021, Stone signed with the TaiwanBeer HeroBears of the T1 League. He was the league's points leader for the 2021–22 season.

=== San Miguel Beermen (2022) ===
In October 2022, he signed with the San Miguel Beermen of the Philippine Basketball Association (PBA) as the team's import for the 2022–23 PBA Commissioner's Cup.

=== Taichung Suns (2022) ===
On October 25, 2022, Stone signed with the Taichung Suns of the T1 League.

=== Zavkhan Brothers (2024–2025) ===
In October 2024, Stone joined the Zavkhan Brothers of The League.

=== Taipei Taishin Mars (2025–2026) ===
On December 16, 2025, Stone signed with the Taipei Taishin Mars of the Taiwan Professional Basketball League (TPBL).

=== Marinos de Anzoátegui (2026) ===
On February 27, 2026, Stone signed with the Marinos de Anzoátegui of the Superliga Profesional de Baloncesto (SPB).

== The Basketball Tournament ==
In the summer of 2025, Stone headlined his alma mater's alumni team, Shell Shock, in The Basketball Tournament. Stone helped Shell Shock advance to the Elite 8 before losing to Best Virginia, West Virginia's alumni team.

== NBA career statistics ==
Legend
GP	Games played	GS	Games started	MPG	Minutes per game
FG%	Field goal percentage	3P%	3-point field goal percentage	FT%	Free throw percentage
RPG	Rebounds per game	APG	Assists per game	SPG	Steals per game
BPG	Blocks per game	PPG	Points per game	**Bold**	Career high

=== Regular season ===
Year	Team	GP	GS	MPG	FG%	3P%	FT%	RPG	APG	SPG	BPG	PPG
2016–17	L.A. Clippers	7	0	3.5	.231	.000	1.000	.9	.0	.0	.1	1.4
Career		7	0	3.5	.231	.000	1.000	.9	.0	.0	.1	1.4

== National team career ==
Stone was named to the All-Tournament Team of the 2014 FIBA Under-17 World Championship.
