= TaiwanBeer HeroBears =

Professional basketball team in Taiwan

- Leagues: T1 League
- Founded: September 2, 2021
- Folded: June 26, 2023
- History: TaiwanBeer HeroBears; 2021–2023
- Arena: University of Taipei Tianmu Campus Gymnasium (2021–23); Taipei Heping Basketball Gymnasium (2022); Fu Jen Catholic University Chung Mei Auditorium (2023)
- Location: Taipei City, Taiwan
- Team colors: Green, golden, black, white
- General manager: Ha Hsiao-Yuan
- Head coach: Yang Chih-Hao
- Ownership: Taiwan Tobacco and Liquor Corporation
- Championships: 0

The TaiwanBeer HeroBears (Chinese: 台灣啤酒英熊) were a Taiwanese professional basketball team based in Taipei City. They had competed in the T1 League and played their home games at the University of Taipei Tianmu Campus Gymnasium (2021–23), Taipei Heping Basketball Gymnasium (2022), and Fu Jen Catholic University Chung Mei Auditorium (2023). The HeroBears became one of the six teams of the inaugural T1 League season.

== Franchise history ==
In 2021, following the establishment of the T1 League, the Super Basketball League's Taiwan Beer split into two teams, one of which joined the T1 League as the TaiwanBeer HeroBears.

On June 26, 2023, the T1 League announced that the Taishin Sports Entertainment Co., Ltd., part of the Taishin Financial Holdings, took over the participation rights of the TaiwanBeer HeroBears.

== Facilities ==
=== Home arenas ===
Arena	Location	Duration
Fu Jen Catholic University Chung Mei Auditorium	New Taipei City	2023
Taipei Heping Basketball Gymnasium	Taipei City	2022
University of Taipei Tianmu Campus Gymnasium	Taipei City	2021–2023

=== Training facilities ===
The HeroBears' training facility was located at the Taiwan Beer gymnasium.

== Last roster ==
2022–23 TaiwanBeer HeroBears roster
Players
Coaches

Pos.	No.	Nat.	Name	Ht.	Wt.	Age	From
SG	0	(Taiwan)	Huang Jhen	1.93 m (6 ft 4 in)	86 kg (190 lb)	32 – 27 June 1990	FJU
F	7	(United States)	Perry Jones (I)	2.11 m (6 ft 11 in)	107 kg (236 lb)	31 – 24 September 1991	Baylor
SG	11	(Taiwan)	Huang Tsung-Han	1.93 m (6 ft 4 in)	86 kg (190 lb)	28 – 7 July 1994	MDU
PG	14	(Taiwan)	Chiang Yu-An (C)	1.74 m (5 ft 9 in)	65 kg (143 lb)	31 – 4 August 1991	NTUS
C	15	(Taiwan)	Fan Shih-En	1.98 m (6 ft 6 in)	82 kg (181 lb)	28 – 1 June 1994	NTUST
PG	19	(Taiwan)	Yang Tian-You	1.72 m (5 ft 8 in)	73 kg (161 lb)	29 – 24 September 1993	UKN
PF	20	(Taiwan)	Chou Po-Hsun	1.97 m (6 ft 6 in)	85 kg (187 lb)	32 – 6 March 1991	MDU
SF	24	(Taiwan)	Chu I-Tsung	1.86 m (6 ft 1 in)	85 kg (187 lb)	36 – 4 August 1986	HWU
PG	27	(Taiwan)	Liang Hao-Zhen	1.84 m (6 ft 0 in)	80 kg (176 lb)	27 – 4 December 1995	UKN
C	34	(Tanzania)	Hasheem Thabeet (I)	2.21 m (7 ft 3 in)	118 kg (260 lb)	36 – 16 February 1987	UConn
G	45	(United States)	Michael Qualls (I)	1.93 m (6 ft 4 in)	92 kg (203 lb)	29 – 20 January 1994	Arkansas
PG	57	(Taiwan) (Vietnam)	Tsao Xun-Xiang	1.81 m (5 ft 11 in)	78 kg (172 lb)	24 – 16 March 1999	NTUA
SG	75	(Taiwan)	Lee Chi-Wei	1.92 m (6 ft 4 in)	87 kg (192 lb)	30 – 8 April 1993	MDU

Head coach

- (Taiwan) Yang Chih-Hao

Assistant coach(es)

- (Taiwan) Huang Chih-Tsai

Team manager

- (Taiwan) Ha Hsiao-Yuan

Legend

- (C) Team captain
- (I) Import player
- Injured

- Roster
Updated: April 4, 2023

== Head coaches ==
Name	Tenure	Totals				Regular season				Playoffs			
Name	Tenure	G	W	L	PCT	G	W	L	PCT	G	W	L	PCT
(Taiwan) Yang Chih-Hao	2021–2023	65	33	32	.508	60	32	28	.533	5	1	4	.200
Totals		65	33	32	.508	60	32	28	.533	5	1	4	.200

== Season-by-season record ==
Season	League	Coach	Regular season				Postseason
Season	League	Coach	Won	Lost	Win %	Finish	Postseason
2021–22	T1	Yang Chih-Hao	16	14	.533	4th	Won play-in (Leopards) 2–0; Lost semifinals (Aquas) 0–2
2022–23	T1	Yang Chih-Hao	16	14	.533	4th	Lost play-in (Suns) 1–2
Totals			32	28	.533	–	2 Playoff appearances

== Notable players ==
Local players

- (Taiwan) Chiang Yu-An (蔣淯安) – Chinese Taipei national team player, SBL Finals MVP (2020), SBL MVP (2019, 2020), T1 League MVP (2022)
- (Taiwan) Chou Po-Hsun (周伯勳) – Chinese Taipei national team player
- (Taiwan) Fan Shih-En (范士恩) – Chinese Taipei national team player
- (Taiwan) Huang Jhen (黃鎮) – Chinese Taipei national team player
- (Taiwan) Huang Tsung-Han (黃聰翰) – Chinese Taipei national team player
- (Taiwan) Lee Chi-Wei (李啟瑋) – Chinese Taipei national team player

Type-III players

- (United States) Tyler Lamb – Thailand national team player

Import players

- (United States) Branden Dawson – NBA player
- (Italy) Samuel Deguara – Malta national team player
- (United States) Cleanthony Early – NBA player
- Matt Hodgson – Australia national team player
- (United States) Prince Ibeh – Rwanda national team player
- (United States) Perry Jones – NBA player
- (United States) Tony Mitchell – NBA player
- (United States) Diamond Stone – NBA player
- (Tanzania) Hasheem Thabeet – NBA player
