= Taichung Suns =

Professional basketball team in Taiwan

- Leagues: T1 League
- Founded: 2021
- Folded: 2023
- History: Taichung Wagor Suns; 2021–2022; Taichung Suns; 2022–2023
- Arena: National Taiwan University of Sport Gymnasium
- Capacity: 6,243
- Location: Taichung City, Taiwan
- Team colors: Red, golden, white, black
- President: Sun Tzu-Chuan
- General manager: Wang Wei-Chieh
- Championships: 0
- Website: www.taichungsuns.tw

The Taichung Suns (Chinese: 臺中太陽) were a Taiwanese professional basketball team based in Taichung City. They competed in the T1 League and played their home games at the National Taiwan University of Sport Gymnasium. The Suns became one of the six teams of the inaugural T1 League season.

== Franchise history ==
On June 19, 2021, the Taichung Suns was established formally. On November 25, the Taichung Suns changed the name to the Taichung Wagor Suns.

In October 2022, the Taichung Wagor Suns changed the name to the Taichung Suns.

On September 15, 2023, the T1 League announced that the 2023–24 season participation rights of the Taichung Suns was cancelled due to financial qualification. On October 16, the Taichung Suns announced to fold officially.

== Facilities ==
=== Home arenas ===
Arena	Location	Duration
National Taiwan University of Sport Gymnasium	Taichung City	2021–2023

== Last roster ==
2022–23 Taichung Suns roster
Players
Coaches

Pos.	No.	Nat.	Name	Ht.	Wt.	Age	From
C	0	(Saint Vincent and the Grenadines)	Austin Derrick (I)	1.98 m (6 ft 6 in)	115 kg (254 lb)	27 – 31 July 1995	UCH
PF/C	1	(United States)	Arnett Moultrie (I)	2.10 m (6 ft 11 in)	118 kg (260 lb)	32 – 18 November 1990	Mississippi State
PG	3	(Taiwan)	Ting Sheng-Ju	1.74 m (5 ft 9 in)	70 kg (154 lb)	24 – 22 August 1998	St. Francis
PG	4	(Taiwan)	Kao Meng-Wei	1.75 m (5 ft 9 in)	70 kg (154 lb)	26 – 13 September 1996	NTCUST
PG	5	(Taiwan)	Peng Chun-Yen	1.85 m (6 ft 1 in)	84 kg (185 lb)	33 – 5 December 1989	MDU
PG	6	(Mongolia)	Delgerchuluun Bayasgalan (SFS)	1.81 m (5 ft 11 in)	75 kg (165 lb)	25 – 30 October 1997	HDUT
SF	8	(Taiwan)	Chen Wen-Hung	1.85 m (6 ft 1 in)	80 kg (176 lb)	31 – 14 July 1991	NTSU
SG	11	(Taiwan)	Yang Cheng-Han	1.86 m (6 ft 1 in)	77 kg (170 lb)	23 – 10 October 1999	FJU
PG	13	(Taiwan)	Lee Ming-Xiu	1.82 m (6 ft 0 in)	82 kg (181 lb)	22 – 1 June 2000	NTUS
SF	14	(Taiwan)	Tung Yung-Chuan	1.91 m (6 ft 3 in)	87 kg (192 lb)	23 – 14 October 1999	NTNU
G/F	20	(United States) (Taiwan)	Derek King	1.90 m (6 ft 3 in)	90 kg (198 lb)	29 – 13 September 1993	UC Berkeley
SG	24	(United States)	Rayvonte Rice (I)	1.93 m (6 ft 4 in)	109 kg (240 lb)	30 – 14 July 1992	Illinois
PF/C	34	(United States)	Keith Benson (I)	2.11 m (6 ft 11 in)	112 kg (247 lb)	34 – 13 August 1988	Oakland
PF	41	(Taiwan)	Su Yi-Chin	2.00 m (6 ft 7 in)	95 kg (209 lb)	29 – 29 December 1993	MDU
SG	42	(Taiwan)	Lu Kuan-Hsuan	1.85 m (6 ft 1 in)	84 kg (185 lb)	28 – 2 April 1995	NTNU
PF	45	(Taiwan)	Wen Li-Huang	2.02 m (6 ft 8 in)	96 kg (212 lb)	29 – 26 October 1993	ISU
PG	76	(Taiwan)	Lin Ming-Yi	1.77 m (5 ft 10 in)	72 kg (159 lb)	27 – 27 March 1996	MDU

Head coach

- (Philippines) Chris Gavina

Assistant coach(es)

- (Philippines) Niño Canaleta
- (Taiwan) Chou Ying-Chou
- (Taiwan) Hsu Chih-Chao

Strength & conditioning coach(es)

- (Taiwan) Weng Chien-Kai

Athletic trainer(s)

- (Taiwan) Huang Chi-Chun

Team manager

- (Taiwan) Wang Wei-Chieh

Legend

- (C) Team captain
- (I) Import player
- (SFS) Special foreign student
- Injured

- Roster
- Transactions
Updated: March 8, 2023

== Season-by-season record ==
Season	League	Coach	Regular season				Postseason
Season	League	Coach	Won	Lost	Win %	Finish	Postseason
2021–22	T1	Iurgi Caminos	20	10	.667	2nd	Won semifinals (DEA) 2–1; Lost finals (Aquas) 0–3
2022–23	T1	Alberto Garcia	8	22	.267	5th	Won play-in (HeroBears) 2–1; Lost semifinals ( DEA) 0–3
2022–23	T1	Chris Gavina	8	22	.267	5th	Won play-in (HeroBears) 2–1; Lost semifinals ( DEA) 0–3
Totals			28	32	.467	–	2 Playoff appearances

== Notable players ==
Local players

- (Taiwan) Chen Ching-Huan (陳靖寰) – Chinese Taipei national team player
- (Taiwan) Peng Chun-Yen (彭俊諺) – Chinese Taipei national team player
- (Taiwan) Su Yi-Chin (蘇奕晉) – Chinese Taipei national team player
- (Taiwan) Sun Szu-Yao (孫思堯) – Chinese Taipei national team player

Type-III players

- (Australia) Jordan Heading – Philippines national team player

Import players

- (United States) Keith Benson – NBA player
- (United States) Tony Bishop – Panama national team player
- Alonzo Gee – NBA player, United States national team player
- (United Kingdom) Aaron Geramipoor – Iran national team player
- (United States) Arnett Moultrie – NBA player
- Sani Sakakini – Palestine national team player
- (United States) Diamond Stone – NBA player
- (United States) Julian Wright – NBA player
