= MingDao University =

University in Pitou, Changhua County, Taiwan

- 明道大學
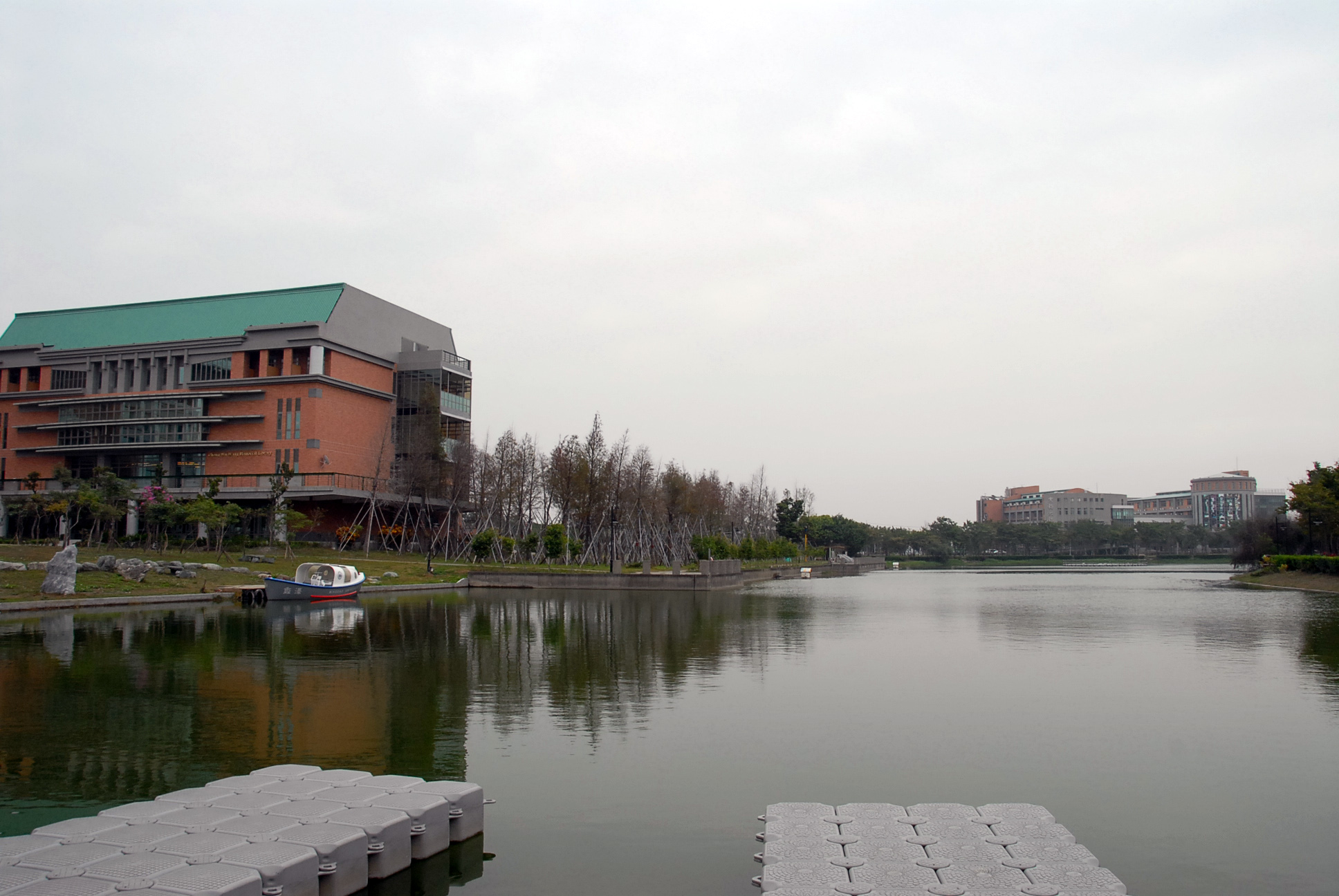
- Motto: 明善誠身
- Motto in English: Wisdom, Virtue, Honesty, Progress
- Type: Private
- Active: 2001–1 August 2024
- Location: Pitou, Changhua County, Taiwan; 23.8705°N 120.4949°E
- Website: Official website

MingDao University
- Traditional Chinese: 明道大學
Transcriptions
Standard Mandarin
- Hanyu Pinyin: Míngdào Dàxué
Southern Min
- Hokkien POJ: Bêng-tō Tāi-ha̍k

MingDao University (MDU; Chinese: 明道大學; Pe̍h-ōe-jī: Bêng-tō Tāi-ha̍k) was a private university located in Pitou Township, Changhua County, Taiwan.

The institution was founded as the MingDao School of Management in 2001, and was accorded university status by the Ministry of Education (ROC) in 2007.

In 2020, the university had an enrollment rate of less than 60%. It was scheduled to shut down in 2024, and did so on August 1.

== Faculties ==
- College of Applied Science
- College of Design
- College of Hospitality and Tourism Management
- College of Humanities
- College of Management

== Research ==
MingDao's specialized areas of research included renewable energy engineering (especially solar, wind, and hydrogen), and its Department of Post Modern Agriculture was active in the promotion of organic agriculture across East and Southeast Asia.

- Institute of Chinese Studies
- Graduate Institute of Curriculum and Instruction
- Mandarin Training Center (MTC)
- Sustainable Energy Research Center
- Photovoltaics Research Center
- Surface Engineering Research Center
- Agriculture and Biotechnology Research Center

== International student complaint ==
In November 2018 it was reported in Eswatini that Mingdao University tricked more than 40 Eswatini students in working full five-day shifts in a chicken processing plant.

MingDao University recruited over 40 students from Eswatini to take part in a work-study program called the "Taiwan Work/Study Scholarship". According to its June 2018 advertisement, the students would earn a wage sufficient to cover their expenses as students, while working toward a bachelor's degree in business administration.

The students were instead directed to peel chicken skin in a chilled factory environment. One student likened the situation to "slavery", alleging they could not simply leave since the university would punish those remaining behind.

Yu Jung-hui (尤榮輝), chairman of the Union of Private School Educators (UPRISE), called for an investigation and said that 47 students were used for "slave labor" and that MingDao University is "almost an international fraud". Taiwan News noted the similarity to an incident where Sri Lankan students from the University of Kang Ning were duped into working in a slaughterhouse.

== See also ==
- List of universities in Taiwan
