= University of Kang Ning =

University in Annan, Tainan, Taiwan

- 康寧大學
- Motto: 創新 創意 創未來(Pe̍h-ōe-jī: Chhòng-sin, chhòng-ì, chhòng-bī-lâi)
- Motto in English: Innovation, Creativity & Future-building!
- Type: private
- Established: 2011
- Location: Annan, Tainan, Taiwan; 23°3′31.9″N 120°9′15.7″E
- Website: ukn.edu.tw

University of Kang Ning
- Traditional Chinese: 康寧大學
Transcriptions
Standard Mandarin
- Hanyu Pinyin: Kāngníng Dàxué
Southern Min
- Hokkien POJ: Khong-lêng Tāi-ha̍k

University of Kang Ning (UKN; Chinese: 康寧大學; Pe̍h-ōe-jī: Khong-lêng Tāi-ha̍k) is a private university located in Neihu District, Tainan, Taiwan. It is named after Kang Ning, a famous Taiwanese doctor who is known for his contributions to the field of medical care.

The University of Kang Ning has a diverse range of academic programs, including medicine, nursing, management, humanities, and social sciences. Some of its most popular programs include nursing, physical therapy, and business administration.

== History ==
The university was established in 2011. In 2018, Kang-Ning Junior College of Medical Care and Management was merged into the university.

== Faculties ==
- College of Management
- College of Health and Leisure
- College of Humanities and Information

== International students exploitation ==
Over 40 Sri Lankan students duped into working in Taiwan slaughterhouses. The director of the Tainan campus of Kang Ning coordinated with brokers in dispatching the Sri Lankan students to work in underground factories and poultry slaughterhouses.

Kang Ning senior officials reportedly said to the students, "As long as you pay for your air tickets, you can go to Taiwan to study for free, and you can earn money by working part-time." However, later, Yen Kang-tsung (閻亢宗), Chief Secretary of the University of Kang Ning said that arrangements had been made for the students to work illegally by the "fake brokers" before they came to the university to attend classes, and the school had issued work permits. Yen said the school was completely unaware of the situation.

A Sri Lankan student was quoted as saying, "I regret studying in Taiwan, and I don't trust Taiwanese anymore." Of the 61 students from Sri Lanka originally enrolled at the university, 20 have since returned home, while 41 still remain.

== See also ==
- List of universities in Taiwan
