= 2022–23 New Taipei CTBC DEA season =

Taiwanese professional basketball season

- T1 League champions
- President: Chen Kuo-En
- General Manager: Chang Shu-Jen (transferred to T1 League secretary general); Liu Chih-Wei
- Head Coach: Lee Yi-Hua
- Arena: Xinzhuang Gymnasium

T1 League results
- Record: 25–5 (83.3%)
- Place: 1st
- Playoffs finish: Champions (1st title) (defeated GhostHawks, 4–0)

Player records
- Points: Mohammad Al Bachir Gadiaga 18.9
- Rebounds: Edgaras Želionis 10.2
- Assists: Lin Wei-Han 10.0

The 2022–23 New Taipei CTBC DEA season was the franchise's second season, its second season in the T1 League.

The DEA were coached by Lee Yi-Hua in his second year as their head coach. On September 5, 2022, the T1 League hired Chang Shu-Jen, the general manager of the New Taipei CTBC DEA, as their new secretary general. And the DEA hired Liu Chih-Wei, the general manager of the CTBC Brothers, as their new general manager.

== Draft ==
Round	Player	Position(s)	School / club team
2	Chen Yu-An	Forward	UT

- Reference：

On July 11, 2022, the DEA's 2022 first-round pick was traded to Kaohsiung Aquas in exchange for cash considerations.

== Roster ==
2022–23 New Taipei CTBC DEA roster
Players
Coaches

Pos.	No.	Nat.	Name	Ht.	Wt.	Age	From
SF	0	(Taiwan)	Mohammad Al Bachir Gadiaga	1.89 m (6 ft 2 in)	92 kg (203 lb)	25 – 27 April 1998	SHU
C	1	(Lithuania)	Edgaras Želionis (I)	2.07 m (6 ft 9 in)	97 kg (214 lb)	33 – 4 June 1989	Lithuania
PG	2	(Taiwan)	Liu Jen-Hao	1.75 m (5 ft 9 in)	69 kg (152 lb)	27 – 10 November 1995	UCH
SG	3	(Taiwan)	Lin Ping-Sheng	1.86 m (6 ft 1 in)	80 kg (176 lb)	26 – 26 December 1996	CCU
PF	4	(Taiwan)	Liu Min-Yan	1.95 m (6 ft 5 in)	85 kg (187 lb)	23 – 4 December 1999	NKNU
PG	6	(Taiwan)	Lee Hsueh-Lin (C)	1.75 m (5 ft 9 in)	81 kg (179 lb)	39 – 31 January 1984	TPEC
PG	7	(Taiwan)	Wei Chia-Hao	1.82 m (6 ft 0 in)	78 kg (172 lb)	23 – 13 January 2000	FJU
SG	8	(Taiwan)	Tung Fang Yi-Kang	1.81 m (5 ft 11 in)	81 kg (179 lb)	25 – 12 October 1997	NYCU
C	9	(Croatia)	Kristijan Krajina (I)	2.08 m (6 ft 10 in)	111 kg (245 lb)	32 – 28 December 1990	Mount St. Mary's
SG	10	(Taiwan)	Hsieh Ya-Hsuan	1.87 m (6 ft 2 in)	81 kg (179 lb)	24 – 30 October 1998	UCH
PF	11	(Taiwan)	Zhou Cheng-Rui	1.93 m (6 ft 4 in)	82 kg (181 lb)	23 – 24 February 2000	CCU
PF	12	(Taiwan) (United Kingdom)	Jonah Morrison	2.03 m (6 ft 8 in)	105 kg (231 lb)	22 – 2 June 2000	UBC
PF	13	(Taiwan)	Chen Yu-An	1.92 m (6 ft 4 in)	88 kg (194 lb)	22 – 26 May 2000	UT
C	14	(Latvia)	Kaspars Bērziņš (I)	2.13 m (7 ft 0 in)	102 kg (225 lb)	37 – 25 August 1985	Latvia
PG	16	(Taiwan)	Lin Wei-Han	1.78 m (5 ft 10 in)	71 kg (157 lb)	32 – 9 July 1990	FJU
SF	30	(Taiwan)	Liu Weir-Chern	1.90 m (6 ft 3 in)	84 kg (185 lb)	34 – 27 November 1988	MDU
F	55	(United States)	Nick King (I)	2.03 m (6 ft 8 in)	102 kg (225 lb)	27 – 5 August 1995	Middle Tennessee
C	76	(Taiwan)	Tseng Wen-Ting	2.04 m (6 ft 8 in)	98 kg (216 lb)	38 – 6 July 1984	TPEC

Head coach

- (Taiwan) Lee Yi-Hua

Assistant coach(es)

- (Serbia) Momir Ratković

Strength & conditioning coach(es)

- (Taiwan) Mu Chien-Hung

Athletic trainer(s)

- (Taiwan) Li Kuo-Yi
- (Taiwan) Fan Hsiang-Yu

Team manager

- (Taiwan) Liu Chih-Wei

Legend

- (C) Team captain
- (I) Import player
- Injured

- Roster
Updated: February 21, 2023

== 2022 interleague play ==
=== Standings ===
Pos	Team	Pld	W	L	PCT	GB	Qualification
1	New Taipei CTBC DEA	5	5	0	1.000	—	Advance to Quarterfinals
2	Bank of Taiwan	5	3	2	.600	2	Advance to Quarterfinals
3	Hsinchu JKO Lioneers	5	3	2	.600	2	
4	Taoyuan Leopards	5	2	3	.400	3	
5	Taichung Suns	5	2	3	.400	3	
6	Taiwan Beer	5	0	5	.000	5	

Source: Official website

=== Group match ===
September 17, 2022	New Taipei CTBC DEA	94–62	Taoyuan Leopards	Taipei City
19:30 (UTC+8)	Scoring by quarter: 24–7, 20–16, 18–19, 34–20
	Pts: Mohammad Al Bachir Gadiaga 36; Rebs: Mohammad Al Bachir Gadiaga 8 Asts: Lin Wei-Han 10	boxscore	Pts: Chen Hsiao-Jung, Cheng Wei 21; Rebs: Tseng Pin-Fu 14; Asts: Lu Chieh-Min 5	Arena: Taipei Heping Basketball Gymnasium

September 19, 2022	Hsinchu JKO Lioneers	68–76	New Taipei CTBC DEA	Taipei City
17:00 (UTC+8)	Scoring by quarter: 10–19, 14–22, 19–26, 25–9
	Pts: Chu Yun-Hao 14; Rebs: Ifeanyi Eboka 11; Asts: Lin Ming-Yi 4	boxscore	Pts: Mohammad Al Bachir Gadiaga 28; Rebs: Jonah Morrison 12; Asts: Mohammad Al Bachir Gadiaga 4	Arena: Taipei Heping Basketball Gymnasium

September 21, 2022	New Taipei CTBC DEA	102–86	Bank of Taiwan	Taipei City
15:00 (UTC+8)	Scoring by quarter: 29–22, 26–22, 22–20, 25–22
	Pts: Mohammad Al Bachir Gadiaga 29; Rebs: Mohammad Al Bachir Gadiaga 13; Asts: Lin Wei-Han 10	boxscore	Pts: Pan Hsiang-Wei 15; Rebs: Chen You-Hsu 6 Asts: Tsen Kai-Hsuan, Chang Chia-He 6	Arena: Taipei Heping Basketball Gymnasium

September 23, 2022	Taiwan Beer	54–77	New Taipei CTBC DEA	Taipei City
17:00 (UTC+8)	Scoring by quarter: 14–13, 12–18, 16–18, 12–28
	Pts: Humphery Gabriel 16; Rebs: Humphery Gabriel 18; Asts: Chen Yu-Han 6	boxscore	Pts: Mohammad Al Bachir Gadiaga 31; Rebs: Jonah Morrison 13; Asts: Lin Wei-Han 9	Arena: Taipei Heping Basketball Gymnasium

September 24, 2022	New Taipei CTBC DEA	82–50	Taichung Suns	Taipei City
13:00 (UTC+8)	Scoring by quarter: 17–17, 23–4, 27–14, 15–15
	Pts: Tung Fang Yi-Kang, Hsieh Ya-Hsuan 14; Rebs: Mohammad Al Bachir Gadiaga, Wei Chia-Hao 8 Asts: Wei Chia-Hao 9	boxscore	Pts: Su Yi-Chin 20; Rebs: Chang Chia-Jung 7 Asts: three players 2	Arena: Taipei Heping Basketball Gymnasium

=== Quarterfinals ===
September 25, 2022	New Taipei CTBC DEA	75–67	Yulon Luxgen Dinos	Taipei City
17:00 (UTC+8)	Scoring by quarter: 20–18, 27–22, 15–16, 13–11
	Pts: Mohammad Al Bachir Gadiaga 17; Rebs: Mohammad Al Bachir Gadiaga 12; Asts: Wei Chia-Hao 7	boxscore	Pts: Sarr Cheikh Ahmadou Bamba 22; Rebs: Sarr Cheikh Ahmadou Bamba 15; Asts: Sarr Cheikh Ahmadou Bamba 3	Arena: Taipei Heping Basketball Gymnasium

=== Semifinals ===
September 26, 2022	Chinese Taipei National Training Team	78–87	New Taipei CTBC DEA	Taipei City
17:00 (UTC+8)	Scoring by quarter: 21–12, 12–26, 14–32, 31–20
	Pts: Lin Sin-Kuan 21; Rebs: Lin Sin-Kuan 7 Asts: Kao Chin-Wei, Liu Cheng-Yen 6	boxscore	Pts: Mohammad Al Bachir Gadiaga 34; Rebs: Jonah Morrison 12; Asts: Lin Wei-Han 14	Arena: Taipei Heping Basketball Gymnasium

=== Finals ===
September 27, 2022	New Taipei CTBC DEA	74–87	TaiwanBeer HeroBears	Taipei City
19:00 (UTC+8)	Scoring by quarter: 15–21, 20–29, 28–14, 11–23
	Pts: Mohammad Al Bachir Gadiaga 22; Rebs: Mohammad Al Bachir Gadiaga 11; Asts: Lin Wei-Han 9	boxscore	Pts: Huang Tsung-Han 27; Rebs: Chou Po-Hsun 12; Asts: Lee Chi-Wei 6	Arena: Taipei Heping Basketball Gymnasium

== Preseason ==
=== Game log ===
2022 preseason game log
Total: 2–0 (home: 1–0; road: 1–0)
Preseason : 2–0 (home: 1–0; road: 1–0)

Game	Date	Team	Score	High points	High rebounds	High assists	Location Attendance	Record
1	October 14	Aquas	W 116–115	Edgaras Želionis (26); Lin Wei-Han (26)	Edgaras Želionis (12)	Lin Wei-Han (8)	Xinzhuang Gymnasium	1–0
2	October 15	@ Leopards	W 115–72	Wei Chia-Hao (19)	Jonah Morrison (12)	Wei Chia-Hao (6)	Xinzhuang Gymnasium; 3,145	2–0

Color： Win Lose
Schedule

== Regular season ==
=== Standings ===
Pos	Team	Pld	W	L	PCT	GB	Qualification
1	New Taipei CTBC DEA	30	25	5	.833	—	Advance to semifinals
2	Tainan TSG GhostHawks	30	19	11	.633	6	Advance to semifinals
3	Kaohsiung Aquas	30	16	14	.533	9	Advance to semifinals
4	TaiwanBeer HeroBears	30	16	14	.533	9	Advance to play-in
5	Taichung Suns	30	8	22	.267	17	Advance to play-in
6	Taoyuan Leopards	30	6	24	.200	19	

Source: T1 League

With a victory against the TaiwanBeer HeroBears on April 3, 2023, the DEA clinched the league's best record for the 2022–23 season.

=== Game log ===
2022–23 regular season game log
Total: 25–5 (home: 15–0; road: 10–5)
October : 2–0 (home: 2–0; road: 0–0)

Game	Date	Team	Score	High points	High rebounds	High assists	Location Attendance	Record
1	October 29	Aquas	W 109–87	Edgaras Želionis (22)	Edgaras Želionis (6); Kristijan Krajina (6)	Lin Wei-Han (9)	Xinzhuang Gymnasium; 5,652	1–0
2	October 30	GhostHawks	W 101–98	Edgaras Želionis (20)	Kristijan Krajina (7); Lin Ping-Sheng (7)	Lin Wei-Han (12)	Xinzhuang Gymnasium; 3,939	2–0

November : 1–3 (home: 0–0; road: 1–3)

Game	Date	Team	Score	High points	High rebounds	High assists	Location Attendance	Record
3	November 6	@ Suns	L 109–112	Edgaras Želionis (25)	Mohammad Al Bachir Gadiaga (7); Kristijan Krajina (7)	Lin Wei-Han (11)	National Taiwan University of Sport Gymnasium; 2,861	2–1
4	November 12	@ GhostHawks	W 107–104	Mohammad Al Bachir Gadiaga (28)	Mohammad Al Bachir Gadiaga (12)	Lin Wei-Han (6)	Chia Nan University of Pharmacy and Science Shao Tsung Gymnasium; 2,200	3–1
5	November 19	@ Leopards	L 115–120 (OT)	Mohammad Al Bachir Gadiaga (51)	Kristijan Krajina (15)	Lin Wei-Han (11)	National Taiwan Sport University Arena; 15,000	3–2
6	November 26	@ Aquas	L 81–105	Mohammad Al Bachir Gadiaga (17); Edgaras Želionis (17)	Edgaras Želionis (10)	Lin Wei-Han (6)	Kaohsiung Arena; 10,823	3–3

December : 5–0 (home: 4–0; road: 1–0)

Game	Date	Team	Score	High points	High rebounds	High assists	Location Attendance	Record
7	December 3	@ HeroBears	W 117–103	Mohammad Al Bachir Gadiaga (25)	Kristijan Krajina (11)	Lin Wei-Han (11)	University of Taipei Tianmu Campus Gymnasium; 3,168	4–3
8	December 17	Leopards	W 103–94	Edgaras Želionis (31)	Lin Wei-Han (11)	Lin Wei-Han (12)	Xinzhuang Gymnasium; 6,540	5–3
9	December 18	GhostHawks	W 101–93	Kristijan Krajina (21)	Demitrius Conger (12)	Lin Wei-Han (10)	Xinzhuang Gymnasium; 3,108	6–3
10	December 24	Aquas	W 93–85	Mohammad Al Bachir Gadiaga (27)	Edgaras Želionis (18)	Wei Chia-Hao (6)	Xinzhuang Gymnasium; 3,495	7–3
11	December 25	HeroBears	W 88–81	Edgaras Želionis (25)	Edgaras Želionis (16)	Lin Ping-Sheng (6)	Xinzhuang Gymnasium; 3,401	8–3

January : 2–1 (home: 0–0; road: 2–1)

Game	Date	Team	Score	High points	High rebounds	High assists	Location Attendance	Record
12	January 2	@ HeroBears	W 112–75	Mohammad Al Bachir Gadiaga (22); Hsieh Ya-Hsuan (22)	Kristijan Krajina (11)	Lin Ping-Sheng (11)	University of Taipei Tianmu Campus Gymnasium; 2,323	9–3
13	January 8	@ Aquas	L 87–105	Mohammad Al Bachir Gadiaga (19); Demitrius Conger (19)	Kristijan Krajina (10); Demitrius Conger (10)	Kristijan Krajina (6)	Kaohsiung Arena; 5,495	9–4
14	January 14	@ GhostHawks	W 116–111	Edgaras Želionis (29)	Edgaras Želionis (15)	Lin Ping-Sheng (7)	Chia Nan University of Pharmacy and Science Shao Tsung Gymnasium; 1,100	10–4

February : 4–0 (home: 2–0; road: 2–0)

Game	Date	Team	Score	High points	High rebounds	High assists	Location Attendance	Record
15	February 4	@ Suns	W 110–100	Nick King (41)	Mohammad Al Bachir Gadiaga (11)	Hsieh Ya-Hsuan (9); Lin Ping-Sheng (9)	National Taiwan University of Sport Gymnasium; 1,829	11–4
16	February 11	@ Aquas	W 88–77	Nick King (22)	Edgaras Želionis (13)	Lin Ping-Sheng (6)	Kaohsiung Arena; 4,266	12–4
17	February 25	Aquas	W 93–86	Nick King (33)	Kaspars Bērziņš (11)	Lin Wei-Han (9)	Xinzhuang Gymnasium; 4,271	13–4
18	February 26	Leopards	W 102–95	Hsieh Ya-Hsuan (34)	Edgaras Želionis (17)	Lin Wei-Han (15)	Xinzhuang Gymnasium; 5,952	14–4

March : 6–0 (home: 4–0; road: 2–0)

Game	Date	Team	Score	High points	High rebounds	High assists	Location Attendance	Record
19	March 4	Suns	W 96–88	Nick King (27)	Edgaras Želionis (20)	Lin Ping-Sheng (8)	Xinzhuang Gymnasium; 3,308	15–4
20	March 5	Leopards	W 101–95	Nick King (27); Edgaras Želionis (27)	Nick King (10)	Lin Wei-Han (13)	Xinzhuang Gymnasium; 5,067	16–4
21	March 11	@ Leopards	W 89–79	Nick King (25)	Edgaras Želionis (16)	Lin Wei-Han (5)	National Taiwan Sport University Arena; 11,036	17–4
22	March 19	@ Suns	W 97–82	Nick King (28)	Kaspars Bērziņš (16)	Lin Wei-Han (10)	National Taiwan University of Sport Gymnasium; 1,854	18–4
23	March 25	HeroBears	W 101–86	Nick King (22)	Kristijan Krajina (11); Nick King (11)	Nick King (10)	Xinzhuang Gymnasium; 4,183	19–4
24	March 26	Suns	W 112–93	Hsieh Ya-Hsuan (22)	Kristijan Krajina (10)	Lin Wei-Han (12)	Xinzhuang Gymnasium; 3,271	20–4

April : 5–1 (home: 3–0; road: 2–1)

Game	Date	Team	Score	High points	High rebounds	High assists	Location Attendance	Record
25	April 3	HeroBears	W 103–88	Mohammad Al Bachir Gadiaga (19)	Kristijan Krajina (16)	Lin Wei-Han (12)	Xinzhuang Gymnasium; 3,772	21–4
26	April 4	@ Leopards	W 108–92	Nick King (42)	Kristijan Krajina (10); Nick King (10)	Wei Chia-Hao (5); Lin Ping-Sheng (5)	National Taiwan Sport University Arena; 7,108	22–4
27	April 8	@ HeroBears	L 96–112	Nick King (20)	Kristijan Krajina (11)	Nick King (6)	Fu Jen Catholic University Chung Mei Auditorium; 1,373	22–5
28	April 16	@ GhostHawks	W 114–105	Mohammad Al Bachir Gadiaga (30)	Nick King (9)	Lin Ping-Sheng (8)	Chia Nan University of Pharmacy and Science Shao Tsung Gymnasium; 1,703	23–5
29	April 22	GhostHawks	W 114–102	Nick King (25)	Kristijan Krajina (7); Kaspars Bērziņš (7)	Lin Wei-Han (13)	Xinzhuang Gymnasium; 3,911	24–5
30	April 23	Suns	W 95–79	Mohammad Al Bachir Gadiaga (13); Kristijan Krajina (13)	Kristijan Krajina (12)	Lin Ping-Sheng (5); Lee Hsueh-Lin (5); Wei Chia-Hao (5); Nick King (5)	Xinzhuang Gymnasium; 3,186	25–5

Color： Win Lose
Schedule

== Playoffs ==
=== Game log ===
2023 playoffs game log
Total: 7–0 (home: 4–0; road: 3–0)
Semifinals : 3–0 (home: 2–0; road: 1–0)

Game	Date	Team	Score	High points	High rebounds	High assists	Location Attendance	Series
1	May 1	Suns	W 126–78	Nick King (27)	Edgaras Želionis (14)	Lin Wei-Han (13)	Xinzhuang Gymnasium; 3,253	1–0
2	May 4	@ Suns	W 110–83	Nick King (18)	Kristijan Krajina (8)	Hsieh Ya-Hsuan (6); Lin Ping-Sheng (6)	National Taiwan University of Sport Gymnasium; 1,333	2–0
3	May 7	Suns	W 130–86	Mohammad Al Bachir Gadiaga (27)	Kristijan Krajina (12); Nick King (12)	Lin Wei-Han (5)	Xinzhuang Gymnasium; 3,345	3–0

Finals : 4–0 (home: 2–0; road: 2–0)

Game	Date	Team	Score	High points	High rebounds	High assists	Location Attendance	Series
1	May 13	GhostHawks	W 117–110	Kristijan Krajina (25)	Kristijan Krajina (14)	Lin Wei-Han (12)	Xinzhuang Gymnasium; 4,059	1–0
2	May 15	GhostHawks	W 108–98	Kristijan Krajina (24)	Nick King (12)	Lin Wei-Han (11)	Xinzhuang Gymnasium; 3,622	2–0
3	May 19	@ GhostHawks	W 112–96	Nick King (26)	Edgaras Želionis (13)	Lin Wei-Han (7)	Chia Nan University of Pharmacy and Science Shao Tsung Gymnasium; 2,065	3–0
4	May 21	@ GhostHawks	W 120–93	Edgaras Želionis (35)	Edgaras Želionis (9)	Lin Wei-Han (12)	Chia Nan University of Pharmacy and Science Shao Tsung Gymnasium; 2,065	4–0

Color： Win Lose
Schedule

== Player statistics ==
Legend
GP	Games played	MPG	Minutes per game	FG%	Field goal percentage
3P%	3-point field goal percentage	FT%	Free throw percentage	RPG	Rebounds per game
APG	Assists per game	SPG	Steals per game	BPG	Blocks per game
PPG	Points per game		Led the league		Finals MVP

=== Regular season ===
Player	GP	MPG	PPG	FG%	3P%	FT%	RPG	APG	SPG	BPG
Mohammad Al Bachir Gadiaga	30	36:12	18.9	41.6%	32.1%	67.1%	5.7	2.4	1.4	0.7
Edgaras Želionis	21	29:32	17.6	59.1%	37.0%	77.1%	10.2	2.4	1.2	0.8
Liu Jen-Hao	3	7:49	1.7	40.0%	25.0%	0.0%	1.0	1.0	0.3	0.0
Lin Ping-Sheng	30	25:41	7.8	33.7%	25.8%	75.9%	3.6	3.6	2.1	0.0
Liu Min-Yan	1	4:50	2.0	0.0%	0.0%	100.0%	1.0	0.0	0.0	0.0
Demitrius Conger^{≠‡}	7	21:22	13.6	45.8%	12.5%	77.3%	7.1	1.6	0.7	0.0
Lee Hsueh-Lin	4	9:33	0.5	100.0%	0.0%	0.0%	1.5	1.3	0.5	0.0
Wei Chia-Hao	27	14:28	2.7	36.8%	32.7%	50.0%	1.4	2.6	1.4	0.0
Tung Fang Yi-Kang	3	9:53	5.0	30.0%	18.8%	0.0%	3.3	0.0	0.3	0.0
Kristijan Krajina	26	32:47	15.5	57.0%	47.2%	66.7%	9.4	1.6	0.6	0.5
Hsieh Ya-Hsuan	27	28:46	13.2	46.7%	44.6%	86.4%	3.5	2.8	1.5	0.1
Zhou Cheng-Rui	4	4:29	0.0	0.0%	0.0%	0.0%	0.5	0.0	0.0	0.0
Jonah Morrison	21	8:06	1.6	26.7%	28.1%	50.0%	0.8	0.2	0.1	0.0
Chen Yu-An	Did not play									
Kaspars Bērziņš^{≠}	13	22:37	8.7	38.5%	35.8%	50.0%	6.9	1.4	0.6	0.9
Lin Wei-Han	18	39:46	12.9	36.2%	36.4%	64.7%	6.2	10.0	2.9	0.0
Liu Weir-Chern	9	4:59	0.7	14.3%	0.0%	66.7%	0.9	0.3	0.0	0.0
Jure Gunjina^{‡}	7	17:09	4.3	30.0%	26.3%	50.0%	2.3	1.9	0.6	0.1
Nick King^{≠}	16	33:07	25.8	49.7%	29.7%	69.7%	7.6	4.4	1.7	0.1
Tseng Wen-Ting	27	21:46	4.0	40.8%	33.3%	46.2%	2.9	2.3	0.4	0.7

^{‡} Left during the season
^{≠} Acquired during the season

=== Semifinals ===
Player	GP	MPG	PPG	FG%	3P%	FT%	RPG	APG	SPG	BPG
Mohammad Al Bachir Gadiaga	3	29:13	18.0	45.8%	25.0%	66.7%	4.7	2.3	3.0	0.0
Edgaras Želionis	2	22:23	17.5	76.5%	40.0%	70.0%	10.0	2.5	1.5	0.0
Liu Jen-Hao	2	4:07	1.5	100.0%	100.0%	0.0%	0.0	1.0	1.0	0.0
Lin Ping-Sheng	3	23:06	12.7	53.6%	44.4%	0.0%	4.7	4.3	1.7	0.0
Liu Min-Yan	Did not play									
Lee Hsueh-Lin	Did not play									
Wei Chia-Hao	3	16:24	4.0	50.0%	40.0%	0.0%	1.3	3.0	1.0	0.0
Tung Fang Yi-Kang	Did not play									
Kristijan Krajina	3	29:24	14.3	55.9%	25.0%	100.0%	10.7	1.7	1.0	0.3
Hsieh Ya-Hsuan	3	27:39	12.7	44.0%	47.1%	100.0%	4.0	4.0	1.7	0.3
Zhou Cheng-Rui	1	4:24	0.0	0.0%	0.0%	0.0%	0.0	0.0	0.0	0.0
Jonah Morrison	3	13:04	6.0	66.7%	75.0%	0.0%	1.3	1.0	0.3	0.0
Chen Yu-An	Did not play									
Kaspars Bērziņš	1	28:19	20.0	77.8%	83.3%	25.0%	8.0	1.0	0.0	0.0
Lin Wei-Han	3	21:11	8.3	40.9%	35.7%	100.0%	5.0	7.3	1.7	0.0
Liu Weir-Chern	3	7:07	2.7	28.6%	50.0%	100.0%	0.3	0.3	0.3	0.0
Nick King	3	29:05	21.7	58.1%	60.0%	64.3%	8.3	4.3	1.0	0.0
Tseng Wen-Ting	3	15:08	2.3	30.0%	0.0%	50.0%	2.3	1.3	0.3	0.3

=== Finals ===
Player	GP	MPG	PPG	FG%	3P%	FT%	RPG	APG	SPG	BPG
Mohammad Al Bachir Gadiaga	4	38:12	18.8	50.8%	38.5%	75.0%	7.0	2.5	1.5	0.3
Edgaras Želionis	4	30:43	24.0	60.7%	57.1%	80.0%	9.8	1.0	1.3	0.5
Liu Jen-Hao	Did not play									
Lin Ping-Sheng	4	20:02	9.0	52.0%	50.0%	50.0%	1.5	3.0	1.5	0.0
Liu Min-Yan	Did not play									
Lee Hsueh-Lin	Did not play									
Wei Chia-Hao	3	12:06	0.0	0.0%	0.0%	0.0%	1.7	0.7	0.7	0.0
Tung Fang Yi-Kang	Did not play									
Kristijan Krajina	4	33:09	18.5	63.5%	45.5%	60.0%	7.8	3.0	0.8	0.3
Hsieh Ya-Hsuan	4	21:39	6.0	47.4%	27.3%	60.0%	1.5	1.0	1.5	0.5
Zhou Cheng-Rui	Did not play									
Jonah Morrison	2	1:33	0.0	0.0%	0.0%	0.0%	0.0	0.0	0.0	0.0
Chen Yu-An	Did not play									
Kaspars Bērziņš	Did not play									
Lin Wei-Han	4	31:12	14.0	48.6%	50.0%	87.5%	4.0	10.5	2.3	0.0
Liu Weir-Chern	1	4:24	0.0	0.0%	0.0%	0.0%	0.0	0.0	0.0	0.0
Nick King	4	29:23	17.0	41.4%	20.0%	36.8%	8.0	4.8	1.8	0.3
Tseng Wen-Ting	4	24:39	7.0	52.6%	46.2%	100.0%	2.0	4.8	0.5	1.3

- Reference：

== Transactions ==
=== Overview ===
Players added

Via draft

- Chen Yu-An

Via free agency

- Kaspars Bērziņš
- Demitrius Conger
- Jure Gunjina
- Nick King
- Kristijan Krajina
- Liu Jen-Hao
- Tseng Wen-Ting
- Edgaras Želionis
Players lost

Via free agency

- Kevin Allen
- Aaron Epps
- Marlon Johnson
- Avery Scharer

Waived

- Demitrius Conger
- Jure Gunjina

=== Trades ===
Date	Trade		Ref.
July 11, 2022	To New Taipei CTBC DEA: Cash considerations	To Kaohsiung Aquas: 2022 DEA's first-round pick	

=== Free agency ===
==== Additions ====
Date	Player	Contract terms	Former team	Ref.
August 23, 2022	Chen Yu-An	—N/a	(Taiwan) UT	
September 13, 2022	Edgaras Želionis	—N/a	(Lithuania) Neptūnas Klaipėda	
September 16, 2022	Jure Gunjina	—N/a	(Croatia) KK Zabok	
September 22, 2022	Kristijan Krajina	—N/a	(Poland) GTK Gliwice	
September 30, 2022	Tseng Wen-Ting	3-year contract, worth unknown	(Taiwan) Taipei Fubon Braves	
October 4, 2022	Liu Jen-Hao	1-year contract, worth unknown	(China) Foshan Gongfuxiaozi	
December 15, 2022	Demitrius Conger	—N/a	(Belgium) B.C. Oostende	
January 30, 2023	Nick King	—N/a	(United States) Windy City Bulls	
February 21, 2023	Kaspars Bērziņš	—N/a	(France) SIG Strasbourg	

==== Subtractions ====
Date	Player	Reason	New team	Ref.
March 23, 2022	Marlon Johnson	Contract expired	(Canada) Edmonton Stingers	
June 26, 2022	Avery Scharer	Contract expired	(Thailand) Khon Kaen Raptors	
August 5, 2022	Kevin Allen	Contract expired	(Spain) Real Valladolid Baloncesto	
October 11, 2022	Aaron Epps	Contract expired	(Canada) Raptors 905	
December 16, 2022	Jure Gunjina	Contract terminated	(Croatia) KK Gorica	
February 21, 2023	Demitrius Conger	Contract terminated	(Romania) Rapid București	

== Awards ==
=== Yearly awards ===
Recipient	Award	Ref.
Mohammad Al Bachir Gadiaga	Most Popular Player of the Year	
Mohammad Al Bachir Gadiaga	All-T1 League First Team	
Mohammad Al Bachir Gadiaga	Most Valuable Player	
Lin Wei-Han	Assists Leader	
Lin Wei-Han	Steals Leader	
Lin Wei-Han	Defensive Player of the Year	
Lin Wei-Han	All-Defensive First Team	
Lin Wei-Han	All-T1 League First Team	
New Taipei CTBC DEA	Best Home-Court of the Year	
Liu Chih-Wei	General Manager of the Year	
Lee Yi-Hua	Coach of the Year	
Lin Ping-Sheng	All-Defensive First Team	
Hsieh Ya-Hsuan	Most Improved Player	

=== Finals awards ===
Recipient	Award	Ref.
New Taipei CTBC DEA	Champion	
Lin Wei-Han	Finals MVP	

=== All-Star Game awards ===
Recipient	Award	Ref.
Mohammad Al Bachir Gadiaga	All-Star Game Most Famous Player	

=== MVP of the Month ===
Month	Recipient	Award	Ref.
November	Mohammad Al Bachir Gadiaga	November MVP of the Month	
December	Lin Wei-Han	December MVP of the Month	
January	Hsieh Ya-Hsuan	January MVP of the Month	
February	Hsieh Ya-Hsuan	February MVP of the Month	
March	Lin Wei-Han	March MVP of the Month	

=== Import of the Month ===
Month	Recipient	Award	Ref.
December	Edgaras Želionis	December Import of the Month	
March	Edgaras Želionis	March Import of the Month	
