= 2023 T1 League finals =

Taiwanese basketball championship

Team	Coach	Wins
New Taipei CTBC DEA	Lee Yi-Hua	4
Tainan TSG GhostHawks	Liu Meng-Chu	0
- Dates: May 13 – 21, 2023
- MVP: Lin Wei-Han (New Taipei CTBC DEA)

The 2023 T1 League finals was the championship series of the T1 League's 2022–23 season and conclusion of the season's playoffs. The best-of-seven final series was played by the winners of the semifinals series. The finals series started on May 13 and ended on May 21. The series was matched by New Taipei CTBC DEA and Tainan TSG GhostHawks. On May 21, the New Taipei CTBC DEA defeated the Tainan TSG GhostHawks, 4–0, winning the 2022–23 season championship. Lin Wei-Han of the New Taipei CTBC DEA was named the Finals MVP.

== Bracket ==
Play-in
4	TaiwanBeer HeroBears	1
5	**Taichung Suns**	**2**

Semifinals
1	**New Taipei CTBC DEA**	**3**
5	Taichung Suns	0
2	**Tainan TSG GhostHawks**	**3**
3	Kaohsiung Aquas	2

Finals
1	**New Taipei CTBC DEA**	**4**
2	Tainan TSG GhostHawks	0

Bold: Series winner
Italic: Team with home-court advantage

== Background ==
=== Road to the finals ===
New Taipei CTBC DEA (1st seed)		Tainan TSG GhostHawks (2nd seed)
Team / GP / W / L / PCT / GB; **New Taipei CTBC DEA** / 30 / 25 / 5 / .833 / —; Tainan TSG GhostHawks / 30 / 19 / 11 / .633 / 6; Kaohsiung Aquas / 30 / 16 / 14 / .533 / 9; TaiwanBeer HeroBears / 30 / 16 / 14 / .533 / 9; Taichung Suns / 30 / 8 / 22 / .267 / 17; Taoyuan Leopards / 30 / 6 / 24 / .200 / 19	Regular season	Team / GP / W / L / PCT / GB; New Taipei CTBC DEA / 30 / 25 / 5 / .833 / —; **Tainan TSG GhostHawks** / 30 / 19 / 11 / .633 / 6; Kaohsiung Aquas / 30 / 16 / 14 / .533 / 9; TaiwanBeer HeroBears / 30 / 16 / 14 / .533 / 9; Taichung Suns / 30 / 8 / 22 / .267 / 17; Taoyuan Leopards / 30 / 6 / 24 / .200 / 19
No need to play play-in series	Play-in	No need to play play-in series
Defeated the 5th seed Taichung Suns, 3–0	Semifinals	Defeated the 3rd seed Kaohsiung Aquas, 3–2

=== Regular season series ===
The DEA won 6–0 in the regular-season series.

October 30, 2022

boxscore

Tainan TSG GhostHawks	98–**101**	**New Taipei CTBC DEA**

Xinzhuang Gymnasium, New Taipei City

November 12, 2022

boxscore

**New Taipei CTBC DEA**	**107**–104	Tainan TSG GhostHawks

Chia Nan University of Pharmacy and Science Shao Tsung Gymnasium, Tainan City

December 18, 2022

boxscore

Tainan TSG GhostHawks	93–**101**	**New Taipei CTBC DEA**

Xinzhuang Gymnasium, New Taipei City

January 14, 2023

boxscore

**New Taipei CTBC DEA**	**116**–111	Tainan TSG GhostHawks

Chia Nan University of Pharmacy and Science Shao Tsung Gymnasium, Tainan City

April 16, 2023

boxscore

**New Taipei CTBC DEA**	**114**–105	Tainan TSG GhostHawks

Chia Nan University of Pharmacy and Science Shao Tsung Gymnasium, Tainan City

April 22, 2023

boxscore

Tainan TSG GhostHawks	102–**114**	**New Taipei CTBC DEA**

Xinzhuang Gymnasium, New Taipei City

== Series summary ==
Game	Date	Away team	Result	Home team
Game 1	May 13	Tainan TSG GhostHawks	110–**117** (0–1)	**New Taipei CTBC DEA**
Game 2	May 15	Tainan TSG GhostHawks	98–**108** (0–2)	**New Taipei CTBC DEA**
Game 3	May 19	**New Taipei CTBC DEA**	**112**–96 (3–0)	Tainan TSG GhostHawks
Game 4	May 21	**New Taipei CTBC DEA**	**120**–93 (4–0)	Tainan TSG GhostHawks

== Game summaries ==
=== Game 1 ===
Eleven Sports
ELTA TV

May 13, 2023
14:00 (UTC+8)

boxscore

Tainan TSG GhostHawks	110–**117**	**New Taipei CTBC DEA**
Scoring by quarter: 25–**30**, 25–**30**, 28–**29**, **32**–28
Pts: Upshaw 23; Rebs: Upshaw 17; Asts: Ku Mao Wei-Chia 9		Pts: Krajina 25; Rebs: Krajina 14; Asts: Lin Wei-Han 12
**DEA leads series, 1–0**

Xinzhuang Gymnasium, New Taipei City
Attendance: 4,059
Referees: Yu Jung, Glenn Cornelio, Hsieh Shang-Chien

=== Game 2 ===
Eleven Sports
ELTA TV

May 15, 2023
19:00 (UTC+8)

boxscore

Tainan TSG GhostHawks	98–**108**	**New Taipei CTBC DEA**
Scoring by quarter: **28**–23, 30–**34**, **27**–23, 13–**28**
Pts: Bhullar 22; Rebs: Bhullar 18; Asts: Hu Kai-Hsiang 5		Pts: Krajina 24; Rebs: King 12; Asts: Lin Wei-Han 11
**DEA leads series, 2–0**

Xinzhuang Gymnasium, New Taipei City
Attendance: 3,622
Referees: Lin Chien-Hung, Lan Wei-Hsiung, Lai Chien-Hao

=== Game 3 ===
VL Sports
ELTA TV

May 19, 2023
19:00 (UTC+8)

boxscore

**New Taipei CTBC DEA**	**112**–96	Tainan TSG GhostHawks
Scoring by quarter: **38**–29, **28**–23, **29**–18, 17–**26**
Pts: King 26; Rebs: Želionis 13; Asts: Lin Wei-Han 7		Pts: Upshaw, Weathers 18; Rebs: Weathers 14; Asts: Upshaw 5
**DEA leads series, 3–0**

Chia Nan University of Pharmacy and Science Shao Tsung Gymnasium, Tainan City
Attendance: 2,065
Referees: Yu Jung, Chan Owe Shiong, Chen Chien-Lin

=== Game 4 ===
VL Sports
ELTA TV

May 21, 2023
14:00 (UTC+8)

boxscore

**New Taipei CTBC DEA**	**120**–93	Tainan TSG GhostHawks
Scoring by quarter: **31**–26, 29–**32**, **36**–15, **24**–20
Pts: Želionis 35; Rebs: Želionis 9 Asts: Lin Wei-Han 12		Pts: Upshaw 20; Rebs: Bhullar 14; Asts: Ku Mao Wei-Chia 9
**DEA wins T1 League finals, 4–0**

Chia Nan University of Pharmacy and Science Shao Tsung Gymnasium, Tainan City
Attendance: 2,065
Referees: Chan Owe Shiong, Lin Chien-Hung, Joenard Garcia

== Rosters ==
=== New Taipei CTBC DEA ===
2022–23 New Taipei CTBC DEA roster
Players
Coaches

Pos.	No.	Nat.	Name	Ht.	Wt.	Age	From
SF	0	(Taiwan)	Mohammad Al Bachir Gadiaga	1.89 m (6 ft 2 in)	92 kg (203 lb)	25 – 27 April 1998	SHU
C	1	(Lithuania)	Edgaras Želionis **(I)**	2.07 m (6 ft 9 in)	97 kg (214 lb)	33 – 4 June 1989	Lithuania
PG	2	(Taiwan)	Liu Jen-Hao	1.75 m (5 ft 9 in)	69 kg (152 lb)	27 – 10 November 1995	UCH
SG	3	(Taiwan)	Lin Ping-Sheng	1.86 m (6 ft 1 in)	80 kg (176 lb)	26 – 26 December 1996	CCU
PF	4	(Taiwan)	Liu Min-Yan	1.95 m (6 ft 5 in)	85 kg (187 lb)	23 – 4 December 1999	NKNU
PG	6	(Taiwan)	Lee Hsueh-Lin **(C)**	1.75 m (5 ft 9 in)	81 kg (179 lb)	39 – 31 January 1984	TPEC
PG	7	(Taiwan)	Wei Chia-Hao	1.82 m (6 ft 0 in)	78 kg (172 lb)	23 – 13 January 2000	FJU
SG	8	(Taiwan)	Tung Fang Yi-Kang	1.81 m (5 ft 11 in)	81 kg (179 lb)	25 – 12 October 1997	NYCU
C	9	(Croatia)	Kristijan Krajina **(I)**	2.08 m (6 ft 10 in)	111 kg (245 lb)	32 – 28 December 1990	Mount St. Mary's
SG	10	(Taiwan)	Hsieh Ya-Hsuan	1.87 m (6 ft 2 in)	81 kg (179 lb)	24 – 30 October 1998	UCH
PF	11	(Taiwan)	Zhou Cheng-Rui	1.93 m (6 ft 4 in)	82 kg (181 lb)	23 – 24 February 2000	CCU
PF	12	(Taiwan) (United Kingdom)	Jonah Morrison	2.03 m (6 ft 8 in)	105 kg (231 lb)	22 – 2 June 2000	UBC
PF	13	(Taiwan)	Chen Yu-An	1.92 m (6 ft 4 in)	88 kg (194 lb)	22 – 26 May 2000	UT
C	14	(Latvia)	Kaspars Bērziņš **(I)**	2.13 m (7 ft 0 in)	102 kg (225 lb)	37 – 25 August 1985	Latvia
PG	16	(Taiwan)	Lin Wei-Han	1.78 m (5 ft 10 in)	71 kg (157 lb)	32 – 9 July 1990	FJU
SF	30	(Taiwan)	Liu Weir-Chern	1.90 m (6 ft 3 in)	84 kg (185 lb)	34 – 27 November 1988	MDU
F	55	(United States)	Nick King **(I)**	2.03 m (6 ft 8 in)	102 kg (225 lb)	27 – 5 August 1995	Middle Tennessee
C	76	(Taiwan)	Tseng Wen-Ting	2.04 m (6 ft 8 in)	98 kg (216 lb)	38 – 6 July 1984	TPEC

Head coach

- (Taiwan) Lee Yi-Hua

Assistant coach(es)

- (Serbia) Momir Ratkovic

Strength & conditioning coach(es)

- (Taiwan) Mu Chien-Hung

Athletic trainer(s)

- (Taiwan) Li Kuo-Yi
- (Taiwan) Fan Hsiang-Yu

Team manager

- (Taiwan) Liu Chih-Wei

Legend

- **(C)** Team captain
- **(I)** Import player
- Injured

- Roster
Updated: February 21, 2023

=== Tainan TSG GhostHawks ===
2022–23 Tainan TSG GhostHawks roster
Players
Coaches

Pos.	No.	Nat.	Name	Ht.	Wt.	Age	From
SF	0	(Taiwan)	Chang Wei-Hsiang	1.90 m (6 ft 3 in)	90 kg (198 lb)	27 – 15 May 1996	NTUA
SG	2	(Taiwan)	Chien Wei-Ju	1.86 m (6 ft 1 in)	85 kg (187 lb)	31 – 20 January 1992	NTNU
PG	3	(Taiwan)	Ku Mao Wei-Chia	1.75 m (5 ft 9 in)	68 kg (150 lb)	23 – 4 December 1999	UCH
PG	4	(Taiwan)	Li Han-Sheng	1.77 m (5 ft 10 in)	76 kg (168 lb)	28 – 24 October 1994	NTNU
SF	6	(Taiwan)	Liu Chun-Ting	1.87 m (6 ft 2 in)	75 kg (165 lb)	24 – 31 March 1999	UCH
G	9	(Taiwan)	Wu Yen-Lun	1.82 m (6 ft 0 in)	72 kg (159 lb)	25 – 18 June 1997	ISU
F	10	(Taiwan)	Tsai Chien-Yu	1.87 m (6 ft 2 in)	95 kg (209 lb)	26 – 19 September 1996	CKU
PF	12	(Taiwan)	Hu Kai-Hsiang	1.90 m (6 ft 3 in)	93 kg (205 lb)	32 – 16 May 1991	CCU
C	13	(Malta) (Italy)	Samuel Deguara **(I)**	2.30 m (7 ft 7 in)	116 kg (256 lb)	31 – 21 June 1991	FIU
SG	16	(Taiwan)	Lin Tzu-Feng	1.84 m (6 ft 0 in)	85 kg (187 lb)	24 – 30 October 1998	UCH
C	18	(Taiwan)	Wu Hung-Hsing	2.02 m (6 ft 8 in)	96 kg (212 lb)	33 – 21 October 1989	SRHS
PF	21	(Taiwan)	Lu Kuan-Ting	1.97 m (6 ft 6 in)	100 kg (220 lb)	30 – 13 October 1992	NTUA
SF	23	(Taiwan)	Chen Ching-Huan	1.90 m (6 ft 3 in)	84 kg (185 lb)	37 – 3 February 1986	FJU
PF	29	(Taiwan)	Han Chieh-Yu	1.94 m (6 ft 4 in)	95 kg (209 lb)	23 – 17 December 1999	NTSU
C	35	(Canada)	Sim Bhullar **(I)**	2.26 m (7 ft 5 in)	140 kg (309 lb)	30 – 2 December 1992	New Mexico State
SF	50	(United States)	Marcus Weathers **(I)**	1.96 m (6 ft 5 in)	98 kg (216 lb)	25 – 5 August 1997	SMU
C	54	(Taiwan)	Wu Tai-Hao **(C)**	2.03 m (6 ft 8 in)	108 kg (238 lb)	38 – 7 February 1985	BYU-Hawaii
C	55	(United States)	Robert Upshaw **(I)**	2.13 m (7 ft 0 in)	113 kg (249 lb)	29 – 5 January 1994	Washington

Head coach

- (Taiwan) Liu Meng-Chu

Assistant coach(es)

- (Taiwan) Ma I-Hung

Strength & conditioning coach(es)

- (Taiwan) Kuo Han-Po

Athletic trainer(s)

- (Taiwan) Lin Te-Min

Physiotherapist(s)

- (Taiwan) Kuei Shan-Yu

Team manager

- (Taiwan) Chien Wei-Cheng

Legend

- **(C)** Team captain
- **(I)** Import player
- Injured

- Roster
Updated: March 25, 2023

== Player statistics ==
Legend
GP	Games played	MPG	Minutes per game	FG%	Field goal percentage
3P%	3-point field goal percentage	FT%	Free throw percentage	RPG	Rebounds per game
APG	Assists per game	SPG	Steals per game	BPG	Blocks per game
PPG	Points per game		Finals MVP

=== New Taipei CTBC DEA ===
Player	GP	MPG	PPG	FG%	3P%	FT%	RPG	APG	SPG	BPG
Mohammad Al Bachir Gadiaga	4	38:12	18.8	50.8%	38.5%	75.0%	7.0	2.5	1.5	0.3
Edgaras Želionis	4	30:43	24.0	60.7%	57.1%	80.0%	9.8	1.0	1.3	0.5
Liu Jen-Hao	Did not play									
Lin Ping-Sheng	4	20:02	9.0	52.0%	50.0%	50.0%	1.5	3.0	1.5	0.0
Liu Min-Yan	Did not play									
Lee Hsueh-Lin	Did not play									
Wei Chia-Hao	3	12:06	0.0	0.0%	0.0%	0.0%	1.7	0.7	0.7	0.0
Tung Fang Yi-Kang	Did not play									
Kristijan Krajina	4	33:09	18.5	63.5%	45.5%	60.0%	7.8	3.0	0.8	0.3
Hsieh Ya-Hsuan	4	21:39	6.0	47.4%	27.3%	60.0%	1.5	1.0	1.5	0.5
Zhou Cheng-Rui	Did not play									
Jonah Morrison	2	1:33	0.0	0.0%	0.0%	0.0%	0.0	0.0	0.0	0.0
Chen Yu-An	Did not play									
Kaspars Bērziņš	Did not play									
Lin Wei-Han	4	31:12	14.0	48.6%	50.0%	87.5%	4.0	10.5	2.3	0.0
Liu Weir-Chern	1	4:24	0.0	0.0%	0.0%	0.0%	0.0	0.0	0.0	0.0
Nick King	4	29:23	17.0	41.4%	20.0%	36.8%	8.0	4.8	1.8	0.3
Tseng Wen-Ting	4	24:39	7.0	52.6%	46.2%	100.0%	2.0	4.8	0.5	1.3

=== Tainan TSG GhostHawks ===
Player	GP	MPG	PPG	FG%	3P%	FT%	RPG	APG	SPG	BPG
Chang Wei-Hsiang	Did not play									
Chien Wei-Ju	4	27:58	9.0	34.1%	30.4%	50.0%	3.3	2.0	0.5	0.0
Ku Mao Wei-Chia	4	27:43	12.3	36.2%	28.6%	69.2%	3.3	6.5	1.0	0.0
Li Han-Sheng	4	18:58	4.0	31.6%	25.0%	0.0%	2.3	4.0	0.5	0.0
Liu Chun-Ting	Did not play									
Wu Yen-Lun	1	5:32	0.0	0.0%	0.0%	0.0%	1.0	0.0	0.0	0.0
Tsai Chien-Yu	Did not play									
Hu Kai-Hsiang	4	25:25	9.5	38.5%	32.0%	0.0%	2.0	3.3	1.3	0.0
Samuel Deguara	3	29:46	18.3	66.7%	0.0%	78.6%	11.7	1.3	0.7	0.0
Lin Tzu-Feng	Did not play									
Wu Hung-Hsing	3	2:52	2.7	66.7%	0.0%	0.0%	0.3	0.0	0.0	0.0
Lu Kuan-Ting	2	6:45	3.0	40.0%	40.0%	0.0%	0.0	0.5	0.0	0.0
Chen Ching-Huan	4	13:46	0.0	0.0%	0.0%	0.0%	0.3	1.0	0.0	0.0
Han Chieh-Yu	4	17:58	7.3	34.4%	25.0%	100.0%	3.3	0.3	0.8	0.0
Sim Bhullar	3	34:47	16.0	66.7%	0.0%	54.1%	13.7	1.7	0.3	1.0
Marcus Weathers	3	25:30	16.3	42.5%	10.0%	77.8%	7.7	1.3	1.0	0.7
Wu Tai-Hao	3	7:41	0.7	33.3%	0.0%	0.0%	1.3	0.3	0.0	0.0
Robert Upshaw	3	37:15	20.3	38.8%	35.7%	72.2%	11.0	4.3	1.0	1.7

- Reference：
