= 2023 T1 League playoffs =

Taiwanese basketball tournament

Tournament details
- Dates: April 25 – May 21, 2023
- Season: 2022–23
- Teams: 5

Final positions
- Champions: New Taipei CTBC DEA (1st title)
- Runners-up: Tainan TSG GhostHawks
- Semifinalists: Kaohsiung Aquas; Taichung Suns

The 2023 T1 League playoffs was the postseason tournament of the T1 League's 2022–23 season. The play-in series started on April 25 and ended on April 27. The semifinals series started on April 28 and ended on May 8. The finals series started on May 13 and ended on May 21. On May 21, the New Taipei CTBC DEA defeated the Tainan TSG GhostHawks, 4–0, winning the 2022–23 season championship.

== Format ==
Five teams participated in the playoffs. The top three teams, based on winning percentage of regular season, directly qualified for the semifinals. The fourth and fifth seeds played the best-of-three play-in series, which was in a 1-1 format. The fourth seed was awarded a one-win advantage. The winner of the play-in series and the top three seeds played the best-of-five semifinals series, which was in a 2-2-1 format. The winners of the semifinals series played the best-of-seven finals series, which was in a 2-2-1-1-1 format. Due to the schedule of the Xinzhuang Gymnasium, the semifinals series between the New Taipei CTBC DEA and the winner of play-in series changed to a 1-1-1-1-1 format.

== Playoff qualifying ==
On March 19, 2023, the New Taipei CTBC DEA became the first team to clinch the semifinals series. On April 3, the New Taipei CTBC DEA clinched the regular season title. On April 9, the Taichung Suns became the first team to qualify the play-in series. On April 16, the Kaohsiung Aquas became the final team to secure a direct berth in the semifinals bracket, qualifying as the third seed and relegating the TaiwanBeer HeroBears to the play-in series. On April 27, the Taichung Suns won the play-in series and advanced to the semifinals bracket.

Seed	Team	Record	Clinched		
Seed	Team	Record	Play-in berth	Semifinals berth	Best record in T1
1	New Taipei CTBC DEA	25–5	—	March 19	April 3
2	Tainan TSG GhostHawks	19–11	—	April 1	—
3	Kaohsiung Aquas	16–14	—	April 16	—
4	TaiwanBeer HeroBears	16–14	April 16	—	—
5	Taichung Suns	8–22	April 9	April 27	—

== Bracket ==
Play-in
4	TaiwanBeer HeroBears	1
5	**Taichung Suns**	**2**

Semifinals
1	**New Taipei CTBC DEA**	**3**
5	Taichung Suns	0
2	**Tainan TSG GhostHawks**	**3**
3	Kaohsiung Aquas	2

Finals
1	**New Taipei CTBC DEA**	**4**
2	Tainan TSG GhostHawks	0

Bold: Series winner
Italic: Team with home-court advantage

== Play-in: (4) TaiwanBeer HeroBears vs. (5) Taichung Suns ==
Eleven Sports
ELTA TV

April 25, 2023
19:00 (UTC+8)

boxscore

TaiwanBeer HeroBears	130–**138** (2OT)	**Taichung Suns**
Scoring by quarter: **36**–24, **35**–27, 18–**37**, 26–**27**, Overtime: 15–**23**
Pts: Qualls 37; Rebs: Thabeet 25; Asts: Chiang Yu-An 14		Pts: Rice 44; Rebs: Rice 12; Asts: Rice 11
**Series tied, 1–1**

National Taiwan University of Sport Gymnasium, Taichung City
Attendance: 847
Referees: Lai Chien-Hao, Glenn Cornelio, Chan Owe Shiong

VL Sports
ELTA TV

April 27, 2023
19:00 (UTC+8)

boxscore

**Taichung Suns**	**120**–118	TaiwanBeer HeroBears
Scoring by quarter: **32**–29, **28**–26, 29–**36**, **31**–27
Pts: Rice 46; Rebs: Moultrie 15; Asts: Ting Sheng-Ju 8		Pts: Jones 33; Rebs: Jones 13; Asts: Jones, Chiang Yu-An 8
**Suns wins series, 2–1**

University of Taipei Tianmu Campus Gymnasium, Taipei City
Attendance: 991
Referees: Ho Chang-Jen, Chan Owe Shiong, Hsieh Shang-Chien

Regular-season series
The HeroBears won 5–1 in the regular-season series

November 13, 2022

boxscore

Taichung Suns	94–**109**	**TaiwanBeer HeroBears**

University of Taipei Tianmu Campus Gymnasium, Taipei City

December 17, 2022

boxscore

**TaiwanBeer HeroBears**	**92**–80	Taichung Suns

National Taiwan University of Sport Gymnasium, Taichung City

January 7, 2023

boxscore

Taichung Suns	89–**105**	**TaiwanBeer HeroBears**

University of Taipei Tianmu Campus Gymnasium, Taipei City

February 11, 2023

boxscore

**Taichung Suns**	**95**–90	TaiwanBeer HeroBears

University of Taipei Tianmu Campus Gymnasium, Taipei City

February 27, 2023

boxscore

**TaiwanBeer HeroBears**	**97**–91	Taichung Suns

National Taiwan University of Sport Gymnasium, Taichung City

April 15, 2023

boxscore

**TaiwanBeer HeroBears**	**98**–95	Taichung Suns

National Taiwan University of Sport Gymnasium, Taichung City

This was the first playoff meeting between these two teams.

== Semifinals ==
=== (1) New Taipei CTBC DEA vs. (5) Taichung Suns ===
Eleven Sports
ELTA TV

May 1, 2023
19:00 (UTC+8)

boxscore

Taichung Suns	78–**126**	**New Taipei CTBC DEA**
Scoring by quarter: 19–**37**, 20–**31**, 16–**30**, 23–**28**
Pts: Rice 13; Rebs: Moultrie 17; Asts: Lin Ming-Yi 4		Pts: King 27; Rebs: Želionis 14; Asts: Lin Wei-Han 13
**DEA leads series, 1–0**

Xinzhuang Gymnasium, New Taipei City
Attendance: 3,253
Referees: Yu Jung, Chan Owe Shiong, Glenn Cornelio

Eleven Sports
ELTA TV

May 4, 2023
19:00 (UTC+8)

boxscore

**New Taipei CTBC DEA**	**110**–83	Taichung Suns
Scoring by quarter: **37**–14, 28–**33**, **21**–17, **24**–19
Pts: King 18; Rebs: Krajina 8 Asts: Hsieh Ya-Hsuan, Lin Ping-Sheng 6		Pts: Rice 21; Rebs: Moultrie, Benson 10; Asts: Ting Sheng-Ju 11
**DEA leads series, 2–0**

National Taiwan University of Sport Gymnasium, Taichung City
Attendance: 1,333
Referees: Glenn Cornelio, Chan Owe Shiong, Chen Chien-Lin

Eleven Sports
ELTA TV

May 7, 2023
14:00 (UTC+8)

boxscore

Taichung Suns	86–**130**	**New Taipei CTBC DEA**
Scoring by quarter: **28**–25, 25–**30**, 17–**36**, 16–**39**
Pts: Rice 20; Rebs: Benson 12; Asts: Ting Sheng-Ju 8		Pts: Bachir 27; Rebs: Krajina, King 12; Asts: Lin Wei-Han 5
**DEA wins series, 3–0**

Xinzhuang Gymnasium, New Taipei City
Attendance: 3,345
Referees: Lin Chien-Hung, Glenn Cornelio, Lan Wei-Hsiung

Regular-season series
The DEA won 5–1 in the regular-season series

November 6, 2022

boxscore

New Taipei CTBC DEA	109–**112**	**Taichung Suns**

National Taiwan University of Sport Gymnasium, Taichung City

February 4, 2023

boxscore

**New Taipei CTBC DEA**	**110**–100	Taichung Suns

National Taiwan University of Sport Gymnasium, Taichung City

March 4, 2023

boxscore

Taichung Suns	88–**96**	**New Taipei CTBC DEA**

Xinzhuang Gymnasium, New Taipei City

March 19, 2023

boxscore

**New Taipei CTBC DEA**	**97**–82	Taichung Suns

National Taiwan University of Sport Gymnasium, Taichung City

March 26, 2023

boxscore

Taichung Suns	93–**112**	**New Taipei CTBC DEA**

Xinzhuang Gymnasium, New Taipei City

April 23, 2023

boxscore

Taichung Suns	79–**95**	**New Taipei CTBC DEA**

Xinzhuang Gymnasium, New Taipei City

This was the second playoff meeting between these two teams, and the first since the Taichung Wagor Suns renamed to the Taichung Suns in 2022, with the Suns winning the first meeting.

Previous playoff series
Suns leads 1–0 in all-time playoff series

2022

**Taichung Wagor Suns**	**2**–1	New Taipei CTBC DEA

2022 Semifinals

=== (2) Tainan TSG GhostHawks vs. (3) Kaohsiung Aquas ===
VL Sports
ELTA TV

April 28, 2023
18:30 (UTC+8)

boxscore

Kaohsiung Aquas	103–**117**	**Tainan TSG GhostHawks**
Scoring by quarter: **28**–26, 20–**26**, 22–**35**, **33**–30
Pts: Hu Long-Mao 27; Rebs: Bohannon 10; Asts: Brickman, Alexander 7		Pts: Upshaw 28; Rebs: Upshaw 11; Asts: Li Han-Sheng 8
**GhostHawks leads series, 1–0**

Chia Nan University of Pharmacy and Science Shao Tsung Gymnasium, Tainan City
Attendance: 1,004
Referees: Lan Wei-Hsiung, Glenn Cornelio, Chan Owe Shiong

VL Sports
ELTA TV

April 30, 2023
14:00 (UTC+8)

boxscore

**Kaohsiung Aquas**	**124**–103	Tainan TSG GhostHawks
Scoring by quarter: **31**–28, **39**–22, 21–**34**, **33**–19
Pts: Brickman 34; Rebs: Bohannon 17; Asts: Brickman 12		Pts: Ku Mao Wei-Chia 24; Rebs: Deguara, Bhullar 11; Asts: Li Han-Sheng, Ku Mao Wei-Chia 4
**Series tied, 1–1**

Chia Nan University of Pharmacy and Science Shao Tsung Gymnasium, Tainan City
Attendance: 1,507
Referees: Ho Chang-Jen, Glenn Cornelio, Chan Owe Shiong

VL Sports
ELTA TV

May 3, 2023
19:00 (UTC+8)

boxscore

**Tainan TSG GhostHawks**	**97**–88	Kaohsiung Aquas
Scoring by quarter: **35**–20, 17–**22**, 18–**28**, **27**–18
Pts: Deguara 28; Rebs: Deguara 17; Asts: Ku Mao Wei-Chia 6		Pts: Brickman 24; Rebs: Bohannon 14; Asts: Brickman 8
**GhostHawks leads series, 2–1**

Kaohsiung Arena, Kaohsiung City
Attendance: 4,838
Referees: Lin Chien-Hung, Glenn Cornelio, Chan Owe Shiong

VL Sports
ELTA TV

May 5, 2023
19:00 (UTC+8)

boxscore

Tainan TSG GhostHawks	98–**99**	**Kaohsiung Aquas**
Scoring by quarter: **36**–19, **27**–26, 17–**30**, 18–**24**
Pts: Upshaw 27; Rebs: Upshaw 17; Asts: Hu Kai-Hsiang 7		Pts: Yu Huan-Ya 22; Rebs: Bohannon 10; Asts: Brickman 11
**Series tied, 2–2**

Kaohsiung Arena, Kaohsiung City
Attendance: 6,166
Referees: Glenn Cornelio, Lan Wei-Hsiung, Lai Chien-Hao

VL Sports
ELTA TV

May 8, 2023
19:00 (UTC+8)

boxscore

Kaohsiung Aquas	99–**105**	**Tainan TSG GhostHawks**
Scoring by quarter: **28**–18, 19–**24**, 26–**39**, **26**–24
Pts: Bohannon 23; Rebs: Hu Long-Mao 10; Asts: Brickman 9		Pts: Upshaw 27; Rebs: Bhullar 21; Asts: Ku Mao Wei-Chia 8
**GhostHawks wins series, 3–2**

Chia Nan University of Pharmacy and Science Shao Tsung Gymnasium, Tainan City
Attendance: 2,064
Referees: Wu Chien-Wu, Glenn Cornelio, Su Yu-Yen

Regular-season series
The GhostHawks won 5–1 in the regular-season series

December 11, 2022

boxscore

Kaohsiung Aquas	118–**119** (2OT)	**Tainan TSG GhostHawks**

Chia Nan University of Pharmacy and Science Shao Tsung Gymnasium, Tainan City

January 7, 2023

boxscore

**Tainan TSG GhostHawks**	**101**–92	Kaohsiung Aquas

Kaohsiung Arena, Kaohsiung City

February 5, 2023

boxscore

Tainan TSG GhostHawks	90–**118**	**Kaohsiung Aquas**

Kaohsiung Arena, Kaohsiung City

March 4, 2023

boxscore

Kaohsiung Aquas	100–**107**	**Tainan TSG GhostHawks**

Chia Nan University of Pharmacy and Science Shao Tsung Gymnasium, Tainan City

March 12, 2023

boxscore

**Tainan TSG GhostHawks**	**106**–94	Kaohsiung Aquas

Kaohsiung Arena, Kaohsiung City

April 1, 2023

boxscore

Kaohsiung Aquas	91–**108**	**Tainan TSG GhostHawks**

Chia Nan University of Pharmacy and Science Shao Tsung Gymnasium, Tainan City

This was the first playoff meeting between these two teams.

== T1 League Finals: (1) New Taipei CTBC DEA vs. (2) Tainan TSG GhostHawks ==
Eleven Sports
ELTA TV

May 13, 2023
14:00 (UTC+8)

boxscore

Tainan TSG GhostHawks	110–**117**	**New Taipei CTBC DEA**
Scoring by quarter: 25–**30**, 25–**30**, 28–**29**, **32**–28
Pts: Upshaw 23; Rebs: Upshaw 17; Asts: Ku Mao Wei-Chia 9		Pts: Krajina 25; Rebs: Krajina 14; Asts: Lin Wei-Han 12
**DEA leads series, 1–0**

Xinzhuang Gymnasium, New Taipei City
Attendance: 4,059
Referees: Yu Jung, Glenn Cornelio, Hsieh Shang-Chien

Eleven Sports
ELTA TV

May 15, 2023
19:00 (UTC+8)

boxscore

Tainan TSG GhostHawks	98–**108**	**New Taipei CTBC DEA**
Scoring by quarter: **28**–23, 30–**34**, **27**–23, 13–**28**
Pts: Bhullar 22; Rebs: Bhullar 18; Asts: Hu Kai-Hsiang 5		Pts: Krajina 24; Rebs: King 12; Asts: Lin Wei-Han 11
**DEA leads series, 2–0**

Xinzhuang Gymnasium, New Taipei City
Attendance: 3,622
Referees: Lin Chien-Hung, Lan Wei-Hsiung, Lai Chien-Hao

VL Sports
ELTA TV

May 19, 2023
19:00 (UTC+8)

boxscore

**New Taipei CTBC DEA**	**112**–96	Tainan TSG GhostHawks
Scoring by quarter: **38**–29, **28**–23, **29**–18, 17–**26**
Pts: King 26; Rebs: Želionis 13; Asts: Lin Wei-Han 7		Pts: Upshaw, Weathers 18; Rebs: Weathers 14; Asts: Upshaw 5
**DEA leads series, 3–0**

Chia Nan University of Pharmacy and Science Shao Tsung Gymnasium, Tainan City
Attendance: 2,065
Referees: Yu Jung, Chan Owe Shiong, Chen Chien-Lin

VL Sports
ELTA TV

May 21, 2023
14:00 (UTC+8)

boxscore

**New Taipei CTBC DEA**	**120**–93	Tainan TSG GhostHawks
Scoring by quarter: **31**–26, 29–**32**, **36**–15, **24**–20
Pts: Želionis 35; Rebs: Želionis 9 Asts: Lin Wei-Han 12		Pts: Upshaw 20; Rebs: Bhullar 14; Asts: Ku Mao Wei-Chia 9
**DEA wins series, 4–0**

Chia Nan University of Pharmacy and Science Shao Tsung Gymnasium, Tainan City
Attendance: 2,065
Referees: Chan Owe Shiong, Lin Chien-Hung, Joenard Garcia

Regular-season series
The DEA won 6–0 in the regular-season series

October 30, 2022

boxscore

Tainan TSG GhostHawks	98–**101**	**New Taipei CTBC DEA**

Xinzhuang Gymnasium, New Taipei City

November 12, 2022

boxscore

**New Taipei CTBC DEA**	**107**–104	Tainan TSG GhostHawks

Chia Nan University of Pharmacy and Science Shao Tsung Gymnasium, Tainan City

December 18, 2022

boxscore

Tainan TSG GhostHawks	93–**101**	**New Taipei CTBC DEA**

Xinzhuang Gymnasium, New Taipei City

January 14, 2023

boxscore

**New Taipei CTBC DEA**	**116**–111	Tainan TSG GhostHawks

Chia Nan University of Pharmacy and Science Shao Tsung Gymnasium, Tainan City

April 16, 2023

boxscore

**New Taipei CTBC DEA**	**114**–105	Tainan TSG GhostHawks

Chia Nan University of Pharmacy and Science Shao Tsung Gymnasium, Tainan City

April 22, 2023

boxscore

Tainan TSG GhostHawks	102–**114**	**New Taipei CTBC DEA**

Xinzhuang Gymnasium, New Taipei City

This was the first playoff meeting between these two teams.

== Statistical leaders ==
Category	Game high			Average			
Category	Player	Team	High	Player	Team	Avg.	GP
Points	Rayvonte Rice	Taichung Suns	46	Rayvonte Rice	Taichung Suns	28.8	5
Rebounds	Hasheem Thabeet	TaiwanBeer HeroBears	25	Hasheem Thabeet	TaiwanBeer HeroBears	17.5	2
Assists	Chiang Yu-An	TaiwanBeer HeroBears	14	Chiang Yu-An	TaiwanBeer HeroBears	11.0	2
Steals	Rayvonte Rice	Taichung Suns	6	Rayvonte Rice	Taichung Suns	3.4	5
Blocks	Hasheem Thabeet; Sim Bhullar	TaiwanBeer HeroBears; Tainan TSG GhostHawks	4	Hasheem Thabeet	TaiwanBeer HeroBears	2.5	2
