= 2022–23 Taoyuan Leopards season =

Taiwanese professional basketball season

- President: Liu Chin-Liang
- General Manager: Su Yi-Chieh (resigned); Chang Chien-Wei (interim)
- Head Coach: Liu Chia-Fa (transferred to player development and skills consultant); John Bennett
- Arena: National Taiwan Sport University Arena

T1 League results
- Record: 6–24 (20.0%)
- Place: 6th
- Playoffs finish: Did not qualify

Player records
- Points: Michael Efevberha 28.7
- Rebounds: Dwight Howard 16.2
- Assists: Dwight Howard 5.0

The 2022–23 Taoyuan Leopards season was the franchise's second season, its second season in the T1 League.

The Leopards were coached by Liu Chia-Fa in his second year as their head coach. On December 19, 2022, Su Yi-Chieh announced that he resigned from general manager. On December 21, the Leopards named Chang Chien-Wei, the chief executive officer of the Taoyuan Leopards, as their interim general manager. On March 24, 2023, the Leopards named Liu Chia-Fa as their player development and skills consultant, and hired John Bennett as their new head coach.

== Draft ==
Round	Player	Position(s)	School / club team
1	Chen Hsiao-Jung	Guard	NTUST
1	Chen Chien-Ming	Guard	SHU
2	Lin Tzu-Wei	Guard	NKNU

- Reference：

On June 23, 2022, the T1 League announced that the fifth place, Taoyuan Leopards, and the sixth place, Tainan TSG GhostHawks, in the 2021–22 season acquired two selections in the first round.

On August 4, 2022, the second rounder, Lin Tzu-Wei had joined the Taoyuan Pilots of the P. League+.

== Roster ==
2022–23 Taoyuan Leopards roster
Players
Coaches

Pos.	No.	Nat.	Name	Ht.	Wt.	Age	From
PG	0	(Taiwan)	Chen Hsiao-Jung	1.81 m (5 ft 11 in)	72 kg (159 lb)	23 – 6 November 1999	NTUST
PG	1	(Taiwan)	Cheng Wei (C)	1.80 m (5 ft 11 in)	90 kg (198 lb)	32 – 8 January 1991	USC
PG	2	(Taiwan)	Su Yi-Chieh	1.81 m (5 ft 11 in)	85 kg (187 lb)	36 – 28 January 1987	NTNU
G	3	(Taiwan)	Chen Chien-Ming	1.78 m (5 ft 10 in)	82 kg (181 lb)	25 – 11 September 1997	SHU
C	4	(United States)	Deyonta Davis (I)	2.11 m (6 ft 11 in)	108 kg (238 lb)	26 – 2 December 1996	Michigan State
G	5	(Sudan) (United States)	Richard Laku (I)	2.06 m (6 ft 9 in)	100 kg (220 lb)	25 – 6 May 1997	Cal State San Bernardino
PF	6	(Taiwan)	Yu Chu-Hsiang	1.97 m (6 ft 6 in)	96 kg (212 lb)	23 – 16 June 1999	SHU
SG	7	(Taiwan)	Lu Chieh-Min	1.83 m (6 ft 0 in)	92 kg (203 lb)	27 – 12 October 1995	FJU
PF	8	(Taiwan)	Du Yu-Cheng	1.83 m (6 ft 0 in)	92 kg (203 lb)	27 – 8 June 1995	VNU
PF	9	(Taiwan)	Tsai Yang-Ming	1.95 m (6 ft 5 in)	87 kg (192 lb)	28 – 18 January 1995	FJU
SG	10	(Taiwan)	Chang Shun-Cheng	1.88 m (6 ft 2 in)	70 kg (154 lb)	25 – 23 March 1998	UKN
SG	11	(Taiwan)	Lo Chen-Feng	1.95 m (6 ft 5 in)	90 kg (198 lb)	25 – 9 September 1997	NKNU
C	12	(United States)	Dwight Howard (I)	2.08 m (6 ft 10 in)	120 kg (265 lb)	37 – 8 December 1985	SACA
F	13	(Taiwan)	Lin Yi-Huei	1.96 m (6 ft 5 in)	113 kg (249 lb)	37 – 24 March 1986	NTNU
PF	15	(Taiwan)	Kao Shih-Chieh	1.96 m (6 ft 5 in)	113 kg (249 lb)	26 – 29 August 1996	NKNU
SF	17	(Taiwan)	Tseng Pin-Fu	1.95 m (6 ft 5 in)	85 kg (187 lb)	27 – 1 March 1996	UCH
G	24	(Nigeria) (United States)	Michael Efevberha (I)	1.98 m (6 ft 6 in)	88 kg (194 lb)	38 – 22 August 1984	Cal State Northridge
PF	57	(Taiwan)	Liu Hung-Po	1.93 m (6 ft 4 in)	85 kg (187 lb)	27 – 12 November 1995	NKNU
F	77	(Taiwan)	Lu Tsai Yu-Lun	1.91 m (6 ft 3 in)	97 kg (214 lb)	24 – 8 November 1998	Sendai
C	82	(Taiwan)	Liu Yuan-Kai	2.06 m (6 ft 9 in)	105 kg (231 lb)	31 – 9 July 1991	FJU
SG	92	(Taiwan)	Huang Yi-Sheng	1.85 m (6 ft 1 in)	88 kg (194 lb)	26 – 14 December 1996	SHU

Head coach

- (Canada) John Bennett

Assistant coach(es)

- (Canada) David McCulloch

Athletic trainer(s)

- (Taiwan) Chou Yueh-Chang
- (Taiwan) Cheng Po-Wei

Team manager

- (Taiwan) Chang Chien-Wei (interim)

Legend

- (C) Team captain
- (I) Import player
- Injured

- Roster
Updated: March 24, 2023

== 2022 interleague play ==
=== Standings ===
Pos	Team	Pld	W	L	PCT	GB	Qualification
1	New Taipei CTBC DEA	5	5	0	1.000	—	Advance to Quarterfinals
2	Bank of Taiwan	5	3	2	.600	2	Advance to Quarterfinals
3	Hsinchu JKO Lioneers	5	3	2	.600	2	
4	Taoyuan Leopards	5	2	3	.400	3	
5	Taichung Suns	5	2	3	.400	3	
6	Taiwan Beer	5	0	5	.000	5	

Source: Official website

=== Group match ===
September 17, 2022	New Taipei CTBC DEA	94–62	Taoyuan Leopards	Taipei City
19:30 (UTC+8)	Scoring by quarter: 24–7, 20–16, 18–19, 34–20
	Pts: Mohammad Al Bachir Gadiaga 36; Rebs: Mohammad Al Bachir Gadiaga 8 Asts: Lin Wei-Han 10	boxscore	Pts: Chen Hsiao-Jung, Cheng Wei 21; Rebs: Tseng Pin-Fu 14; Asts: Lu Chieh-Min 5	Arena: Taipei Heping Basketball Gymnasium

September 18, 2022	Taoyuan Leopards	84–75	Taiwan Beer	Taipei City
15:00 (UTC+8)	Scoring by quarter: 21–16, 22–23, 20–16, 21–20
	Pts: Huang Yi-Sheng 23; Rebs: three players 9 Asts: Chen Hsiao-Jung 5	boxscore	Pts: Yang Tian-You 21; Rebs: Chen Chao-Hao 9 Asts: Yang Tian-You 5	Arena: Taipei Heping Basketball Gymnasium

September 21, 2022	Taichung Suns	74–83	Taoyuan Leopards	Taipei City
13:00 (UTC+8)	Scoring by quarter: 9–21, 24–24, 21–15, 20–23
	Pts: Lu Kuan-Hsuan 19; Rebs: Lu Kuan-Hsuan 6 Asts: Delgerchuluun Bayasgalan 8	boxscore	Pts: Chen Hsiao-Jung 26; Rebs: Liu Yuan-Kai 12; Asts: Lu Chieh-Min 7	Arena: Taipei Heping Basketball Gymnasium

September 22, 2022	Taoyuan Leopards	69–87	Hsinchu JKO Lioneers	Taipei City
19:00 (UTC+8)	Scoring by quarter: 20–21, 16–18, 10–30, 23–18
	Pts: Cheng Wei 26; Rebs: Liu Yuan-Kai 8 Asts: Cheng Wei, Lu Chieh-Min 3	boxscore	Pts: Ifeanyi Eboka 18; Rebs: Ifeanyi Eboka 10; Asts: Tseng Po-Yu 6	Arena: Taipei Heping Basketball Gymnasium

September 24, 2022	Taoyuan Leopards	69–82	Bank of Taiwan	Taipei City
15:00 (UTC+8)	Scoring by quarter: 13–19, 17–27, 19–21, 20–15
	Pts: Chen Hsiao-Jung 20; Rebs: Liu Yuan-Kai 11; Asts: Chen Hsiao-Jung 5	boxscore	Pts: Chen You-Hsu 16; Rebs: three players 5 Asts: three players 5	Arena: Taipei Heping Basketball Gymnasium

=== Quarterfinals ===
September 25, 2022	TaiwanBeer HeroBears	90–61	Taoyuan Leopards	Taipei City
19:00 (UTC+8)	Scoring by quarter: 27–14, 25–20, 25–9, 16–18
	Pts: Tsao Xun-Xiang 21; Rebs: Fan Shih-En, Chou Po-Hsun 8 Asts: Tsao Xun-Xiang 5	boxscore	Pts: Chen Hsiao-Jung 15; Rebs: Tseng Pin-Fu 12; Asts: Cheng Wei, Lu Chieh-Min 4	Arena: Taipei Heping Basketball Gymnasium

== Preseason ==
=== Game log ===
2022 preseason game log
Total: 0–2 (home: 0–1; road: 0–1)
Preseason : 0–2 (home: 0–1; road: 0–1)

Game	Date	Team	Score	High points	High rebounds	High assists	Location Attendance	Record
1	October 15	DEA	L 72–115	Adam Łapeta (16)	Adam Łapeta (14)	Chen Hsiao-Jung (6)	Xinzhuang Gymnasium; 3,145	0–1
2	October 16	@ HeroBears	L 90–106	Troy Williams (21)	Deyonta Davis (12); Adam Łapeta (12)	Chen Hsiao-Jung (5)	Xinzhuang Gymnasium; 1,063	0–2

Color： Win Lose
Schedule

== Regular season ==
=== Standings ===
Pos	Team	Pld	W	L	PCT	GB	Qualification
1	New Taipei CTBC DEA	30	25	5	.833	—	Advance to semifinals
2	Tainan TSG GhostHawks	30	19	11	.633	6	Advance to semifinals
3	Kaohsiung Aquas	30	16	14	.533	9	Advance to semifinals
4	TaiwanBeer HeroBears	30	16	14	.533	9	Advance to play-in
5	Taichung Suns	30	8	22	.267	17	Advance to play-in
6	Taoyuan Leopards	30	6	24	.200	19	

Source: T1 League

=== Game log ===
2022–23 regular season game log
Total: 6–24 (home: 3–12; road: 3–12)
November : 1–3 (home: 1–1; road: 0–2)

Game	Date	Team	Score	High points	High rebounds	High assists	Location Attendance	Record
1	November 13	@ GhostHawks	L 100–114	Troy Williams (36)	Deyonta Davis (20)	Troy Williams (5); Cheng Wei (5)	Chia Nan University of Pharmacy and Science Shao Tsung Gymnasium; 1,857	0–1
2	November 19	DEA	W 120–115 (OT)	Dwight Howard (38)	Dwight Howard (25)	Dwight Howard (9)	National Taiwan Sport University Arena; 15,000	1–1
3	November 20	Suns	L 94–103	Troy Williams (28)	Troy Williams (13)	Dwight Howard (10)	National Taiwan Sport University Arena; 15,537	1–2
4	November 27	@ Suns	L 87–93	Troy Williams (32)	Deyonta Davis (22)	Troy Williams (5)	National Taiwan University of Sport Gymnasium; 5,861	1–3

December : 0–5 (home: 0–2; road: 0–3)

Game	Date	Team	Score	High points	High rebounds	High assists	Location Attendance	Record
5	December 4	@ Aquas	L 109–130	Troy Williams (37)	Deyonta Davis (8)	Troy Williams (7)	Kaohsiung Arena; 12,460	1–4
6	December 16	GhostHawks	L 78–87	Dwight Howard (21)	Adam Łapeta (16)	Lu Chieh-Min (4)	National Taiwan Sport University Arena; 15,050	1–5
7	December 17	@ DEA	L 94–103	Lu Chieh-Min (34)	Adam Łapeta (12)	Lin Yi-Huei (5)	Xinzhuang Gymnasium; 6,540	1–6
8	December 18	Aquas	L 89–93	Michael Efevberha (31)	Michael Efevberha (13)	Michael Efevberha (6)	National Taiwan Sport University Arena; 15,085	1–7
9	December 24	@ GhostHawks	L 96–105	Michael Efevberha (43)	Adam Łapeta (12)	Lin Yi-Huei (7)	Chia Nan University of Pharmacy and Science Shao Tsung Gymnasium; 2,200	1–8

January : 0–3 (home: 0–0; road: 0–3)

Game	Date	Team	Score	High points	High rebounds	High assists	Location Attendance	Record
10	January 2	@ Suns	L 71–96	Adam Łapeta (21)	Adam Łapeta (17)	Lu Chieh-Min (3); Chen Hsiao-Jung (3)	National Taiwan University of Sport Gymnasium; 5,328	1–9
11	January 8	@ HeroBears	L 111–114	Michael Efevberha (41)	Michael Efevberha (12)	Michael Efevberha (7)	University of Taipei Tianmu Campus Gymnasium; 4,396	1–10
12	January 15	@ Aquas	L 87–101	Michael Efevberha (33)	Dwight Howard (13)	Dwight Howard (4)	Kaohsiung Arena; 13,179	1–11

February : 3–1 (home: 0–0; road: 3–1)

Game	Date	Team	Score	High points	High rebounds	High assists	Location Attendance	Record
13	February 5	@ Suns	W 110–90	Michael Efevberha (37)	Dwight Howard (14)	Dwight Howard (6)	National Taiwan University of Sport Gymnasium; 6,243	2–11
14	February 12	@ Aquas	W 137–116	Dwight Howard (28)	Dwight Howard (22)	Dwight Howard (14)	Kaohsiung Arena; 10,058	3–11
15	February 19	@ HeroBears	W 120–108	Michael Efevberha (36)	Dwight Howard (14)	Dwight Howard (7); Michael Efevberha (7)	University of Taipei Tianmu Campus Gymnasium; 3,546	4–11
16	February 26	@ DEA	L 95–102	Dwight Howard (36)	Dwight Howard (17)	Dwight Howard (4); Michael Efevberha (4)	Xinzhuang Gymnasium; 5,952	4–12

March : 2–6 (home: 2–5; road: 0–1)

Game	Date	Team	Score	High points	High rebounds	High assists	Location Attendance	Record
17	March 5	@ DEA	L 95–101	Dwight Howard (30)	Dwight Howard (31)	Michael Efevberha (6)	Xinzhuang Gymnasium; 5,067	4–13
18	March 11	DEA	L 79–89	Michael Efevberha (34)	Dwight Howard (21)	Michael Efevberha (3)	National Taiwan Sport University Arena; 11,036	4–14
19	March 12	HeroBears	L 95–110	Dwight Howard (23)	Dwight Howard (27)	Dwight Howard (7)	National Taiwan Sport University Arena; 7,580	4–15
20	March 18	Aquas	W 90–82	Michael Efevberha (38)	Dwight Howard (12); Deyonta Davis (12)	Dwight Howard (4)	National Taiwan Sport University Arena; 10,212	5–15
21	March 19	HeroBears	L 98–99	Michael Efevberha (31)	Dwight Howard (21)	Cheng Wei (5)	National Taiwan Sport University Arena; 8,253	5–16
22	March 25	GhostHawks	W 107–97	Michael Efevberha (34)	Dwight Howard (13)	Michael Efevberha (6)	National Taiwan Sport University Arena; 10,082	6–16
23	March 26	Aquas	L 93–106	Michael Efevberha (29)	Dwight Howard (14)	Cheng Wei (4)	National Taiwan Sport University Arena; 8,212	6–17
24	March 31	Suns	L 97–101	Michael Efevberha (50)	Dwight Howard (19)	Dwight Howard (5)	National Taiwan Sport University Arena; 6,947	6–18

April : 0–6 (home: 0–4; road: 0–2)

Game	Date	Team	Score	High points	High rebounds	High assists	Location Attendance	Record
25	April 2	HeroBears	L 92–117	Michael Efevberha (25)	Deyonta Davis (14)	Michael Efevberha (7)	National Taiwan Sport University Arena; 7,382	6–19
26	April 4	DEA	L 92–108	Dwight Howard (25)	Michael Efevberha (12)	Chen Hsiao-Jung (4); Dwight Howard (4); Michael Efevberha (4)	National Taiwan Sport University Arena; 7,108	6–20
27	April 8	Suns	L 93–97	Dwight Howard (26)	Dwight Howard (19)	Cheng Wei (8)	National Taiwan Sport University Arena; 9,422	6–21
28	April 9	GhostHawks	L 84–92	Cheng Wei (23)	Deyonta Davis (19)	Cheng Wei (6)	National Taiwan Sport University Arena; 7,200	6–22
29	April 15	@ GhostHawks	L 65–108	Deyonta Davis (29)	Deyonta Davis (19)	Cheng Wei (7)	Chia Nan University of Pharmacy and Science Shao Tsung Gymnasium; 1,609	6–23
30	April 22	@ HeroBears	L 86–93	Deyonta Davis (31)	Deyonta Davis (25)	Cheng Wei (7)	Fu Jen Catholic University Chung Mei Auditorium; 1,989	6–24

Color： Win Lose
Schedule

== Player statistics ==
Legend
GP	Games played	MPG	Minutes per game	FG%	Field goal percentage
3P%	3-point field goal percentage	FT%	Free throw percentage	RPG	Rebounds per game
APG	Assists per game	SPG	Steals per game	BPG	Blocks per game
PPG	Points per game		Led the league

=== Regular season ===
Player	GP	MPG	PPG	FG%	3P%	FT%	RPG	APG	SPG	BPG
Chen Hsiao-Jung	23	22:40	6.5	30.0%	28.2%	61.9%	1.7	1.7	0.7	0.0
Cheng Wei	28	25:40	8.0	32.2%	26.2%	76.0%	1.9	3.2	0.6	0.0
Su Yi-Chieh	3	26:48	8.3	42.3%	20.0%	50.0%	2.0	3.3	0.0	0.0
Chen Chien-Ming	11	15:22	2.4	22.0%	12.5%	62.5%	1.5	1.7	0.4	0.0
Deyonta Davis	25	29:07	16.0	49.1%	29.8%	56.1%	11.4	1.0	1.4	2.2
Troy Williams^{‡}	5	37:27	30.8	39.7%	27.7%	64.3%	8.6	4.6	2.0	0.4
Richard Laku^{≠}	3	15:31	5.3	20.0%	16.7%	100.0%	4.7	0.7	0.7	0.0
Yu Chu-Hsiang	2	1:39	0.0	0.0%	0.0%	0.0%	0.0	0.0	0.0	0.0
Lu Chieh-Min	27	33:39	11.9	39.3%	39.0%	83.3%	2.7	1.9	1.2	0.1
Du Yu-Cheng	Did not play									
Tsai Yang-Ming	6	3:44	0.0	0.0%	0.0%	0.0%	0.2	0.2	0.2	0.0
Chang Shun-Cheng	13	13:31	1.8	25.6%	14.3%	33.3%	1.8	0.8	0.2	0.0
Lo Chen-Feng	23	22:14	6.3	40.6%	35.7%	52.2%	1.9	0.8	0.7	0.3
Dwight Howard	20	34:23	23.2	50.0%	22.9%	69.1%	16.2	5.0	0.5	1.2
Lin Yi-Huei^{≠}	12	33:43	9.3	39.6%	28.3%	65.0%	3.8	2.7	1.3	0.1
Kao Shih-Chieh	6	6:55	2.0	45.5%	33.3%	0.0%	1.2	0.0	0.5	0.0
Adam Łapeta^{‡}	5	36:31	9.2	51.6%	0.0%	53.8%	13.8	1.0	2.0	1.6
Tseng Pin-Fu	26	17:12	2.5	28.8%	27.7%	66.7%	2.1	0.7	0.5	0.1
Michael Efevberha^{≠}	21	38:15	28.7	43.2%	35.2%	91.2%	8.1	4.1	1.9	0.9
Liu Hung-Po	Did not play									
Lu Tsai Yu-Lun^{≠}	10	5:36	0.8	12.5%	7.7%	100.0%	0.7	0.3	0.1	0.1
Liu Yuan-Kai	27	14:25	2.4	45.5%	0.0%	55.6%	2.7	0.6	0.3	0.1
Huang Yi-Sheng	14	9:53	0.4	10.0%	10.0%	0.0%	0.4	0.3	0.1	0.0

^{‡} Left during the season
^{≠} Acquired during the season

- Reference：

== Transactions ==
=== Overview ===
Players added

Via draft

- Chen Chien-Ming
- Chen Hsiao-Jung

Via trade

- Yu Chu-Hsiang

Via free agency

- Michael Efevberha
- Dwight Howard
- Kao Shih-Chieh
- Richard Laku
- Adam Łapeta
- Lin Yi-Huei
- Liu Yuan-Kai
- Su Yi-Chieh
- Tseng Pin-Fu

On loan

- Lu Tsai Yu-Lun
Players lost

Via free agency

- Chang Chih-Feng
- John Gillon
- Elijah Thomas
- Caelan Tiongson
- Yu Meng-Yun

Waived

- Adam Łapeta
- Troy Williams
- Wu Chi-Ying
- Xie Yu-Zheng

=== Trades ===
Date	Trade		Ref.
June 20, 2022	To Taoyuan Leopards: Yu Chu-Hsiang	To Taichung Wagor Suns: Cash considerations	

=== On loan ===
Date	Player	Owner team	Loan season	Ref.
February 2, 2023	Lu Tsai Yu-Lun	TaiwanBeer HeroBears	2022–23 T1 League season	

=== Free agency ===
==== Re-signed ====
Date	Player	Contract terms	Ref.
June 27, 2022	Troy Williams	—N/a	
June 30, 2022	Deyonta Davis	—N/a	
August 10, 2022	Lo Chen-Feng	contract renewal, 2+2-year contract, worth NT$12 million	
August 10, 2022	Lu Chieh-Min	contract renewal, 2+1-year contract, worth NT$7.8 million	
August 10, 2022	Cheng Wei	contract renewal, 2+1-year contract, worth NT$6 million	

==== Additions ====
Date	Player	Contract terms	Former team	Ref.
June 14, 2022	Liu Yuan-Kai	—N/a	(Taiwan) Taipei Dacin Tigers	
July 13, 2022	Chen Hsiao-Jung	—N/a	(Taiwan) NTUST	
July 19, 2022	Chen Chien-Ming	—N/a	(Taiwan) SHU	
August 18, 2022	Tseng Pin-Fu	—N/a	(Taiwan) Tainan TSG GhostHawks	
August 26, 2022	Kao Shih-Chieh	—N/a	(Taiwan) NTUS basketball team coach	
September 14, 2022	Adam Łapeta	—N/a	(Lithuania) Alytus Dzūkija	
October 28, 2022	Su Yi-Chieh	—N/a	(Taiwan) Taoyuan Leopards general manager	
November 8, 2022	Dwight Howard	exceed US$200,000 per month	(United States) Los Angeles Lakers	
November 25, 2022	Michael Efevberha	—N/a	(France) Béliers de Kemper	
December 15, 2022	Lin Yi-Huei	—N/a	(Taiwan) Hsinchu JKO Lioneers	
March 5, 2023	Richard Laku	—N/a	(Estonia) Keila KK	

==== Subtractions ====
Date	Player	Reason	New team	Ref.
June 24, 2022	Elijah Thomas	Contract expired	(Dominican Republic) Titanes del Distrito Nacional	
July 20, 2022	Xie Yu-Zheng	Contract terminated	(Taiwan) Changhua Jr.	
July 20, 2022	Wu Chi-Ying	Contract terminated	(Taiwan) Yulon Luxgen Dinos	
August 17, 2022	Chang Chih-Feng	Contract expired	(Taiwan) CYCU basketball team head coach	
September 14, 2022	Caelan Tiongson	Contract expired	(Philippines) Barangay Ginebra San Miguel	
September 14, 2022	John Gillon	Contract expired	(Lithuania) Pieno žvaigždės Pasvalys	
November 2, 2022	Yu Meng-Yun	Contract expired	—N/a	
February 2, 2023	Troy Williams	Contract terminated	(Philippines) Blackwater Bossing	
March 5, 2023	Adam Łapeta	Injury	(Poland) PGE Spójnia Stargard	

== Awards ==
=== Yearly awards ===
Recipient	Award	Ref.
Michael Efevberha	Points Leader	
Dwight Howard	Rebounds Leader	
Dwight Howard	All-Defensive First Team	
Dwight Howard	All-T1 League First Team	
Dwight Howard	Most Valuable Import	
Deyonta Davis	Blocks Leader	
Deyonta Davis	All-Defensive First Team	

=== All-Star Game awards ===
Recipient	Award	Ref.
Dwight Howard	All-Star Game Most Famous Player	
Dwight Howard	All-Star Game MVP	

=== Import of the Month ===
Month	Recipient	Award	Ref.
February	Dwight Howard	February Import of the Month	
