= 2022–23 Kaohsiung Aquas season =

Taiwanese professional basketball season

- President: Hou Chia-Chi
- Head Coach: Brendan Joyce
- Arena: Kaohsiung Arena

T1 League results
- Record: 16–14 (53.3%)
- Place: 3rd
- Playoffs finish: Semifinals (lost to GhostHawks, 2–3)

Player records
- Points: Mindaugas Kupšas 21.1
- Rebounds: Mindaugas Kupšas 11.8
- Assists: Jason Brickman 9.6

The 2022–23 Kaohsiung Aquas season was the franchise's second season, its second season in the T1 League.

The Aquas were coached by Brendan Joyce in his second year as their head coach.

== Draft ==
Round	Player	Position(s)	School / club team
1	Chiu Tzu-Hsuan	Guard / forward	ISU
1	Pai Yao-Cheng	Guard	ISU

- Reference：

On July 11, 2022, the Aquas acquired 2022 first-round pick from New Taipei CTBC DEA in exchange for cash considerations.

On August 4, 2022, the first rounder, Pai Yao-Cheng had joined the Taoyuan Pilots of the P. League+.

== Roster ==
2022–23 Kaohsiung Aquas roster
Players
Coaches

Pos.	No.	Nat.	Name	Ht.	Wt.	Age	From
C	3	(Taiwan)	Wang Yung-Cheng	1.96 m (6 ft 5 in)	92 kg (203 lb)	24 – 29 December 1998	NCCU
PG	5	(Philippines) (United States)	Jason Brickman (I)	1.79 m (5 ft 10 in)	79 kg (174 lb)	31 – 19 November 1991	LIU Brooklyn
PG	7	(Taiwan)	Yu Huan-Ya	1.82 m (6 ft 0 in)	80 kg (176 lb)	29 – 30 November 1993	NTNU
SG	8	(Taiwan)	Chiu Tzu-Hsuan	1.90 m (6 ft 3 in)	90 kg (198 lb)	23 – 8 December 1999	ISU
PG	9	(Taiwan)	Chen Huai-An	1.86 m (6 ft 1 in)	90 kg (198 lb)	26 – 29 April 1997	NTUA
SF	10	(Taiwan)	Hu Long-Mao	1.95 m (6 ft 5 in)	97 kg (214 lb)	30 – 22 December 1992	Chaminade
SF	12	(Taiwan)	Lin Jen-Hung	1.94 m (6 ft 4 in)	88 kg (194 lb)	29 – 18 December 1993	NTNU
G/F	15	(United States)	Xavier Alexander (I)	1.98 m (6 ft 6 in)	102 kg (225 lb)	34 – 19 October 1988	Southern Nazarene
PF	18	(Taiwan)	Wu I-Ping	2.00 m (6 ft 7 in)	90 kg (198 lb)	30 – 29 August 1992	ISU
C	21	(Taiwan)	Lu Wei-Ting	2.00 m (6 ft 7 in)	100 kg (220 lb)	26 – 16 April 1997	ISU
C	23	(Jordan) (United States)	John Bohannon (I)	2.11 m (6 ft 11 in)	105 kg (231 lb)	31 – 29 October 1991	UTEP
SG	24	(Taiwan)	Su Wen-Ju	1.87 m (6 ft 2 in)	80 kg (176 lb)	25 – 16 October 1997	ISU
SG	28	(Taiwan)	Yu Chun-An (C)	1.89 m (6 ft 2 in)	83 kg (183 lb)	31 – 13 February 1992	NTNU
C	49	(Lithuania)	Mindaugas Kupšas (I)	2.17 m (7 ft 1 in)	122 kg (269 lb)	32 – 9 April 1991	LSU
SF	57	(Taiwan)	Wu Siao-Jin	1.90 m (6 ft 3 in)	83 kg (183 lb)	27 – 28 August 1995	NKNU
PF	85	(Taiwan)	Chin Ming-Ching	1.95 m (6 ft 5 in)	110 kg (243 lb)	28 – 14 November 1994	NTNU

Head coach

- (Australia) Brendan Joyce

Assistant coach(es)

- (Taiwan) Zhu Yong-Hong
- (Taiwan) Peng Te-Hsuan
- (Taiwan) Liao Che-Yi

Athletic trainer(s)

- (Taiwan) Liao Hsuan-Yi

Legend

- (C) Team captain
- (I) Import player
- Injured

- Roster
Updated: March 8, 2023

== Preseason ==
=== Game log ===
2022 preseason game log
Total: 1–1 (home: 1–0; road: 0–1)
Preseason : 1–1 (home: 1–0; road: 0–1)

Game	Date	Team	Score	High points	High rebounds	High assists	Location Attendance	Record
1	October 14	@ DEA	L 115–116	Hu Long-Mao (26); Mindaugas Kupšas (26)	Mindaugas Kupšas (16)	Jason Brickman (8)	Xinzhuang Gymnasium	0–1
2	October 16	Suns	W 93–62	Mindaugas Kupšas (24)	Mindaugas Kupšas (21)	Jason Brickman (9)	Xinzhuang Gymnasium; 1,063	1–1

Color： Win Lose
Schedule

== Regular season ==
=== Standings ===
Pos	Team	Pld	W	L	PCT	GB	Qualification
1	New Taipei CTBC DEA	30	25	5	.833	—	Advance to semifinals
2	Tainan TSG GhostHawks	30	19	11	.633	6	Advance to semifinals
3	Kaohsiung Aquas	30	16	14	.533	9	Advance to semifinals
4	TaiwanBeer HeroBears	30	16	14	.533	9	Advance to play-in
5	Taichung Suns	30	8	22	.267	17	Advance to play-in
6	Taoyuan Leopards	30	6	24	.200	19	

Source: T1 League

=== Game log ===
2022–23 regular season game log
Total: 16–14 (home: 10–5; road: 6–9)
October : 0–1 (home: 0–0; road: 0–1)

Game	Date	Team	Score	High points	High rebounds	High assists	Location Attendance	Record
1	October 29	@ DEA	L 87–109	Mindaugas Kupšas (18)	Mindaugas Kupšas (15)	Mindaugas Kupšas (3); Chen Huai-An (3)	Xinzhuang Gymnasium; 5,652	0–1

November : 3–1 (home: 1–1; road: 2–0)

Game	Date	Team	Score	High points	High rebounds	High assists	Location Attendance	Record
2	November 5	@ Suns	W 99–79	Hu Long-Mao (27)	Mindaugas Kupšas (8)	Jason Brickman (11)	National Taiwan University of Sport Gymnasium; 2,425	1–1
3	November 12	@ HeroBears	W 111–101	Mindaugas Kupšas (33)	John Bohannon (11)	Jason Brickman (10)	University of Taipei Tianmu Campus Gymnasium; 3,129	2–1
4	November 26	DEA	W 105–81	Jason Brickman (24)	Mindaugas Kupšas (14)	Jason Brickman (7)	Kaohsiung Arena; 10,823	3–1
5	November 27	HeroBears	L 97–98	Mindaugas Kupšas (27)	Mindaugas Kupšas (12)	Jason Brickman (7)	Kaohsiung Arena; 6,071	3–2

December : 4–2 (home: 2–0; road: 2–2)

Game	Date	Team	Score	High points	High rebounds	High assists	Location Attendance	Record
6	December 3	Suns	W 120–90	Jason Brickman (21)	Mindaugas Kupšas (12)	Jason Brickman (11)	Kaohsiung Arena; 2,486	4–2
7	December 4	Leopards	W 130–109	Chiu Tzu-Hsuan (31)	Mindaugas Kupšas (19)	Jason Brickman (13)	Kaohsiung Arena; 12,460	5–2
8	December 11	@ GhostHawks	L 118–119 (2OT)	Mindaugas Kupšas (30)	Mindaugas Kupšas (12)	Jason Brickman (13)	Chia Nan University of Pharmacy and Science Shao Tsung Gymnasium; 1,051	5–3
9	December 18	@ Leopards	W 93–89	Mindaugas Kupšas (20)	Jason Brickman (12)	Jason Brickman (11)	National Taiwan Sport University Arena; 15,085	6–3
10	December 24	@ DEA	L 85–93	Mindaugas Kupšas (26)	Hu Long-Mao (9); John Bohannon (9)	Jason Brickman (11)	Xinzhuang Gymnasium; 3,495	6–4
11	December 31	@ Suns	W 100–92	Hu Long-Mao (20)	Hu Long-Mao (14); John Bohannon (14)	Jason Brickman (11)	National Taiwan University of Sport Gymnasium; 1,518	7–4

January : 2–1 (home: 2–1; road: 0–0)

Game	Date	Team	Score	High points	High rebounds	High assists	Location Attendance	Record
12	January 7	GhostHawks	L 92–101	Mindaugas Kupšas (22)	Mindaugas Kupšas (9)	Jason Brickman (11)	Kaohsiung Arena; 3,128	7–5
13	January 8	DEA	W 105–87	Mindaugas Kupšas (21)	Mindaugas Kupšas (11)	Jason Brickman (9)	Kaohsiung Arena; 5,495	8–5
—	January 14	Suns	Postponed					
14	January 15	Leopards	W 101–87	Jason Brickman (21)	John Bohannon (16)	Jason Brickman (10)	Kaohsiung Arena; 13,179	9–5

February : 2–4 (home: 2–2; road: 0–2)

Game	Date	Team	Score	High points	High rebounds	High assists	Location Attendance	Record
15	February 4	HeroBears	W 122–117 (OT)	Mindaugas Kupšas (41)	Mindaugas Kupšas (16)	Jason Brickman (13)	Kaohsiung Arena; 4,689	10–5
16	February 5	GhostHawks	W 118–90	Jason Brickman (30)	Mindaugas Kupšas (13)	Mindaugas Kupšas (7)	Kaohsiung Arena; 3,796	11–5
17	February 11	DEA	L 77–88	John Bohannon (17)	John Bohannon (9)	Jason Brickman (9)	Kaohsiung Arena; 4,266	11–6
18	February 12	Leopards	L 116–137	John Bohannon (25)	John Bohannon (13)	Jason Brickman (8); Hu Long-Mao (8)	Kaohsiung Arena; 10,058	11–7
19	February 18	@ HeroBears	L 74–78	Hu Long-Mao (13); John Bohannon (13)	John Bohannon (13)	Jason Brickman (5); John Bohannon (5)	University of Taipei Tianmu Campus Gymnasium; 2,604	11–8
20	February 25	@ DEA	L 86–93	Mindaugas Kupšas (28)	Mindaugas Kupšas (17)	John Bohannon (6)	Xinzhuang Gymnasium; 4,271	11–9

March : 4–3 (home: 3–1; road: 1–2)

Game	Date	Team	Score	High points	High rebounds	High assists	Location Attendance	Record
21	March 4	@ GhostHawks	L 100–107	Jason Brickman (21)	John Bohannon (16)	Jason Brickman (7)	Chia Nan University of Pharmacy and Science Shao Tsung Gymnasium; 1,185	11–10
22	March 8	HeroBears	W 109–97	Mindaugas Kupšas (28)	Mindaugas Kupšas (13)	Jason Brickman (11)	Kaohsiung Arena; 2,858	12–10
23	March 11	Suns	W 97–92	Mindaugas Kupšas (25)	Mindaugas Kupšas (16)	Jason Brickman (17)	Kaohsiung Arena; 5,227	13–10
24	March 12	GhostHawks	L 94–106	Mindaugas Kupšas (23)	Mindaugas Kupšas (16)	Jason Brickman (8)	Kaohsiung Arena; 5,188	13–11
25	March 18	@ Leopards	L 82–90	Jason Brickman (21)	John Bohannon (15)	Jason Brickman (9)	National Taiwan Sport University Arena; 10,212	13–12
26	—	Suns	W 20–0	Called Win				14–12
27	March 26	@ Leopards	W 106–93	Xavier Alexander (24)	Xavier Alexander (12)	Jason Brickman (13)	National Taiwan Sport University Arena; 8,212	15–12

April : 1–2 (home: 0–0; road: 1–2)

Game	Date	Team	Score	High points	High rebounds	High assists	Location Attendance	Record
28	April 1	@ GhostHawks	L 91–108	John Bohannon (16)	John Bohannon (13)	Jason Brickman (6)	Chia Nan University of Pharmacy and Science Shao Tsung Gymnasium; 1,150	15–13
29	April 9	@ HeroBears	L 87–99	Yu Huan-Ya (16)	Xavier Alexander (14)	Jason Brickman (11)	Fu Jen Catholic University Chung Mei Auditorium; 1,178	15–14
30	April 16	@ Suns	W 111–104	Hu Long-Mao (31)	John Bohannon (17)	Jason Brickman (13)	National Taiwan University of Sport Gymnasium; 1,763	16–14

Color： Win Lose Postponed
Schedule

=== Regular season note ===
- Due to the Taichung Suns could not reach the minimum player number, the T1 League declared that the game on January 14 would be postponed.
- Due to the Taichung Suns could not cooperate with the make-up game, the T1 League announced that the game on January 14 was called win to Kaohsiung Aquas.

== Playoffs ==
=== Game log ===
2023 playoffs game log
Total: 2–3 (home: 1–1; road: 1–2)
Semifinals : 2–3 (home: 1–1; road: 1–2)

Game	Date	Team	Score	High points	High rebounds	High assists	Location Attendance	Series
1	April 28	@ GhostHawks	L 103–117	Hu Long-Mao (27)	John Bohannon (10)	Jason Brickman (7); Xavier Alexander (7)	Chia Nan University of Pharmacy and Science Shao Tsung Gymnasium; 1,004	0–1
2	April 30	@ GhostHawks	W 124–103	Jason Brickman (34)	John Bohannon (17)	Jason Brickman (12)	Chia Nan University of Pharmacy and Science Shao Tsung Gymnasium; 1,507	1–1
3	May 3	GhostHawks	L 88–97	Jason Brickman (24)	John Bohannon (14)	Jason Brickman (8)	Kaohsiung Arena; 4,838	1–2
4	May 5	GhostHawks	W 99–98	Yu Huan-Ya (22)	John Bohannon (10)	Jason Brickman (11)	Kaohsiung Arena; 6,166	2–2
5	May 8	@ GhostHawks	L 99–105	John Bohannon (23)	Hu Long-Mao (10)	Jason Brickman (9)	Chia Nan University of Pharmacy and Science Shao Tsung Gymnasium; 2,064	2–3

Color： Win Lose
Schedule

== Player statistics ==
Legend
GP	Games played	MPG	Minutes per game	FG%	Field goal percentage
3P%	3-point field goal percentage	FT%	Free throw percentage	RPG	Rebounds per game
APG	Assists per game	SPG	Steals per game	BPG	Blocks per game
PPG	Points per game		Led the league

=== Regular season ===
Player	GP	MPG	PPG	FG%	3P%	FT%	RPG	APG	SPG	BPG
Elijah Thomas^{≠‡}	3	17:10	11.0	52.0%	0.0%	53.8%	7.3	0.0	0.7	1.3
Wang Yung-Cheng	8	3:38	0.8	40.0%	33.3%	25.0%	0.4	0.0	0.1	0.0
Jason Brickman	29	42:15	16.1	42.2%	37.6%	75.4%	6.4	9.6	2.0	0.0
Yu Huan-Ya	29	34:45	11.5	42.6%	39.9%	57.7%	3.2	2.5	0.8	0.1
Chiu Tzu-Hsuan	28	19:39	7.7	36.5%	28.0%	86.8%	3.0	1.2	0.8	0.0
Chen Huai-An	18	5:20	2.4	40.5%	38.9%	75.0%	0.9	1.4	0.1	0.0
Hu Long-Mao	28	29:13	14.3	40.5%	33.7%	66.7%	4.7	2.7	1.1	0.0
Lin Jen-Hung	19	24:58	8.6	42.3%	29.1%	75.0%	2.2	2.1	1.2	0.3
Xavier Alexander^{≠}	5	25:16	12.8	37.5%	26.1%	55.2%	8.8	3.8	0.6	0.4
Wu I-Ping	28	9:41	2.4	31.9%	18.5%	80.0%	1.6	0.6	0.2	0.2
Lu Wei-Ting	21	10:14	2.9	30.3%	19.4%	55.6%	2.0	0.4	0.8	0.3
John Bohannon	27	21:05	9.2	53.4%	20.0%	50.0%	10.0	2.3	1.1	0.7
Su Wen-Ju	21	8:33	3.4	46.0%	48.0%	93.3%	1.4	0.3	0.5	0.0
Yu Chun-An	27	7:11	2.5	36.2%	25.0%	41.2%	0.9	0.4	0.1	0.1
Mindaugas Kupšas	22	32:18	21.1	54.1%	0.0%	75.3%	11.8	2.4	1.0	1.2
Wu Siao-Jin	29	16:42	6.8	42.9%	33.7%	66.7%	1.0	0.3	0.5	0.1
Chin Ming-Ching	8	3:42	1.3	42.9%	0.0%	66.7%	0.9	0.0	0.0	0.0

^{‡} Left during the season
^{≠} Acquired during the season

=== Semifinals ===
Player	GP	MPG	PPG	FG%	3P%	FT%	RPG	APG	SPG	BPG
Wang Yung-Cheng	Did not play									
Jason Brickman	5	45:11	22.2	50.0%	27.8%	84.6%	4.6	9.4	1.8	0.0
Yu Huan-Ya	5	28:26	12.8	44.4%	45.7%	100.0%	2.4	1.2	0.6	0.0
Chiu Tzu-Hsuan	5	25:24	9.8	38.1%	36.0%	80.0%	3.2	1.6	1.0	0.0
Chen Huai-An	2	3:48	3.0	50.0%	66.7%	0.0%	0.5	0.0	0.5	0.0
Hu Long-Mao	5	38:02	16.2	33.3%	28.1%	52.9%	6.0	2.6	0.6	0.0
Lin Jen-Hung	3	9:50	3.0	50.0%	0.0%	50.0%	0.7	1.3	0.3	0.0
Xavier Alexander	5	12:44	4.4	31.8%	16.7%	63.6%	2.2	2.0	0.4	1.0
Wu I-Ping	2	1:53	0.0	0.0%	0.0%	0.0%	0.0	0.0	0.0	0.0
Lu Wei-Ting	5	11:33	4.8	30.4%	21.4%	70.0%	1.0	0.6	1.0	0.4
John Bohannon	5	37:01	16.0	55.9%	25.0%	63.2%	12.0	4.4	2.4	1.8
Su Wen-Ju	5	11:26	3.6	40.0%	14.3%	83.3%	1.2	0.4	1.2	0.0
Yu Chun-An	5	10:47	4.4	34.8%	25.0%	50.0%	1.0	0.4	0.0	0.4
Mindaugas Kupšas	Did not play									
Wu Siao-Jin	5	10:30	5.4	35.7%	31.3%	50.0%	1.2	0.4	0.6	0.2
Chin Ming-Ching	2	1:45	0.0	0.0%	0.0%	0.0%	0.5	0.0	0.0	0.0

- Reference：

== Transactions ==
=== Overview ===
Players added

Via draft

- Chiu Tzu-Hsuan

Via free agency

- Xavier Alexander
- John Bohannon
- Elijah Thomas
- Wang Yung-Cheng
Players lost

Via free agency

- Xavier Alexander
- Ferrakohn Hall
- Li Han-Sheng
- Negus Webster-Chan

Waived

- Elijah Thomas

=== Trades ===
Date	Trade		Ref.
July 11, 2022	To Kaohsiung Aquas: 2022 DEA's first-round pick	To New Taipei CTBC DEA: Cash considerations	

=== Free agency ===
==== Re-signed ====
Date	Player	Contract terms	Ref.
July 20, 2022	Mindaugas Kupšas	—N/a	
July 21, 2022	Jason Brickman	—N/a	
July 22, 2022	Yu Huan-Ya	—N/a	
July 26, 2022	Lin Jen-Hung	—N/a	

==== Additions ====
Date	Player	Contract terms	Former team	Ref.
July 31, 2022	Chiu Tzu-Hsuan	—N/a	(Taiwan) ISU	
August 30, 2022	Wang Yung-Cheng	—N/a	(Taiwan) Kaohsiung Jeoutai Technology	
October 5, 2022	John Bohannon	—N/a	(New Zealand) Manawatu Jets	
January 18, 2023	Elijah Thomas	—N/a	(Japan) Earthfriends Tokyo Z	
March 17, 2023	Xavier Alexander	—N/a	Singapore Slingers	

==== Subtractions ====
Date	Player	Reason	New team	Ref.
July 2, 2022	Xavier Alexander	Contract expired	(Mexico) Halcones de Xalapa	
July 3, 2022	Li Han-Sheng	Contract expired	(Taiwan) Tainan TSG GhostHawks	
September 9, 2022	Ferrakohn Hall	Contract expired	—N/a	
September 20, 2022	Negus Webster-Chan	Contract expired	(United States) Team AboutBillions	
March 7, 2023	Elijah Thomas	Contract terminated	(Mexico) Pioneros de Los Mochis	

== Awards ==
=== Yearly Awards ===
Recipient	Award	Ref.
Hu Long-Mao	All-Defensive First Team	
Jason Brickman	All-T1 League First Team	

=== MVP of the Month ===
Month	Recipient	Award	Ref.
April	Hu Long-Mao	April MVP of the Month	
