= Taipei Municipal University of Education =

Former university in Zhongzheng, Taipei, Taiwan

Bo'ai Campus, University of Taipei 臺北市立大學博愛校區
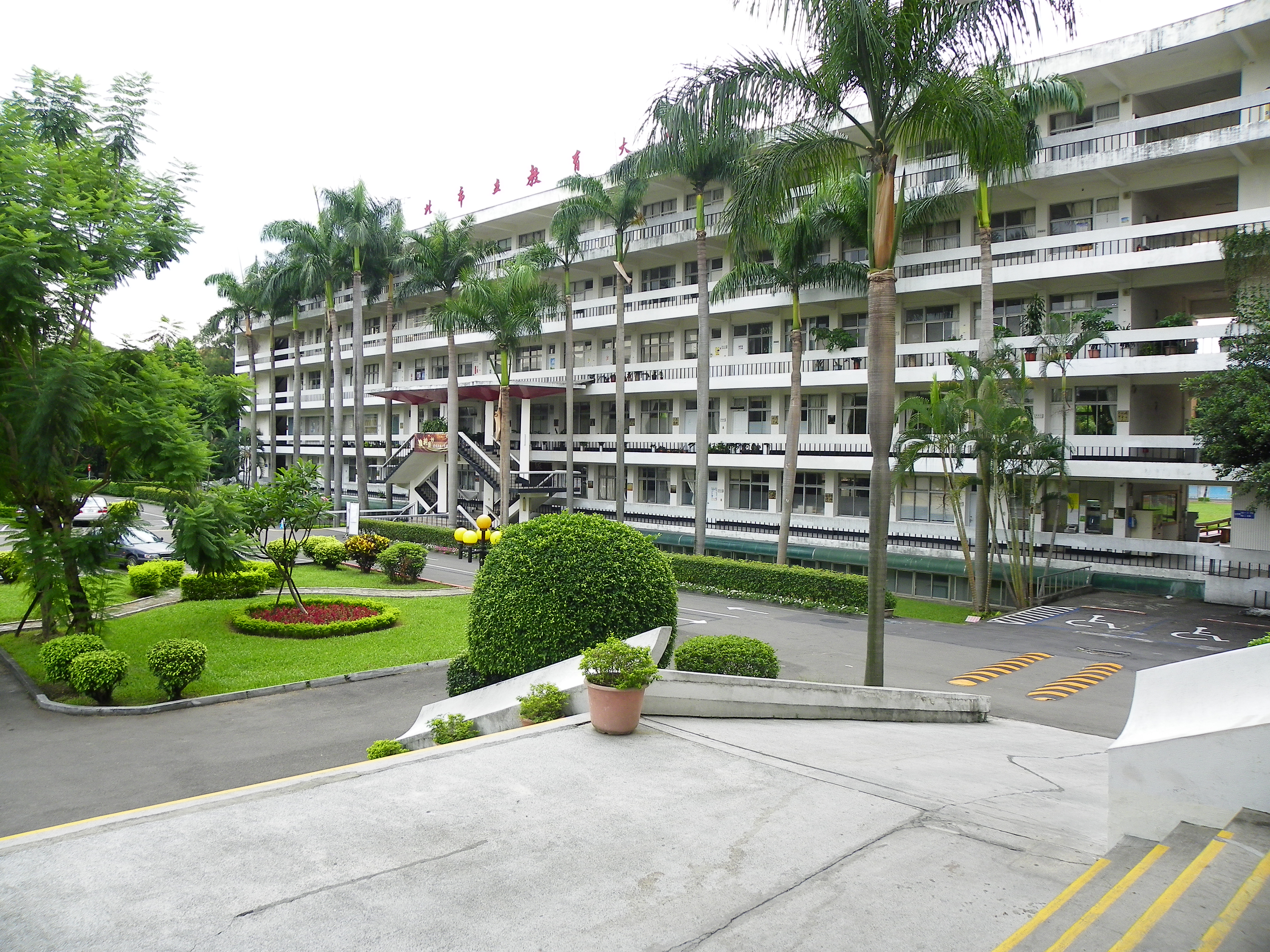
- Established: 1895 (as Academy of Language); 2005 (as TMUE); 2013 (as University of Taipei)
- Location: Zhongzheng, Taipei, Taiwan

Bo'ai Campus, University of Taipei (Chinese: 臺北市立大學博愛校區) was a normal university in Zhongzheng District, Taipei, Taiwan.

== History ==
TMUE was founded as Academy of Language in 1895. In 1987, it became the Taipei Municipal Teacher's College. In 2005, it was granted university status and changed to its current name Taipei Municipal University of Education (TMUE). In August 2013, TMUE was merged with Taipei Physical Education College to form the University of Taipei.

== See also ==
- Education in Taiwan
