= Demitrius Conger =

American basketball player

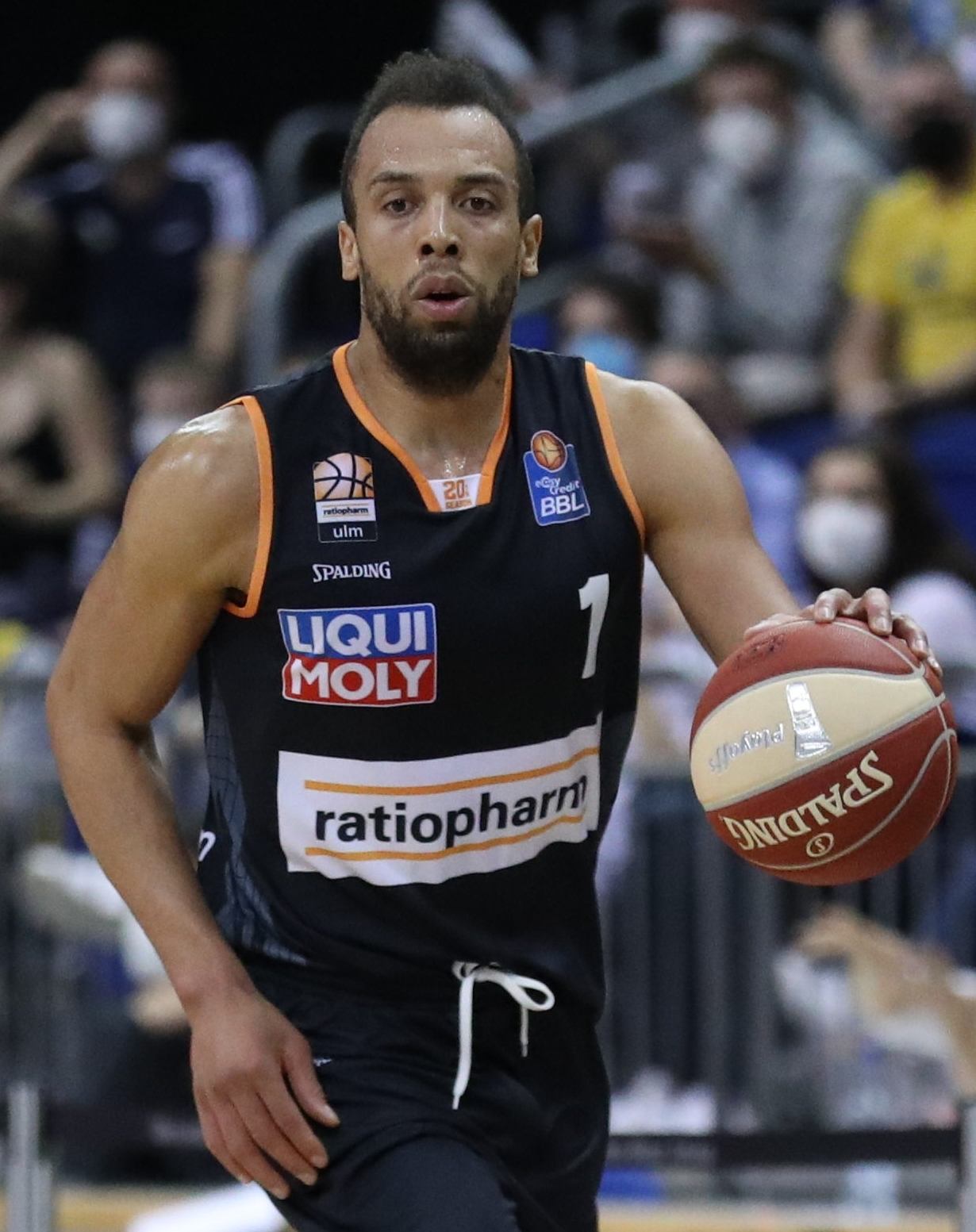
- Conger with ratiopharm Ulm in 2021

Golden Eagle Ylli
- Position: Small forward / Shooting guard
- League: Kosovo Basketball Superleague; Liga Unike

Personal information
- Born: May 29, 1990 (age 36) Brooklyn, New York, U.S.
- Listed height: 6 ft 6 in (1.98 m)
- Listed weight: 205 lb (93 kg)

Career information
- High school: Covenant Christian Academy (Cumming, Georgia)
- College: St. Bonaventure (2009–2013)
- NBA draft: 2013: undrafted
- Playing career: 2013–present

Career history
- 2013: Indios de San Francisco
- 2013–2014: Lucca
- 2014–2015: Omegna
- 2015–2016: Aries Trikala
- 2016: Hapoel Tel Aviv
- 2016–2017: Antwerp Giants
- 2017–2018: Illawarra Hawks
- 2018: Joventut
- 2018: Le Mans Sarthe
- 2018–2019: Adelaide 36ers
- 2019: Hapoel Jerusalem
- 2019–2020: Real Betis
- 2020–2021: ratiopharm Ulm
- 2021: Petkim Spor
- 2021–2022: Oostende
- 2022–2023: New Taipei CTBC DEA
- 2023: Rapid București
- 2023–2024: Astros de Jalisco
- 2024: Dorados de Chihuahua
- 2025: Urunday Universitario
- 2026–present: Golden Eagle Ylli

Career highlights
- Belgian League champion (2022); Belgian Supercup champion (2017); All-NBL First Team (2018)

Demitrius Rayelle Conger (born May 29, 1990) is an American professional basketball player for Golden Eagle Ylli. A Brooklyn native, Conger applied his trade throughout Europe following his college career with St. Bonaventure and arrived in Australia to join the Illawarra Hawks in 2017 following four years of playing professionally in the Dominican Republic, Italy, Greece, Israel and Belgium. He returned to Europe in 2018 after claiming All-NBL First Team honors, playing in Spain and France before returning to Australia to join the 36ers.

== High school career ==
Conger spent three years at Covenant Christian Academy in Cumming, Georgia. He averaged 18 points per game as a junior in 2007–08 en route to leading the Crusaders to a 20–9 record and a National Association of Christian Athletes (NACA) Elite League Championship. As a senior in 2008–09, he averaged 24 points per game and was named to the NACA All-Tournament team.

== College career ==
As a freshman at St. Bonaventure in 2009–10, Conger saw action in 26 games and averaged 3.6 points and 2.7 rebounds in 11.2 minutes of action per outing. He scored a career-high 10 points against Savannah State on December 12 and Temple in the season finale on March 12.

As a sophomore in 2010–11, Conger started all 31 games and was fourth on the team in scoring, averaging 10 points per game. He set a career high for points (23) and minutes played (57) in a quadruple overtime game against Ohio on December 18, 2010.

As a junior in 2011–12, Conger started all 32 games while averaging 12.1 points and 6.2 rebounds per game, which both ranked second on the team to Andrew Nicholson. Conger also led the team with 91 offensive rebounds and 33.5 minutes played per game. On November 27, 2011, he tied a career-high 23 points in a loss to Virginia Tech. He was named A-10 Co-Player of the Week after pacing the Bonnies with 20 points, seven free throws, five assists and four boards over a season-high 38 minutes in a victory against Loyola on December 18, 2011. He turned in his fifth career double-double and first of the season with a career-high 27 points and 11 rebounds against Niagara on December 30, 2011 to help the Bonnies complete its first-ever sweep of the Big Four. In March 2012, Conger helped the Bonnies win the Atlantic 10 tournament while garnering Atlantic 10 All-Tournament Team honors.

As a senior in 2012–13, Conger started all 29 games. He was the only player in the Atlantic 10 who led his team in points (14.3 per game), rebounds (7.1) and assists (3.2) during the season. Out of a total of 1,170 minutes of game time, he played in 1,057 (90.3 percent). On December 31, 2012, he netted a season-high 26 points and led the team with eight rebounds and two blocked shots against Iona. He posted 19 points, connected on 4-of-6 3-pointers, grabbed a team-best seven rebounds and reached 1,000 points and 200 assists for his career against VCU on January 12, 2013. In the Bonnies' season finale on March 9, 2013, Conger had 17 points and six rebounds in a 76–72 loss to Fordham.

Conger finished his four-year career at St. Bonaventure with 1,206 career points (26th all-time), 645 rebounds, 249 assists and 83 steals. He became just the third player all-time with 1,000 points, 500 rebounds and 200 assists. Over his four-year career, he posted 12 double-doubles, including four each in the last three seasons. He had 58 career double-figure point games and nine contests with at least 20 points or more.

== Professional career ==
After going undrafted in the 2013 NBA draft, Conger moved to the Dominican Republic for a seven-game stint with Indios de San Francisco.

On September 11, 2013, Conger signed with Pallacanestro Lucca of the Italian Serie A2 Basket. He parted ways with Lucca in late February 2014 after the team declared bankruptcy. In 23 games for Lucca in 2013–14, he averaged 15.0 points, 6.4 rebounds and 1.3 assists per game. He later had a training stint with Roseto Sharks.

On August 12, 2014, Conger signed with Paffoni Omegna for another stint in the Serie A2 Basket. In 30 games for Omegna, he averaged 13.6 points, 6.3 rebounds and 1.3 assists per game.

On August 19, 2015, Conger signed with Aries Trikala of the Greek Basket League. He left Trikala in early February 2016, and joined Israeli team Hapoel Tel Aviv. In 17 games for Trikala, he averaged 16.3 points, 6.4 rebounds, 1.5 assists and 1.5 steals per game. In 18 games for Tel Aviv, he averaged 7.8 points, 4.4 rebounds and 1.6 assists per game.

On July 27, 2016, Conger signed with Antwerp Giants of the Belgian League. In 42 league games during the 2016–17 season, Conger averaged 11.5 points, 4.2 rebounds and 2.1 assists per game. He also averaged 11.8 points, 4.4 rebounds and 1.8 assists in 12 FIBA Europe Cup games.

On August 11, 2017, Conger signed with the Illawarra Hawks for the 2017–18 NBL season. In 27 games for the Hawks, he averaged 19.7 points, 5.7 rebounds, 2.7 assists and 1.1 steals per game. He subsequently finished second in league MVP voting and earned All-NBL First Team honors. On March 2, 2018, Conger signed with Joventut Badalona of the Spanish Liga ACB.

In July 2018, Conger played for the Boston Celtics in the 2018 Las Vegas Summer League. On August 6, 2018, he signed with French team Le Mans Sarthe Basket. On November 13, 2018, after beginning the season in France, Conger signed with the Adelaide 36ers, returning to the Australian NBL for a second stint. In 19 games played for the 36ers, he averaged 11.7 points, 4.8 rebounds and 2.3 assists per game.

On February 22, 2019, Conger joined Hapoel Jerusalem as an injury cover for Chris Johnson, signing a one-month temporary contract with an option to extend it for the rest of the season. On April 6, 2019, Conger parted ways with Jerusalem after appearing in eight games.

On August 14, 2019, Conger signed a two-year deal with Spanish club Coosur Real Betis. On May 15, 2020, Real Betis parted ways with Conger. He signed with ratiopharm Ulm of the German Basketball Bundesliga on November 24, 2020.

On August 16, 2021, he has signed with Petkim Spor of the Basketbol Süper Ligi (BSL). On November 24, 2021, Conger parted ways with Petkim Spor. On December 28, he signed with Filou Oostende of the BNXT League.

On December 15, 2022, Conger signed with New Taipei CTBC DEA of the T1 League.

On February 21, 2023, New Taipei CTBC DEA terminated Conger's contract.

On February 1, 2023, he signed with Rapid București of the Liga Națională.
