= Kristijan Krajina =

Croatian basketball player (born 1990)

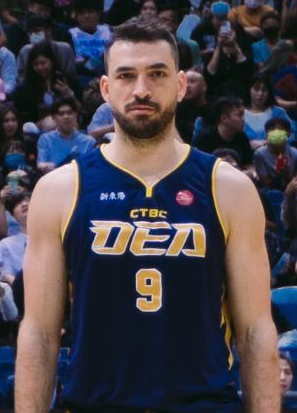
- Krajina in 2023

No. 5 – KK Virtus Zagreb
- Position: Center
- League: Premijer liga

Personal information
- Born: December 28, 1990 (age 35) Osijek, SR Croatia, SFR Yugoslavia
- Listed height: 2.08 m (6 ft 10 in)
- Listed weight: 111 kg (245 lb)

Career information
- College: Mount St. Mary's (2009–2015)
- NBA draft: 2015: undrafted
- Playing career: 2015–present

Career history
- 2015–2016: Šibenik
- 2016–2019: Zadar
- 2019–2020: VEF Rīga
- 2020: CSM U Oradea
- 2020: Cibona
- 2021: Fr ibourg Olympic
- 2021: Phoenix Brussels
- 2021–2022: GTK Gliwice
- 2022–2025: New Taipei CTBC DEA
- 2025: KK Dubrava
- 2025–2026: Kaohsiung Aquas
- 2026–present: KK Virtus Zagreb

Career highlights
- T1 League champion (2023); T1 League All-Star (2023)

Kristijan Krajina (born December 28, 1990) is a Croatian professional basketball player for the KK Virtus Zagreb of the Premijer liga. Standing at 2.08 m (6 ft 10 in), he plays at the center position.

== Early life ==
A native of Osijek, Krajina moved to the United States as a high school senior and spent six years playing college basketball at the Mount St. Mary's University in Maryland.

== Professional career ==
After college, he returned to Croatia to play professional basketball. In August 2015, Krajina signed a one-year contract with Šibenik. After a successful season in Šibenik, he moved to Zadar in June 2016.

On August 19, 2019, he has signed with VEF Rīga of the LEBL. In February 2020, Krajina signed with CSM U Oradea of the Romanian League.

On July 16, 2020, Krajina has signed with Cibona. In November, 2020, his contract with Cibona was terminated.

In February 2021, Krajina signed with Fribourg Olympic of the Swiss Basketball League.

On August 31, 2021, Krajina signed with Phoenix Brussels of the BNXT League. He averaged 10 points, 4.2 rebounds, and 1.5 assists per game. On December 7, 2021, Krajina signed with GTK Gliwice of the Polish Basketball League.

On September 22, 2022, Krajina signed with New Taipei CTBC DEA of the T1 League. On July 24, 2023, Krajina re-signed with the New Taipei CTBC DEA. On August 10, 2024, Krajina re-signed with the New Taipei CTBC DEA of the Taiwan Professional Basketball League (TPBL). On August 25, 2025, the contract was expired.

On September 27, 2025, Krajina signed with the KK Dubrava of the Premijer liga.

On November 23, 2025, Krajina signed with the Kaohsiung Aquas of the Taiwan Professional Basketball League (TPBL).

On July 26, 2026, the Kaohsiung Aquas announced that Krajina left the team. On October 11, Krajina signed with the KK Virtus Zagreb of the Premijer liga.

== Personal life ==
Krajina's younger brother Filip (born 1995) is also a professional basketball player. Krajina has been in a relationship with American-Croatian tennis player Bernarda Pera since 2018.
