= Marcus Weathers =

American basketball player (born 1997)

Free Agent
- Position: Small forward

Personal information
- Born: August 5, 1997 (age 29) Roeland Park, Kansas, U.S.
- Listed height: 6 ft 5 in (1.96 m)
- Listed weight: 215 lb (98 kg)

Career information
- High school: Shawnee Mission North (Overland Park, Kansas)
- College: Miami (Ohio) (2016–2017); Duquesne (2018–2021); SMU (2021–2022)
- NBA draft: 2022: undrafted
- Playing career: 2023–present

Career history
- 2023: NorthPort Batang Pier
- 2023: Tainan TSG GhostHawks
- 2023: Ankaragücü
- 2023–2024: Mornar Bar
- 2024–2025: Trefl Sopot
- 2025: MLP Academics Heidelberg
- 2026: Arka Gdynia

Career highlights
- Second-team All-AAC (2022)

Marcus Joe Weathers (born August 5, 1997) is an American basketball player who last played for Arka Gdynia of the Polish Basketball League (PLK). He played college basketball for the Miami RedHawks, Duquesne University for about three seasons, and spent his last year of eligibility at SMU Mustangs.

== Collegiate career ==
=== SMU Mustangs (2021–2022) ===
As Marcus and his twin brother, Michael, were reunited for almost quite some time, they both believed that this was not the plan they had in mind since they are seriously considering to commence workouts for the NBA G-League. In their first game back together with his twin brother, Marcus dropped 11 points and 7 rebounds in a 86–62 victory over the McNeese State Cowboys. His twin brother, Michael, recorded 9 points and 4 steals in that same game. On January 29, 2022, Marcus scored a season-high 27 points to go along with 9 rebounds in a 69–61 victory over the Temple Owls.

== Professional career ==
In November 2022, Weathers signed with the San Miguel Beermen of the Philippine Basketball Association (PBA) as the team's import for the 2023 PBA Governors' Cup. However, on January 11, 2023, San Miguel selected Cameron Clark as their import instead. Later that day, Weathers signed with the NorthPort Batang Pier, still with the PBA. After playing four games, he was replaced by Kevin Murphy.

On March 6, 2023, Weathers signed with Tainan TSG GhostHawks of the T1 League.

On August 26, 2024, Weathers signed a one year contract with Trefl Sopot of the Polish Basketball League.

On June 15, 2025, Weathers signed with MLP Academics Heidelberg of the Basketball Bundesliga (BBL). On December 29, he was released by the team.

On January 9, 2026, he signed with Arka Gdynia of the Polish Basketball League (PLK).

== Career statistics ==
=== Collegiate ===
Year	Team	GP	GS	MPG	FG%	3P%	FT%	RPG	APG	SPG	BPG	PPG
2018–19	Duquesne	31	30	26.7	.489	.245	.641	6.4	.8	.6	.8	10.0
2019–20	Duquesne	30	30	29.4	.557	.161	.673	8.1	1.7	1.1	1.3	14.3
2020–21	Duquesne	18	18	29.6	.481	.310	.637	7.5	1.5	.9	.7	15.3
2021–22	SMU	33	25	28.1	.507	.333	.714	7.5	1.8	.5	.6	12.8

== Personal life ==
Marcus Weathers was born to Michael Weathers and Joann Loring. He has a fraternal twin brother, Michael Jr., his father's namesake, who was born three minutes before him. The twin brothers were always comfortable when they are in reach of the other. Weathers' father played college basketball for the Drake Bulldogs. Their father, Michael Sr., died from an enlarged heart when they were 5 years old. They have fond memories of him making them breakfast and taking them to the park.
