= Edgaras Želionis =

Lithuanian basketball player (born 1989)

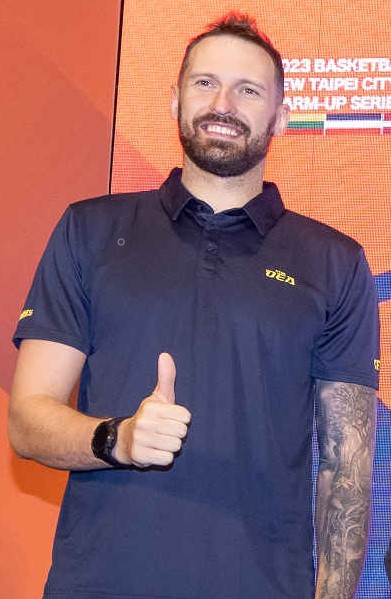
- Želionis in 2023

No. 1 – Calor de Cancún
- Position: Power forward / center
- League: LNBP

Personal information
- Born: 4 June 1989 (age 37) Kaunas, Lithuanian SSR, Soviet Union
- Listed height: 2.08 m (6 ft 10 in)
- Listed weight: 100 kg (220 lb)

Career information
- NBA draft: 2011: undrafted
- Playing career: 2008–present

Career history
- 2008–2010: Khimik
- 2010–2012: Rūdupis Prienai
- 2012–2014: Barsy Atyrau
- 2014–2015: Liepāja
- 2015–2016: Juventus
- 2016–2017: Ventspils
- 2017–2018: Neptūnas Klaipėda
- 2018–2019: Afyon
- 2019: Al Ittihad
- 2019–2020: Al-Wehda
- 2020: ESSM Le Portel
- 2020–2021: Pieno žaigždės Pasvalys
- 2021–2022: Neptūnas Klaipėda
- 2022–2024: New Taipei CTBC DEA
- 2024: Marinos B.B.C.
- 2024: El Calor de Cancún
- 2024–2026: Kaohsiung Aquas
- 2026–present: El Calor de Cancún

Career highlights
- T1 League champion (2023); T1 League All-Star (2023); All-LKL Team (2018)

Edgaras Želionis (born 4 June 1989) is a Lithuanian professional basketball player for El Calor de Cancún of the Liga Nacional de Baloncesto Profesional (LNBP). He plays at the power forward and center positions.

== Professional career ==
On 5 July 2017, Želionis signed with Neptūnas Klaipėda of the Lithuanian Basketball League.

On 10 January 2020, he signed with ESSM Le Portel of the French LNB Pro A.

On 24 July 2021, Želionis returned to Neptūnas Klaipėda.

On 13 September 2022, Želionis signed with New Taipei CTBC DEA of the T1 League. On 21 June 2023, Želionis re-signed with the New Taipei CTBC DEA.

On 27 May 2024, Želionis signed with the Marinos B.B.C. of the Superliga Profesional de Baloncesto (SPB). On December 3, Želionis signed with the Kaohsiung Aquas of the Taiwan Professional Basketball League (TPBL).

On August 1, 2025, Želionis re-signed with the Kaohsiung Aquas of the Taiwan Professional Basketball League (TPBL).

On July 26, 2026, the Kaohsiung Aquas announced that Želionis left the team. On August 8, Želionis returned to the El Calor de Cancún of the Liga Nacional de Baloncesto Profesional.

== National team career ==
Želionis played for the Lithuania national team during 2019 FIBA World Cup qualifiers.
