= Chia Nan University of Pharmacy and Science =

Private university in Tainan, Taiwan

Coordinates: 22°55′15.1″N 120°13′31″E

- 嘉南藥理大學
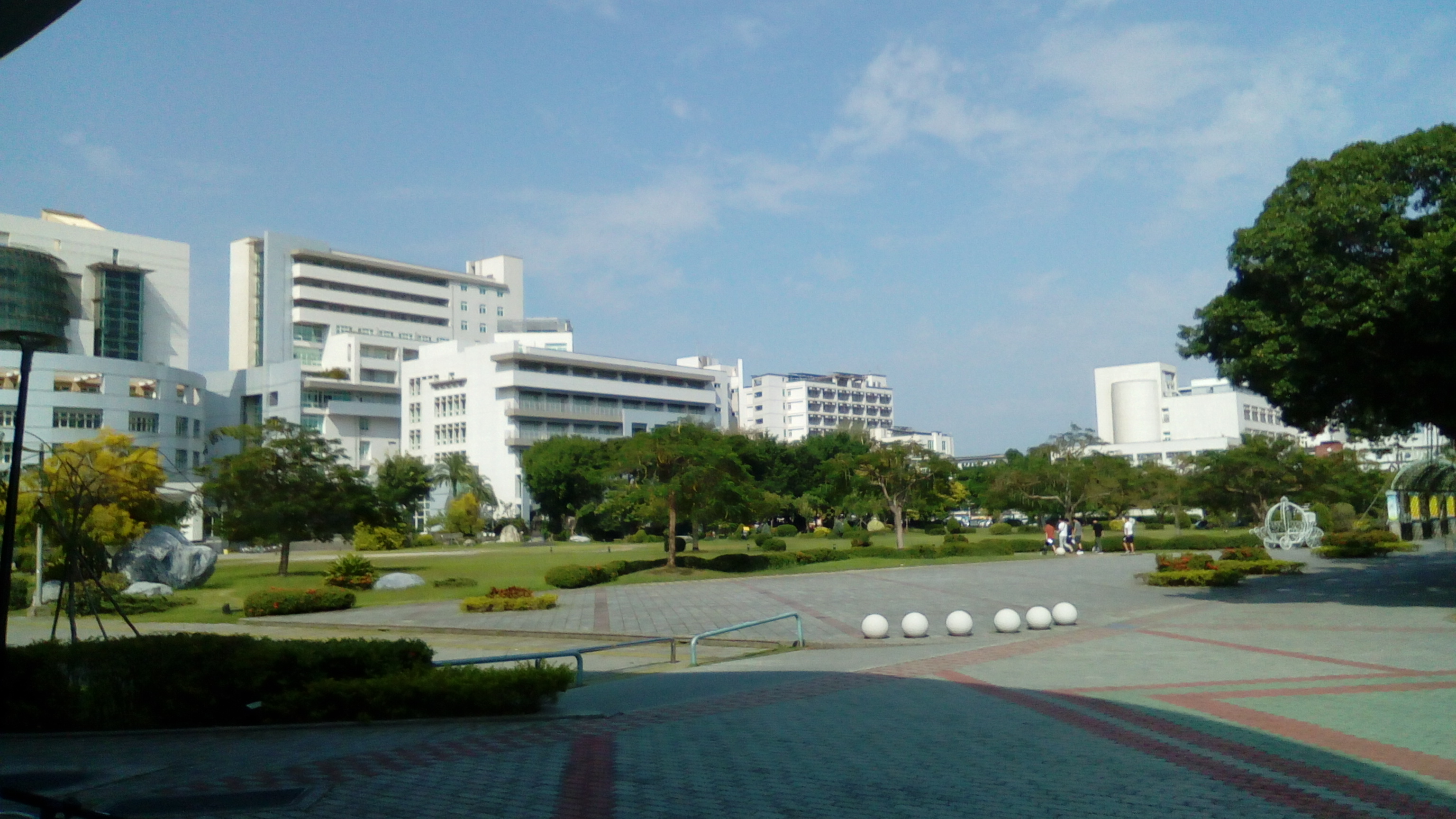
- Motto: Truth
- Type: Private
- Established: 1966
- President: Jih-Ming Chyan (錢紀銘博士）
- Vice-president: Yih-Feng Chang (張翊峰博士）、Jia-Sui Wang（王嘉穗博士）、Ming-Horng Su（蘇銘宏博士）
- Academic staff: 674 (In 2016)
- Students: 16286 (In 2016)
- Location: Rende District, Tainan City, Taiwan
- Website: http://www.cnu.edu.tw/index.asp

Chia Nan University of Pharmacy and Science
- Traditional Chinese: 嘉南藥理大學
Transcriptions
Standard Mandarin
- Hanyu Pinyin: Jiānán Yàolǐ Dàxué
Southern Min
- Hokkien POJ: Ka-lâm Io̍h-lí Tāi-ha̍k

Chia Nan University of Pharmacy and Science (CNU; Chinese: 嘉南藥理大學; pinyin: Jiā Nán Yàolǐ Dàxué) is a private university in Rende District, Tainan City, Taiwan.

The university consists of 28 departments and six colleges: Pharmacy and Science, Human Ecology, Health and Information, Humanities and Social Sciences, Sustainable Environment, and Leisure and Recreation Management. The university has an enrollment of 16,835 students, and more than 500 full-time faculty members.

== History ==
=== Chia Nan College of Pharmacy ===
- March 1966, Chia Nan College of Pharmacy was established, with Department of Pharmacy (six years).
- 1969, additional Department of Healthcare Pharmacy.
- 1970, additional Department of Pharmacy (two years).
- 1973, Department of Pharmacy (two years) stop recruiting.
- 1976, Department of Healthcare Pharmacy stop recruiting.
- 1976, additional Department of Applied Chemistry (five years) and Department of Industrial Safety (five years). Department of Applied Chemistry divided into the Group of Farm Pharmaceutical and the Group of Cosmetic.
- 1980, additional Department of Food Hygiene (five years).
- 1982, Department of Applied Chemistry cancel the Group of Farm Pharmaceutical and the Group of Cosmetic. Additional Department of Industrial Safety and Health for Night School (two years).
- 1987, additional Department of Food Hygiene for Night School (two years).
- 1988, additional Department of Applied Chemistry for Night School (two years), Department of Applied Chemistry (two years) and Department of Medical Management (five years).
- 1990, additional Department of Applied Chemistry (two years) and Department of Environmental Engineering Safety (two years).
- 1991, additional Department of Environmental Engineering Safety for Night School (two years).
- 1992, additional Department of Environmental Engineering Safety (five years) and Department of Pharmacy for Training Division (three years)
- 1993, additional Department of Applied Cosmetic and Management (two years).
- 1994, additional Department of Children Nursery (two years).

=== Chia Nan College of Pharmacy and Science ===
- August 1996, reform to Chia Nan College of Pharmacy and Science.
- 1997, Department of Applied Chemistry renamed to Department of Medicinal Chemistry.
- 1998, additional Department of Information Management and Department of Health and Nutrition, Department of Children Nursery renamed to Department of Childhood Education and Nursery.
- 1999, additional Department of Applied Life Science and Health, Department of Teenagers and Children Welfare and Department of Recreation and Healthcare Management. Set the educational program.

=== Chia Nan University of Pharmacy and Science (2000~present) ===
New Department / Master Program	Establishment Time
Department of Hotel and Restaurant Management Master Program in Biotechnology Master Program in Environment Engineering and Science	2001
Department of Applied Foreign Languages	2002
Department of Biotechnology Department of Environment Resources Management	2003
Department of Cultural Activities Development Master Program in Medical Informatics Management	2004
Department of Tourism and Management Master Program in Pharmaceutical Technology	2005
Department of Sports Management Master Program in Health and Nutrition	2006
Master Program in Industrial Safety and Disaster Prevention Master Program in Hot Spring Industry	2007
Department of Senior Citizen Service Management Department of Applied Geoinformatics Master Program in Recreation and Geoinformatics	2008
Department of Information Technology	2009
Bachelor Program in Childhood Industry Service	2011
Master Program in Applied Geoinformatics	2013
Postgraduate Bachelor Program in Public Safety and Fire Science	2015
Bachelor Program in Pharmaceutical Botanical and Health Applications Bachelor Program in Cosmeceutical and Biotech Industry	2016
Bachelor Program in Public Safety and Fire Science	2017
Bachelor Program in Digital Service for Smart Healthcare	2018

== Academics ==
=== College of Pharmacy and Science ===
Department of Pharmacy (with Master's program)
Department of Biotechnology (with Master's program)
Department of Medicinal Chemistry
Department of Cosmetic Science (with Master's program)
Bachelor Program in Pharmaceutical Botanical and Health Applications
Bachelor Program in Cosmeceutical and Biotech Industry
Industry-Academia Cooperation Center for Herb Development and Health Promotion
Institute of Cosmetic Science
Functional Cosmetics Development and Evaluation Research Center
Drug Discovery and Development Center

=== College of Human Ecology ===
Department of Food Science and Technology
Department of Health and Nutrition (with Master's program)
Department of Applied Life Science and Health
Department of Hotel and Restaurant Management
Department of Childhood Education and Nursery

=== College of Humanities and Applied Information ===
Department of Applied Foreign Languages
Department of Social Work
Department of Information Management
Department of Applied Informatics and Multimedia
Bachelor Program in Digital Service for Smart Healthcare
Institute of Confucianism

=== College of Sustainable Environment ===
Department of Occupational Safety and Health
Department of Environment Engineering and Science (with Master's program)
Department of Environmental Resources Management (with Master's program)
Department of Applied Geoinformatics (with Master's program)
Bachelor Program in Public Safety and Fire Science
Institute of Industrial Safety and Disaster Prevention

=== College of Recreation and Health Management ===
Department of Recreation and Healthcare Management (with Master's program)
Department of Tourism and Management (with Master's Program in Hot Spring Industry)
Department of Sports Management
Department of Hospital and Healthcare Administration (with Master's program)
Department of Senior Citizen Service Management
Institute of Hot Spring Industry

=== Center of General Education ===
Museum of Culture and Arts
Foreign Language and Literature Center
Center of General Education

== Transportation ==
=== Taiwan Railway West Coast Line ===
- Bao'an Station (1.7 km)
- Rende Station (2.0 km)

=== Bus ===
==== Tainan City Bus ====
Serial number	Route	Intermediate Stop
5	Heshun Bus Station－Tainan Municipal Hospital/Dajia Village	Chia Nan University of Pharmacy & Science
32	The Indigenous Culture Museum－THSR Tainan Station	Chia Nan University of Pharmacy & Science
Red 3	Tainan Bus Station－Guanmiao Bus Station	Chia Nan University of Pharmacy & Science

==== Kaohsiung City Bus ====
Serial number	Route	Intermediate Stop
239	Cieding－Tainan Train Station	Chia Nan University of Pharmancy & Science
8041C	Fongshan－Cieding	Chia Nan University of Pharmancy & Science
8046A	THSR Zuoying Station－Tainan Train Station	Chia Nan University of Pharmancy & Science
8046B	THSR Zuoying Station－Tainan Train Station	Chia Nan University of Pharmancy & Science

=== Tainan City Public Bicycle Rental System ===
- February 17, 2017, Chia Nan University of Pharmacy and Science Chia Nan University of Pharmacy and Sciencedonate rental T-Bike station and public bicycles, CNU become first private donation agencies on Tainan City. Chia Nan University Station was set up immediately, total 32 bicycles and lock devices, provide students and residents round trip to Bao'an Station and school.
- February 23, 2023, Tainan City Government replaced the public bicycle system from T-Bike to YouBike. March 24, 2023, Chia Nan University of Pharmacy and Science station began operation, total 69 docking posts were provided.

=== Kaohsiung MRT ===
- In 2016, Kaohsiung City Government Mass Rapid Transit Bureau announced Chih-Mei Extension Line, code CM. This route length 7.05 km, start from Gangshan Lujhu Line Dahu Station, along Provincial Highway 1, through Hunei District at Kaohsiung City, Rende District at Tainan City and Chia Nan University of Pharmacy and Science, terminal station plan to set in front Chih-Mei Museum main entrance. But this route not yet audited by the Executive Yuan, so it's not sure whether to build.

== See also ==
- List of universities in Taiwan
