= Taipei Physical Education College =

The Taipei Physical Education College (Chinese: 台北市立體育學院; pinyin: Táiběi Shìlì Tǐyù Xuéyuàn) was a college in Taipei, Taiwan. Since its merger with Taipei Municipal University of Education, it became the Tianmu Campus of the University of Taipei (Chinese: 臺北市立大學天母校區; pinyin: Táiběi Shìlì Dàxué Tiānmǔ Xiàoqū) in Shilin, Taipei.

== History ==
The campus was originally founded as Taipei Physical Education College in 1968. In August 2013, it was merged with Taipei Municipal University of Education to form the University of Taipei.
