= 2022–23 T1 League regular season =

2nd T1 League regular season

T1 League
- Season: 2022–23
- Duration: October 29, 2022 – April 23, 2023
- Games played: 30 per team
- Teams: 6

Regular season
- Season MVP: Mohammad Al Bachir Gadiaga (DEA)

Statistical leaders
Points	Michael Efevberha (Leopards)	28.7
Rebounds	Dwight Howard (Leopards)	16.2
Assists	Lin Wei-Han (DEA)	10.0

Records
- Biggest home win: Leopards 65–108 GhostHawks (April 15, 2023)
- Biggest away win: DEA 112–75 HeroBears (January 2, 2023)
- Highest scoring: Leopards 137–116 Aquas (February 12, 2023)
- Lowest scoring: Leopards 65–108 GhostHawks (April 15, 2023)
- Winning streak: 13 games DEA
- Losing streak: 10 games Leopards
- All statistics correct as of April 23, 2023.

The 2022–23 T1 League regular season was the second regular season of T1 League. Participating teams included the Kaohsiung Aquas, New Taipei CTBC DEA, Taichung Suns, Tainan TSG GhostHawks, TaiwanBeer HeroBears, and the Taoyuan Leopards. Each team plays against another six times, three at home and three on the road, respectively, led to 30 matches in total. The regular season started on October 29, 2022, and ended on April 23, 2023. The 2022–23 season opening game, matched by the Kaohsiung Aquas and the New Taipei CTBC DEA, was played at Xinzhuang Gymnasium.

== League table ==
Pos	Team	Pld	W	L	PCT	GB	Qualification
1	New Taipei CTBC DEA	30	25	5	.833	—	Advance to semifinals
2	Tainan TSG GhostHawks	30	19	11	.633	6	Advance to semifinals
3	Kaohsiung Aquas	30	16	14	.533	9	Advance to semifinals
4	TaiwanBeer HeroBears	30	16	14	.533	9	Advance to play-in
5	Taichung Suns	30	8	22	.267	17	Advance to play-in
6	Taoyuan Leopards	30	6	24	.200	19	

Source: T1 League

=== Head to head ===
Home \ Away	HEROBEARS	DEA	LEOPARDS	SUNS	GHOSTHAWKS	AQUAS
TaiwanBeer HeroBears	—	1–2	2–1	2–1	2–1	2–1
New Taipei CTBC DEA	3–0	—	3–0	3–0	3–0	3–0
Taoyuan Leopards	0–3	1–2	—	0–3	1–2	1–2
Taichung Suns	0–3	1–2	2–1	—	1–2	0–3
Tainan TSG GhostHawks	3–0	0–3	3–0	3–0	—	3–0
Kaohsiung Aquas	2–1	2–1	2–1	3–0	1–2	—

Source: T1 League
Legend: Blue = home team win; Red = away team win.
Matches with lighter background shading were decided after overtime.

== Matches ==
=== Matchweek 1 (opening match) ===
October 29, 2022 Regular #01	Kaohsiung Aquas	87–109	New Taipei CTBC DEA	New Taipei City
14:00 (UTC+8)	Scoring by quarter: 14–25, 25–31, 22–30, 26–23
	Pts: Kupšas 18; Rebs: Kupšas 15; Asts: Kupšas, Chen Huai-An 3	boxscore	Pts: Želionis 22; Rebs: Želionis, Krajina 6 Asts: Lin Wei-Han 9	Arena: Xinzhuang Gymnasium; Attendance: 5,652; Referees: Yu Jung, Lin Chien-Hung, Hsieh Shang-Chien

October 30, 2022 Regular #02	Tainan TSG GhostHawks	98–101	New Taipei CTBC DEA	New Taipei City
14:00 (UTC+8)	Scoring by quarter: 25–27, 25–24, 23–25, 25–25
	Pts: Deguara 32; Rebs: Deguara 19; Asts: Braun 5	boxscore	Pts: Želionis 20; Rebs: Krajina, Lin Ping-Sheng 7 Asts: Lin Wei-Han 12	Arena: Xinzhuang Gymnasium; Attendance: 3,939; Referees: Wu Chien-Wu, Lan Wei-Hsiung, Chen Chien-Lin

=== Matchweek 2 ===
November 5, 2022 Regular #03	Kaohsiung Aquas	99–79	Taichung Suns	Taichung City
14:00 (UTC+8)	Scoring by quarter: 29–16, 18–21, 26–17, 26–25
	Pts: Hu Long-Mao 27; Rebs: Kupšas 8 Asts: Brickman 11	boxscore	Pts: Bishop 22; Rebs: Bishop, Geramipoor 9 Asts: Lu Kuan-Hsuan 8	Arena: National Taiwan University of Sport Gymnasium; Attendance: 2,425; Referees: Yu Jung, Lai Chien-Hao, Huang Ho-Yung

November 6, 2022 Regular #04	New Taipei CTBC DEA	109–112	Taichung Suns	Taichung City
14:00 (UTC+8)	Scoring by quarter: 20–32, 29–28, 29–22, 31–30
	Pts: Želionis 25; Rebs: Bachir, Krajina 7 Asts: Lin Wei-Han 11	boxscore	Pts: Stone 29; Rebs: Bishop, Geramipoor 10; Asts: Lu Kuan-Hsuan 8	Arena: National Taiwan University of Sport Gymnasium; Attendance: 2,861; Referees: Lin Chien-Hung, Huang Yung-Chu, Chen Ming-Ling

=== Matchweek 3 ===
November 12, 2022 Regular #05	New Taipei CTBC DEA	107–104	Tainan TSG GhostHawks	Tainan City
14:00 (UTC+8)	Scoring by quarter: 26–33, 32–22, 28–26, 21–23
	Pts: Bachir 28; Rebs: Bachir 12; Asts: Lin Wei-Han 6	boxscore	Pts: Deguara 27; Rebs: Upshaw 8 Asts: Hu Kai-Hsiang 6	Arena: Chia Nan University of Pharmacy and Science Shao Tsung Gymnasium; Attendance: 2,200; Referees: Huang Yung-Chu, Lai Chien-Hao, Wu Pei-Jung

November 12, 2022 Regular #06	Kaohsiung Aquas	111–101	TaiwanBeer HeroBears	Taipei City
16:30 (UTC+8)	Scoring by quarter: 20–23, 34–27, 30–25, 27–26
	Pts: Kupšas 33; Rebs: Bohannon 11; Asts: Brickman 10	boxscore	Pts: Dawson 27; Rebs: Dawson 10; Asts: Tsao Xun-Xiang 6	Arena: University of Taipei Tianmu Campus Gymnasium; Attendance: 3,129; Referees: Wu Chien-Wu, Hsieh Shang-Chien, Chien Chun-Yen

November 13, 2022 Regular #07	Taoyuan Leopards	100–114	Tainan TSG GhostHawks	Tainan City
14:00 (UTC+8)	Scoring by quarter: 34–32, 18–39, 26–22, 22–21
	Pts: Williams 36; Rebs: Davis 20; Asts: Williams, Cheng Wei 5	boxscore	Pts: Deguara, Ku Mao Wei-Chia 20; Rebs: Upshaw 10; Asts: Braun 6	Arena: Chia Nan University of Pharmacy and Science Shao Tsung Gymnasium; Attendance: 1,857; Referees: Lin Chien-Hung, Chan Yi-Cheng, Ou Yang Cheng-Te

November 13, 2022 Regular #08	Taichung Suns	94–109	TaiwanBeer HeroBears	Taipei City
16:30 (UTC+8)	Scoring by quarter: 27–22, 27–35, 26–23, 14–29
	Pts: Stone 24; Rebs: Bishop 16; Asts: Bayasgalan 6	boxscore	Pts: Chu I-Tsung 30; Rebs: Dawson 14; Asts: Tsao Xun-Xiang 12	Arena: University of Taipei Tianmu Campus Gymnasium; Attendance: 2,156; Referees: Lan Wei-Hsiung, Chen Chien-Lin, Liu Nai-Wei

=== Matchweek 4 ===
November 19, 2022 Regular #09	New Taipei CTBC DEA	115–120(OT)	Taoyuan Leopards	Taoyuan City
16:30 (UTC+8)	Scoring by quarter: 40–28, 32–23, 19–28, 14–26, Overtime: 10–15
	Pts: Bachir 51; Rebs: Krajina 15; Asts: Lin Wei-Han 11	boxscore	Pts: Howard 38; Rebs: Howard 25; Asts: Howard 9	Arena: National Taiwan Sport University Arena; Attendance: 15,000; Referees: Wu Chien-Wu, Huang Po-Wei, Hsieh Chieh-Lung

November 20, 2022 Regular #10	Taichung Suns	103–94	Taoyuan Leopards	Taoyuan City
16:30 (UTC+8)	Scoring by quarter: 23–32, 31–19, 26–24, 23–19
	Pts: Stone 29; Rebs: Bishop 14; Asts: Bayasgalan 7	boxscore	Pts: Williams 28; Rebs: Williams 13; Asts: Howard 10	Arena: National Taiwan Sport University Arena; Attendance: 15,537; Referees: Lan Wei-Hsiung, Chan Yi-Cheng, Chien Chun-Yen

=== Matchweek 5 ===
November 26, 2022 Regular #11	Tainan TSG GhostHawks	93–96	Taichung Suns	Taichung City
14:00 (UTC+8)	Scoring by quarter: 27–26, 21–17, 15–30, 30–23
	Pts: Deguara 25; Rebs: Deguara 10; Asts: Li Han-Sheng 7	boxscore	Pts: Bishop 26; Rebs: Bishop 14; Asts: Bishop 6	Arena: National Taiwan University of Sport Gymnasium; Attendance: 1,831; Referees: Lin Chien-Hung, Huang Ho-Yung, Chen Ming-Ling

November 26, 2022 Regular #12	New Taipei CTBC DEA	81–105	Kaohsiung Aquas	Kaohsiung City
16:30 (UTC+8)	Scoring by quarter: 19–30, 22–17, 13–27, 27–31
	Pts: Bachir, Želionis 17; Rebs: Želionis 10; Asts: Lin Wei-Han 6	boxscore	Pts: Brickman 24; Rebs: Kupšas 14; Asts: Brickman 7	Arena: Kaohsiung Arena; Attendance: 10,823; Referees: Yu Jung, Hsieh Shang-Chien, Lin Yu-Hsuan

November 27, 2022 Regular #13	Taoyuan Leopards	87–93	Taichung Suns	Taichung City
14:00 (UTC+8)	Scoring by quarter: 30–26, 16–21, 16–23, 25–23
	Pts: Williams 32; Rebs: Davis 22; Asts: Williams 5	boxscore	Pts: Stone 37; Rebs: Stone 20; Asts: Lu Kuan-Hsuan 8	Arena: National Taiwan University of Sport Gymnasium; Attendance: 5,861; Referees: Wu Chien-Wu, Lai Chien-Hao, Huang Yu-Ming

November 27, 2022 Regular #14	TaiwanBeer HeroBears	98–97	Kaohsiung Aquas	Kaohsiung City
16:30 (UTC+8)	Scoring by quarter: 20–23, 35–35, 24–26, 19–13
	Pts: Early 31; Rebs: Dawson 17; Asts: Dawson 6	boxscore	Pts: Kupšas 27; Rebs: Kupšas 12; Asts: Brickman 7	Arena: Kaohsiung Arena; Attendance: 6,071; Referees: Yu Jung, Huang Yung-Chu, Kao Ta-Wei

=== Matchweek 6 ===
December 3, 2022 Regular #15	Taichung Suns	90–120	Kaohsiung Aquas	Kaohsiung City
14:00 (UTC+8)	Scoring by quarter: 29–22, 21–30, 13–28, 27–40
	Pts: Stone 27; Rebs: Bishop 12; Asts: Peng Chun-Yen 5	boxscore	Pts: Brickman 21; Rebs: Kupšas 12; Asts: Brickman 11	Arena: Kaohsiung Arena; Attendance: 2,486; Referees: Lin Chien-Hung, Ou Yang Cheng-Te, Kao Ta-Wei

December 3, 2022 Regular #16	New Taipei CTBC DEA	117–103	TaiwanBeer HeroBears	Taipei City
16:30 (UTC+8)	Scoring by quarter: 30–26, 24–30, 33–25, 30–22
	Pts: Bachir 25; Rebs: Krajina 11; Asts: Lin Wei-Han 11	boxscore	Pts: Early 28; Rebs: Dawson 17; Asts: Chiang Yu-An 7	Arena: University of Taipei Tianmu Campus Gymnasium; Attendance: 3,168; Referees: Wu Chien-Wu, Hsieh Shang-Chien, Hsieh Chieh-Lung

December 4, 2022 Regular #17	Taoyuan Leopards	109–130	Kaohsiung Aquas	Kaohsiung City
14:00 (UTC+8)	Scoring by quarter: 25–40, 24–26, 29–33, 31–31
	Pts: Williams 37; Rebs: Davis 8 Asts: Williams 7	boxscore	Pts: Chiu Tzu-Hsuan 31; Rebs: Kupšas 19; Asts: Brickman 13	Arena: Kaohsiung Arena; Attendance: 12,460; Referees: Lan Wei-Hsiung, Huang Yung-Chu, Liu Nai-Wei

December 4, 2022 Regular #18	Tainan TSG GhostHawks	108–112	TaiwanBeer HeroBears	Taipei City
16:30 (UTC+8)	Scoring by quarter: 24–27, 27–26, 30–31, 27–28
	Pts: Upshaw 30; Rebs: Deguara 16; Asts: Braun 8	boxscore	Pts: Early 56; Rebs: Veljković 13; Asts: Early 7	Arena: University of Taipei Tianmu Campus Gymnasium; Attendance: 2,226; Referees: Hsieh Shang-Chien, Chan Yi-Cheng, Lai Chien-Hao

=== Matchweek 7 ===
December 10, 2022 Regular #19	TaiwanBeer HeroBears	99–120	Tainan TSG GhostHawks	Tainan City
14:00 (UTC+8)	Scoring by quarter: 18–35, 29–31, 30–32, 22–22
	Pts: Early 33; Rebs: Chou Po-Hsun 7 Asts: Chiang Yu-An, Early 5	boxscore	Pts: Deguara 30; Rebs: Upshaw 12; Asts: Hu Kai-Hsiang 8	Arena: Chia Nan University of Pharmacy and Science Shao Tsung Gymnasium; Attendance: 1,023; Referees: Wu Chien-Wu, Lin Chien-Hung, Lin Yu-Hsuan

December 11, 2022 Regular #20	Kaohsiung Aquas	118–119(2OT)	Tainan TSG GhostHawks	Tainan City
14:00 (UTC+8)	Scoring by quarter: 21–28, 33–22, 25–31, 19–17, Overtime: 20–21
	Pts: Kupšas 30; Rebs: Kupšas 12; Asts: Brickman 13	boxscore	Pts: Ku Mao Wei-Chia 24; Rebs: Deguara 14; Asts: Li Han-Sheng 10	Arena: Chia Nan University of Pharmacy and Science Shao Tsung Gymnasium; Attendance: 1,051; Referees: Yu Jung, Wu Pei-Jung, Liu Nai-Wei

=== Matchweek 8 ===
December 16, 2022 Regular #21	Tainan TSG GhostHawks	87–78	Taoyuan Leopards	Taoyuan City
19:00 (UTC+8)	Scoring by quarter: 25–18, 25–20, 23–25, 14–15
	Pts: Upshaw 19; Rebs: Deguara 12; Asts: Li Han-Sheng 6	boxscore	Pts: Howard 21; Rebs: Łapeta 16; Asts: Lu Chieh-Min 4	Arena: National Taiwan Sport University Arena; Attendance: 15,050; Referees: Lin Chien-Hung, Hsieh Shang-Chien, Chen Chien-Lin

December 17, 2022 Regular #22	TaiwanBeer HeroBears	92–80	Taichung Suns	Taichung City
14:00 (UTC+8)	Scoring by quarter: 25–22, 20–17, 19–19, 28–22
	Pts: Early 38; Rebs: Early 11; Asts: Early 6	boxscore	Pts: Geramipoor 17; Rebs: Bishop, Geramipoor 10; Asts: Bishop 9	Arena: National Taiwan University of Sport Gymnasium; Attendance: 1,813; Referees: Wu Chien-Wu, Huang Po-Wei, Huang Yu-Ming

December 17, 2022 Regular #23	Taoyuan Leopards	94–103	New Taipei CTBC DEA	New Taipei City
16:30 (UTC+8)	Scoring by quarter: 21–23, 27–23, 23–40, 23–17
	Pts: Lu Chieh-Min 34; Rebs: Łapeta 12; Asts: Lin Yi-Huei 5	boxscore	Pts: Želionis 31; Rebs: Lin Wei-Han 11; Asts: Lin Wei-Han 12	Arena: Xinzhuang Gymnasium; Attendance: 6,540; Referees: Yu Jung, Huang Yung-Chu, Wu Pei-Jung

December 18, 2022 Regular #24	Kaohsiung Aquas	93–89	Taoyuan Leopards	Taoyuan City
14:00 (UTC+8)	Scoring by quarter: 21–24, 27–23, 24–20, 21–22
	Pts: Kupšas 20; Rebs: Brickman 12; Asts: Brickman 11	boxscore	Pts: Efevberha 31; Rebs: Efevberha 13; Asts: Efevberha 6	Arena: National Taiwan Sport University Arena; Attendance: 15,085; Referees: Yu Jung, Lai Chien-Hao, Lin Yu-Hsuan

December 18, 2022 Regular #25	Tainan TSG GhostHawks	93–101	New Taipei CTBC DEA	New Taipei City
16:30 (UTC+8)	Scoring by quarter: 19–32, 30–21, 20–16, 24–32
	Pts: Hu Kai-Hsiang 19; Rebs: Bhullar 12; Asts: Hu Kai-Hsiang, Upshaw 5	boxscore	Pts: Krajina 21; Rebs: Conger 12; Asts: Lin Wei-Han 10	Arena: Xinzhuang Gymnasium; Attendance: 3,108; Referees: Lan Wei-Hsiung, Hsieh Chieh-Lung, Chien Chun-Yen

=== Matchweek 9 ===
December 24, 2022 Regular #26	Taoyuan Leopards	96–105	Tainan TSG GhostHawks	Tainan City
14:00 (UTC+8)	Scoring by quarter: 29–24, 24–28, 28–27, 15–26
	Pts: Efevberha 43; Rebs: Łapeta 12; Asts: Lin Yi-Huei 7	boxscore	Pts: Upshaw 27; Rebs: Upshaw 14; Asts: Li Han-Sheng 10	Arena: Chia Nan University of Pharmacy and Science Shao Tsung Gymnasium; Attendance: 2,200; Referees: Wu Chien-Wu, Wu Pei-Jung, Ou Yang Cheng-Te

December 24, 2022 Regular #27	Kaohsiung Aquas	85–93	New Taipei CTBC DEA	New Taipei City
16:30 (UTC+8)	Scoring by quarter: 27–23, 26–33, 11–13, 21–24
	Pts: Kupšas 26; Rebs: Hu Long-Mao, Bohannon 9 Asts: Brickman 11	boxscore	Pts: Bachir 27; Rebs: Želionis 18; Asts: Wei Chia-Hao 6	Arena: Xinzhuang Gymnasium; Attendance: 3,495; Referees: Yu Jung, Chan Yi-Cheng, Chien Chun-Yen

December 25, 2022 Regular #28	Taichung Suns	95–106	Tainan TSG GhostHawks	Tainan City
14:00 (UTC+8)	Scoring by quarter: 21–20, 26–28, 22–33, 26–25
	Pts: Bishop 33; Rebs: Bishop 12; Asts: Bishop 6	boxscore	Pts: Lu Kuan-Ting 27; Rebs: Bhullar 11; Asts: Li Han-Sheng 6	Arena: Chia Nan University of Pharmacy and Science Shao Tsung Gymnasium; Attendance: 1,013; Referees: Yu Jung, Kao Ta-Wei, Liu Nai-Wei

December 25, 2022 Regular #29	TaiwanBeer HeroBears	81–88	New Taipei CTBC DEA	New Taipei City
16:30 (UTC+8)	Scoring by quarter: 14–23, 22–25, 26–19, 19–21
	Pts: Dawson 23; Rebs: Dawson 17; Asts: Chiang Yu-An 6	boxscore	Pts: Želionis 25; Rebs: Želionis 16; Asts: Lin Ping-Sheng 6	Arena: Xinzhuang Gymnasium; Attendance: 3,401; Referees: Lin Chien-Hung, Hsieh Shang-Chien, Chen Ming-Ling

=== Matchweek 10 ===
December 31, 2022 Regular #30	Kaohsiung Aquas	100–92	Taichung Suns	Taichung City
14:00 (UTC+8)	Scoring by quarter: 28–26, 21–23, 23–23, 28–20
	Pts: Hu Long-Mao 20; Rebs: Hu Long-Mao, Bohannon 14; Asts: Brickman 11	boxscore	Pts: Bishop 26; Rebs: three players 9 Asts: Bayasgalan 6	Arena: National Taiwan University of Sport Gymnasium; Attendance: 1,518; Referees: Yu Jung, Huang Yung-Chu, Chen Chien-Lin

January 1, 2023 Regular #31	Tainan TSG GhostHawks	109–112	TaiwanBeer HeroBears	Taipei City
16:30 (UTC+8)	Scoring by quarter: 28–33, 29–23, 32–24, 20–32
	Pts: Deguara 30; Rebs: Deguara, Bhullar 14; Asts: Li Han-Sheng 9	boxscore	Pts: Lee Chi-Wei 33; Rebs: Dawson 15; Asts: Chiang Yu-An 10	Arena: University of Taipei Tianmu Campus Gymnasium; Attendance: 2,075; Referees: Wu Chien-Wu, Hsieh Shang-Chien, Ou Yang Cheng-Te

January 2, 2023 Regular #32	Taoyuan Leopards	71–96	Taichung Suns	Taichung City
14:00 (UTC+8)	Scoring by quarter: 20–25, 13–24, 19–19, 19–28
	Pts: Łapeta 21; Rebs: Łapeta 17; Asts: Lu Chieh-Min, Chen Hsiao-Jung 3	boxscore	Pts: Bishop 27; Rebs: Bishop 16; Asts: Bayasgalan 6	Arena: National Taiwan University of Sport Gymnasium; Attendance: 5,328; Referees: Yu Jung, Lai Chien-Hao, Chen Ming-Ling

January 2, 2023 Regular #33	New Taipei CTBC DEA	112–75	TaiwanBeer HeroBears	Taipei City
16:30 (UTC+8)	Scoring by quarter: 33–23, 22–19, 33–22, 24–11
	Pts: Bachir, Hsieh Ya-Hsuan 22; Rebs: Krajina 11; Asts: Lin Ping-Sheng 11	boxscore	Pts: Dawson 22; Rebs: Ibeh 12; Asts: Chiang Yu-An 6	Arena: University of Taipei Tianmu Campus Gymnasium; Attendance: 2,323; Referees: Lin Chien-Hung, Lan Wei-Hsiung, Liu Nai-Wei

=== Matchweek 11 ===
January 7, 2023 Regular #34	Tainan TSG GhostHawks	101–92	Kaohsiung Aquas	Kaohsiung City
17:00 (UTC+8)	Scoring by quarter: 21–27, 27–25, 31–17, 22–23
	Pts: Ku Mao Wei-Chia 19; Rebs: Deguara 15; Asts: Upshaw 6	boxscore	Pts: Kupšas 22; Rebs: Kupšas 9 Asts: Brickman 11	Arena: Kaohsiung Arena; Attendance: 3,128; Referees: Wu Chien-Wu, Lin Chien-Hung, Huang Po-Wei

January 7, 2023 Regular #35	Taichung Suns	89–105	TaiwanBeer HeroBears	Taipei City
19:30 (UTC+8)	Scoring by quarter: 22–28, 19–25, 32–19, 16–33
	Pts: Geramipoor 22; Rebs: Geramipoor 13; Asts: Su Yi-Chin 6	boxscore	Pts: Jones 29; Rebs: Dawson, Ibeh 9 Asts: Jones 7	Arena: University of Taipei Tianmu Campus Gymnasium; Attendance: 1,093; Referees: Yu Jung, Chan Yi-Cheng, Chien Chun-Yen

January 8, 2023 Regular #36	New Taipei CTBC DEA	87–105	Kaohsiung Aquas	Kaohsiung City
14:00 (UTC+8)	Scoring by quarter: 27–23, 23–20, 11–19, 26–43
	Pts: Bachir, Conger 19; Rebs: Krajina, Conger 10; Asts: Krajina 6	boxscore	Pts: Kupšas 21; Rebs: Kupšas 11; Asts: Brickman 9	Arena: Kaohsiung Arena; Attendance: 5,495; Referees: Yu Jung, Chen Chien-Lin, Hsieh Chieh-Lung

January 8, 2023 Regular #37	Taoyuan Leopards	111–114	TaiwanBeer HeroBears	Taipei City
16:30 (UTC+8)	Scoring by quarter: 31–35, 26–28, 27–29, 27–22
	Pts: Efevberha 41; Rebs: Efevberha 12; Asts: Efevberha 7	boxscore	Pts: Tsao Xun-Xiang 25; Rebs: Dawson, Tsao Xun-Xiang 7 Asts: six players 3	Arena: University of Taipei Tianmu Campus Gymnasium; Attendance: 4,396; Referees: Wu Chien-Wu, Hsieh Shang-Chien, Huang Yu-Ming

=== Matchweek 12 ===
Postponed (Note: The match, originally scheduled for January 14, 2023, was postponed due to the Taichung Suns could not reach the minimum player number.) Regular #38	Taichung Suns	vs.	Kaohsiung Aquas	Kaohsiung City
	Scoring by quarter: –, –, –, –
		boxscore		Arena: Kaohsiung Arena

January 14, 2023 Regular #39	New Taipei CTBC DEA	116–111	Tainan TSG GhostHawks	Tainan City
16:30 (UTC+8)	Scoring by quarter: 32–33, 27–31, 21–27, 36–20
	Pts: Želionis 29; Rebs: Želionis 15; Asts: Lin Ping-Sheng 7	boxscore	Pts: Bhullar 26; Rebs: Upshaw 20; Asts: Hu Kai-Hsiang 7	Arena: Chia Nan University of Pharmacy and Science Shao Tsung Gymnasium; Attendance: 1,100; Referees: Lin Chien-Hung, Chen Chien-Lin, Kao Ta-Wei

January 15, 2023 Regular #40	Taoyuan Leopards	87–101	Kaohsiung Aquas	Kaohsiung City
14:00 (UTC+8)	Scoring by quarter: 15–24, 25–22, 24–35, 23–20
	Pts: Efevberha 33; Rebs: Howard 13; Asts: Howard 4	boxscore	Pts: Brickman 21; Rebs: Bohannon 16; Asts: Brickman 10	Arena: Kaohsiung Arena; Attendance: 13,179; Referees: Wu Chien-Wu, Lai Chien-Hao, Chien Chun-Yen

January 15, 2023 Regular #41	TaiwanBeer HeroBears	102–105	Tainan TSG GhostHawks	Tainan City
16:30 (UTC+8)	Scoring by quarter: 23–26, 19–34, 28–30, 32–15
	Pts: Tsao Xun-Xiang 24; Rebs: Dawson 13; Asts: Tsao Xun-Xiang 6	boxscore	Pts: Deguara 22; Rebs: Deguara 22; Asts: Hu Kai-Hsiang 8	Arena: Chia Nan University of Pharmacy and Science Shao Tsung Gymnasium; Attendance: 935; Referees: Yu Jung, Chan Yi-Cheng, Wu Pei-Jung

=== Matchweek 13 ===
February 4, 2023 Regular #43	New Taipei CTBC DEA	110–100	Taichung Suns	Taichung City
16:30 (UTC+8)	Scoring by quarter: 32–29, 33–22, 24–25, 21–24
	Pts: King 41; Rebs: Bachir 11; Asts: Hsieh Ya-Hsuan, Lin Ping-Sheng 9	boxscore	Pts: Johnson 33; Rebs: Geramipoor 14; Asts: Ting Sheng-Ju 7	Arena: National Taiwan University of Sport Gymnasium; Attendance: 1,829; Referees: Lin Chien-Hung, Chan Yi-Cheng, Huang Po-Wei

February 4, 2023 Regular #42	TaiwanBeer HeroBears	117–122(OT)	Kaohsiung Aquas	Kaohsiung City
19:00 (UTC+8)	Scoring by quarter: 32–30, 30–36, 21–29, 26–14, Overtime: 8–13
	Pts: Dawson, Chiang Yu-An 28; Rebs: Dawson 17; Asts: Dawson 7	boxscore	Pts: Kupšas 41; Rebs: Kupšas 16; Asts: Brickman 13	Arena: Kaohsiung Arena; Attendance: 4,689; Referees: Yu Jung, Huang Yung-Chu, Chien Chun-Yen

February 5, 2023 Regular #45	Taoyuan Leopards	110–90	Taichung Suns	Taichung City
16:30 (UTC+8)	Scoring by quarter: 20–15, 33–31, 38–22, 19–22
	Pts: Efevberha 37; Rebs: Howard 14; Asts: Howard 6	boxscore	Pts: Ting Sheng-Ju 21; Rebs: Tolbert 11; Asts: Johnson, Tolbert 6	Arena: National Taiwan University of Sport Gymnasium; Attendance: 6,243; Referees: Yu Jung, Hsieh Shang-Chien, Chen Ming-Ling

February 5, 2023 Regular #44	Tainan TSG GhostHawks	90–118	Kaohsiung Aquas	Kaohsiung City
19:00 (UTC+8)	Scoring by quarter: 27–25, 19–26, 21–33, 23–34
	Pts: Upshaw 33; Rebs: Bhullar 12; Asts: Hu Kai-Hsiang, Ku Mao Wei-Chia 4	boxscore	Pts: Brickman 30; Rebs: Kupšas 13; Asts: Kupšas 7	Arena: Kaohsiung Arena; Attendance: 3,796; Referees: Lin Chien-Hung, Lan Wei-Hsiung, Wu Pei-Jung

=== Matchweek 14 ===
February 11, 2023 Regular #46	New Taipei CTBC DEA	88–77	Kaohsiung Aquas	Kaohsiung City
14:00 (UTC+8)	Scoring by quarter: 30–15, 14–19, 20–24, 24–19
	Pts: King 22; Rebs: Želionis 13; Asts: Lin Ping-Sheng 6	boxscore	Pts: Bohannon 17; Rebs: Bohannon 9 Asts: Brickman 9	Arena: Kaohsiung Arena; Attendance: 4,266; Referees: Lan Wei-Hsiung, Chen Chien-Lin, Lin Yu-Hsuan

February 11, 2023 Regular #47	Taichung Suns	95–90	TaiwanBeer HeroBears	Taipei City
16:30 (UTC+8)	Scoring by quarter: 21–21, 25–37, 25–21, 24–11
	Pts: Rice 46; Rebs: Johnson 16; Asts: Ting Sheng-Ju, Johnson 4	boxscore	Pts: Dawson 23; Rebs: Dawson 16; Asts: Jones 7	Arena: University of Taipei Tianmu Campus Gymnasium; Attendance: 1,096; Referees: Wu Chien-Wu, Lin Chien-Hung, Ou Yang Cheng-Te

February 12, 2023 Regular #48	Taoyuan Leopards	137–116	Kaohsiung Aquas	Kaohsiung City
14:00 (UTC+8)	Scoring by quarter: 35–31, 39–27, 30–31, 33–27
	Pts: Howard 28; Rebs: Howard 22; Asts: Howard 14	boxscore	Pts: Bohannon 25; Rebs: Bohannon 13; Asts: Brickman, Hu Long-Mao 8	Arena: Kaohsiung Arena; Attendance: 10,058; Referees: Wu Chien-Wu, Huang Po-Wei, Hsieh Chieh-Lung

February 12, 2023 Regular #49	Tainan TSG GhostHawks	120–110	TaiwanBeer HeroBears	Taipei City
16:30 (UTC+8)	Scoring by quarter: 29–35, 30–25, 30–27, 31–23
	Pts: Bhullar 34; Rebs: Bhullar 13; Asts: Upshaw 8	boxscore	Pts: Chiang Yu-An 42; Rebs: Ibeh 9 Asts: Jones, Chiang Yu-An 5	Arena: University of Taipei Tianmu Campus Gymnasium; Attendance: 1,221; Referees: Huang Yung-Chu, Lai Chien-Hao, Huang Yu-Ming

=== Matchweek 15 ===
February 18, 2023 Regular #50	Kaohsiung Aquas	74–78	TaiwanBeer HeroBears	Taipei City
19:00 (UTC+8)	Scoring by quarter: 24–15, 14–28, 19–18, 17–17
	Pts: Hu Long-Mao, Bohannon 13; Rebs: Bohannon 13; Asts: Brickman, Bohannon 5	boxscore	Pts: Chiang Yu-An 16; Rebs: Dawson 11; Asts: Chiang Yu-An 9	Arena: University of Taipei Tianmu Campus Gymnasium; Attendance: 2,604; Referees: Lin Chien-Hung, Lai Chien-Hao, Chen Chien-Lin

February 19, 2023 Regular #51	Taichung Suns	104–135	Tainan TSG GhostHawks	Tainan City
14:00 (UTC+8)	Scoring by quarter: 33–32, 24–46, 19–23, 28–34
	Pts: Rice 37; Rebs: Tolbert 10; Asts: Ting Sheng-Ju 5	boxscore	Pts: Upshaw 33; Rebs: Upshaw 21; Asts: Ku Mao Wei-Chia 9	Arena: Chia Nan University of Pharmacy and Science Shao Tsung Gymnasium; Attendance: 1,314; Referees: Lan Wei-Hsiung, Huang Yung-Chu, Ou Yang Cheng-Te

February 19, 2023 Regular #52	Taoyuan Leopards	120–108	TaiwanBeer HeroBears	Taipei City
16:30 (UTC+8)	Scoring by quarter: 33–22, 29–24, 25–32, 33–30
	Pts: Efevberha 36; Rebs: Howard 14; Asts: Efevberha, Howard 7	boxscore	Pts: Chiang Yu-An 27; Rebs: Dawson 10; Asts: Chiang Yu-An 6	Arena: University of Taipei Tianmu Campus Gymnasium; Attendance: 3,546; Referees: Wu Chien-Wu, Hsieh Shang-Chien, Hsieh Chieh-Lung

=== Matchweek 16 ===
February 25, 2023 Regular #53	Tainan TSG GhostHawks	91–84	Taichung Suns	Taichung City
14:00 (UTC+8)	Scoring by quarter: 25–18, 27–27, 17–20, 22–19
	Pts: Upshaw 20; Rebs: Upshaw 21; Asts: Chen Ching-Huan 6	boxscore	Pts: Geramipoor 23; Rebs: Putney 12; Asts: Lu Kuan-Hsuan 8	Arena: National Taiwan University of Sport Gymnasium; Attendance: 1,863; Referees: Lai Chien-Hao, Chen Chien-Lin, Liu Nai-Wei

February 25, 2023 Regular #54	Kaohsiung Aquas	86–93	New Taipei CTBC DEA	New Taipei City
16:30 (UTC+8)	Scoring by quarter: 29–19, 15–33, 27–21, 15–20
	Pts: Kupšas 28; Rebs: Kupšas 17; Asts: Bohannon 6	boxscore	Pts: King 33; Rebs: Bērziņš 11; Asts: Lin Wei-Han 9	Arena: Xinzhuang Gymnasium; Attendance: 4,271; Referees: Lan Wei-Hsiung, Ho Chang-Jen, Hsieh Shang-Chien

February 26, 2023 Regular #55	Taoyuan Leopards	95–102	New Taipei CTBC DEA	New Taipei City
16:30 (UTC+8)	Scoring by quarter: 23–29, 32–30, 21–28, 19–15
	Pts: Howard 36; Rebs: Howard 17; Asts: Howard, Efevberha 4	boxscore	Pts: Hsieh Ya-Hsuan 34; Rebs: Želionis 17; Asts: Lin Wei-Han 15	Arena: Xinzhuang Gymnasium; Attendance: 5,952; Referees: Wu Chien-Wu, Lin Chien-Hung, Wu Pei-Jung

February 27, 2023 Regular #56	TaiwanBeer HeroBears	97–91	Taichung Suns	Taichung City
14:00 (UTC+8)	Scoring by quarter: 26–31, 26–14, 24–22, 21–24
	Pts: Jones 27; Rebs: Dawson 17; Asts: Chu I-Tsung 6	boxscore	Pts: Rice 35; Rebs: Geramipoor 10; Asts: Lin Ming-Yi 6	Arena: National Taiwan University of Sport Gymnasium; Attendance: 2,241; Referees: Huang Yung-Chu, Chan Yi-Cheng, Huang Po-Wei

=== Matchweek 17 ===
March 4, 2023 Regular #57	Kaohsiung Aquas	100–107	Tainan TSG GhostHawks	Tainan City
14:00 (UTC+8)	Scoring by quarter: 29–24, 30–29, 20–27, 21–27
	Pts: Brickman 21; Rebs: Bohannon 16; Asts: Brickman 7	boxscore	Pts: Upshaw 27; Rebs: Upshaw 18; Asts: Chien Wei-Ju 6	Arena: Chia Nan University of Pharmacy and Science Shao Tsung Gymnasium; Attendance: 1,185; Referees: Lai Chien-Hao, Chen Chien-Lin, Chien Chun-Yen

March 4, 2023 Regular #58	Taichung Suns	88–96	New Taipei CTBC DEA	New Taipei City
16:30 (UTC+8)	Scoring by quarter: 12–28, 20–22, 30–22, 26–24
	Pts: Rice 29; Rebs: Rice 14; Asts: Rice, Ting Sheng-Ju 3	boxscore	Pts: King 27; Rebs: Želionis 20; Asts: Lin Ping-Sheng 8	Arena: Xinzhuang Gymnasium; Attendance: 3,308; Referees: Wu Chien-Wu, Lin Chien-Hung, Hsieh Chieh-Lung

March 5, 2023 Regular #59	TaiwanBeer HeroBears	95–111	Tainan TSG GhostHawks	Tainan City
14:00 (UTC+8)	Scoring by quarter: 23–27, 31–21, 24–22, 17–41
	Pts: Jones 28; Rebs: Jones 9 Asts: Chiang Yu-An 7	boxscore	Pts: Upshaw 32; Rebs: Bhullar 17; Asts: Hu Kai-Hsiang 10	Arena: Chia Nan University of Pharmacy and Science Shao Tsung Gymnasium; Attendance: 1,249; Referees: Lan Wei-Hsiung, Huang Yung-Chu, Hsieh Shang-Chien

March 5, 2023 Regular #60	Taoyuan Leopards	95–101	New Taipei CTBC DEA	New Taipei City
16:30 (UTC+8)	Scoring by quarter: 28–27, 17–34, 28–23, 22–17
	Pts: Howard 30; Rebs: Howard 31; Asts: Efevberha 6	boxscore	Pts: King, Želionis 27; Rebs: King 10; Asts: Lin Wei-Han 13	Arena: Xinzhuang Gymnasium; Attendance: 5,067; Referees: Yu Jung, Su Yu-Yen, Lai Chien-Hao

=== Matchweek 18 ===
March 8, 2023 Regular #61	TaiwanBeer HeroBears	97–109	Kaohsiung Aquas	Kaohsiung City
19:00 (UTC+8)	Scoring by quarter: 25–33, 32–24, 18–23, 22–29
	Pts: Qualls 43; Rebs: Qualls 11; Asts: Chiang Yu-An 10	boxscore	Pts: Kupšas 28; Rebs: Kupšas 13; Asts: Brickman 11	Arena: Kaohsiung Arena; Attendance: 2,858; Referees: Huang Yung-Chu, Chan Yi-Cheng, Lai Chien-Hao

March 11, 2023 Regular #62	Taichung Suns	92–97	Kaohsiung Aquas	Kaohsiung City
14:00 (UTC+8)	Scoring by quarter: 23–30, 23–23, 19–28, 27–16
	Pts: Moultrie 19; Rebs: Benson 19; Asts: Ting Sheng-Ju 6	boxscore	Pts: Kupšas 25; Rebs: Kupšas 16; Asts: Brickman 17	Arena: Kaohsiung Arena; Attendance: 5,227; Referees: Yu Jung, Chien Chun-Yen, Wu Pei-Jung

March 11, 2023 Regular #63	New Taipei CTBC DEA	89–79	Taoyuan Leopards	Taoyuan City
16:30 (UTC+8)	Scoring by quarter: 20–14, 30–23, 17–20, 22–22
	Pts: King 25; Rebs: Želionis 16; Asts: Lin Wei-Han 5	boxscore	Pts: Efevberha 34; Rebs: Howard 21; Asts: Efevberha 3	Arena: National Taiwan Sport University Arena; Attendance: 11,036; Referees: Lan Wei-Hsiung, Hsieh Shang-Chien, Chen Chien-Lin

March 12, 2023 Regular #64	Tainan TSG GhostHawks	106–94	Kaohsiung Aquas	Kaohsiung City
14:00 (UTC+8)	Scoring by quarter: 28–25, 24–22, 24–23, 30–24
	Pts: Upshaw 30; Rebs: Bhullar 16; Asts: Hu Kai-Hsiang, Wu Yen-Lun 5	boxscore	Pts: Kupšas 23; Rebs: Kupšas 16; Asts: Brickman 8	Arena: Kaohsiung Arena; Attendance: 5,188; Referees: Wu Chien-Wu, Lan Wei-Hsiung, Huang Po-Wei

March 12, 2023 Regular #65	TaiwanBeer HeroBears	110–95	Taoyuan Leopards	Taoyuan City
16:30 (UTC+8)	Scoring by quarter: 41–25, 24–29, 28–22, 17–19
	Pts: Qualls 39; Rebs: Dawson 14; Asts: Chiang Yu-An 8	boxscore	Pts: Howard 23; Rebs: Howard 27; Asts: Howard 7	Arena: National Taiwan Sport University Arena; Attendance: 7,580; Referees: Lin Chien-Hung, Chan Yi-Cheng, Huang Yu-Ming

=== Matchweek 19 ===
March 18, 2023 Regular #66	Tainan TSG GhostHawks	93–91	Taichung Suns	Taichung City
14:00 (UTC+8)	Scoring by quarter: 23–25, 15–16, 37–30, 18–20
	Pts: Bhullar 19; Rebs: Upshaw 21; Asts: Ku Mao Wei-Chia 8	boxscore	Pts: Rice 36; Rebs: Moultrie 15; Asts: Lu Kuan-Hsuan 6	Arena: National Taiwan University of Sport Gymnasium; Attendance: 1,626; Referees: Yu Jung, Huang Yung-Chu, Ou Yang Cheng-Te

March 18, 2023 Regular #67	Kaohsiung Aquas	82–90	Taoyuan Leopards	Taoyuan City
16:30 (UTC+8)	Scoring by quarter: 22–29, 23–24, 19–14, 18–23
	Pts: Brickman 21; Rebs: Bohannon 15; Asts: Brickman 9	boxscore	Pts: Efevberha 38; Rebs: Howard, Davis 12; Asts: Howard 4	Arena: National Taiwan Sport University Arena; Attendance: 10,212; Referees: Wu Chien-Wu, Lai Chien-Hao, Hsieh Chieh-Lung

March 19, 2023 Regular #68	New Taipei CTBC DEA	97–82	Taichung Suns	Taichung City
14:00 (UTC+8)	Scoring by quarter: 26–21, 27–22, 29–18, 15–21
	Pts: King 28; Rebs: Bērziņš 16; Asts: Lin Wei-Han 10	boxscore	Pts: Rice 23; Rebs: Moultrie 10; Asts: Moultrie 8	Arena: National Taiwan University of Sport Gymnasium; Attendance: 1,854; Referees: Lin Chien-Hung, Chan Yi-Cheng, Lin Yu-Hsuan

March 19, 2023 Regular #69	TaiwanBeer HeroBears	99–98	Taoyuan Leopards	Taoyuan City
16:30 (UTC+8)	Scoring by quarter: 23–26, 28–18, 22–22, 26–32
	Pts: Qualls 37; Rebs: Chou Po-Hsun, Qualls 9 Asts: Tsao Xun-Xiang 7	boxscore	Pts: Efevberha 31; Rebs: Howard 21; Asts: Cheng Wei 5	Arena: National Taiwan Sport University Arena; Attendance: 8,253; Referees: Huang Yung-Chu, Hsieh Shang-Chien, Chien Chun-Yen

=== Matchweek 20 ===
Called game (Note: The match, originally scheduled for January 14, 2023, was called win to Kaohsiung Aquas by the T1 League due to the Taichung Suns could not cooperate with the make-up game.) Regular #38	Taichung Suns	0–20	Kaohsiung Aquas
	Scoring by quarter: –, –, –, –
		boxscore

March 25, 2023 Regular #70	Tainan TSG GhostHawks	97–107	Taoyuan Leopards	Taoyuan City
14:00 (UTC+8)	Scoring by quarter: 25–28, 30–31, 22–31, 20–17
	Pts: Deguara 23; Rebs: Upshaw 22; Asts: Ku Mao Wei-Chia 7	boxscore	Pts: Efevberha 34; Rebs: Howard 13; Asts: Efevberha 6	Arena: National Taiwan Sport University Arena; Attendance: 10,082; Referees: Wu Chien-Wu, Hsieh Shang-Chien, Huang Po-Wei

March 25, 2023 Regular #71	TaiwanBeer HeroBears	86–101	New Taipei CTBC DEA	New Taipei City
19:00 (UTC+8)	Scoring by quarter: 18–21, 27–31, 13–25, 28–24
	Pts: Qualls 27; Rebs: Dawson 15; Asts: Chiang Yu-An 5	boxscore	Pts: King 22; Rebs: Krajina, King 11; Asts: King 10	Arena: Xinzhuang Gymnasium; Attendance: 4,183; Referees: Lan Wei-Hsiung, Lai Chien-Hao, Huang Yu-Ming

March 26, 2023 Regular #72	Kaohsiung Aquas	106–93	Taoyuan Leopards	Taoyuan City
14:00 (UTC+8)	Scoring by quarter: 27–27, 27–26, 25–23, 27–17
	Pts: Alexander 24; Rebs: Alexander 12; Asts: Brickman 13	boxscore	Pts: Efevberha 29; Rebs: Howard 14; Asts: Cheng Wei 4	Arena: National Taiwan Sport University Arena; Attendance: 8,212; Referees: Chen Chien-Lin, Huang Yung-Chu, Chien Chun-Yen

March 26, 2023 Regular #73	Taichung Suns	93–112	New Taipei CTBC DEA	New Taipei City
16:30 (UTC+8)	Scoring by quarter: 21–33, 27–15, 25–32, 20–32
	Pts: Rice 30; Rebs: Moultrie 14; Asts: Peng Chun-Yen 5	boxscore	Pts: Hsieh Ya-Hsuan 22; Rebs: Krajina 10; Asts: Lin Wei-Han 12	Arena: Xinzhuang Gymnasium; Attendance: 3,271; Referees: Wu Chien-Wu, Chan Yi-Cheng, Hsieh Chieh-Lung

=== Matchweek 21 ===
March 31, 2023 Regular #74	Taichung Suns	101–97	Taoyuan Leopards	Taoyuan City
19:00 (UTC+8)	Scoring by quarter: 30–26, 22–22, 28–23, 21–26
	Pts: Rice 38; Rebs: Benson 13; Asts: Wen Li-Huang 4	boxscore	Pts: Efevberha 50; Rebs: Howard 19; Asts: Howard 5	Arena: National Taiwan Sport University Arena; Attendance: 6,947; Referees: Lin Chien-Hung, Lan Wei-Hsiung, Chien Chun-Yen

April 1, 2023 Regular #75	Kaohsiung Aquas	91–108	Tainan TSG GhostHawks	Tainan City
14:00 (UTC+8)	Scoring by quarter: 31–27, 20–29, 22–29, 18–23
	Pts: Bohannon 16; Rebs: Bohannon 13; Asts: Brickman 6	boxscore	Pts: Upshaw 29; Rebs: Deguara 14; Asts: Li Han-Sheng 8	Arena: Chia Nan University of Pharmacy and Science Shao Tsung Gymnasium; Attendance: 1,150; Referees: Lai Chien-Hao, Hsieh Shang-Chien, Wu Pei-Jung

April 2, 2023 Regular #76	Taichung Suns	97–118	Tainan TSG GhostHawks	Tainan City
14:00 (UTC+8)	Scoring by quarter: 22–34, 29–36, 11–27, 35–21
	Pts: Rice 33; Rebs: Moultrie 9 Asts: Bayasgalan 6	boxscore	Pts: Deguara 32; Rebs: Bhullar 18; Asts: Li Han-Sheng 8	Arena: Chia Nan University of Pharmacy and Science Shao Tsung Gymnasium; Attendance: 920; Referees: Lan Wei-Hsiung, Chen Chien-Lin, Liu Nai-Wei

April 2, 2023 Regular #77	TaiwanBeer HeroBears	117–92	Taoyuan Leopards	Taoyuan City
16:30 (UTC+8)	Scoring by quarter: 34–28, 28–22, 22–20, 33–22
	Pts: Qualls 33; Rebs: Qualls 15; Asts: Qualls 10	boxscore	Pts: Efevberha 25; Rebs: Davis 14; Asts: Efevberha 7	Arena: National Taiwan Sport University Arena; Attendance: 7,382; Referees: Hsieh Shang-Chien, Lai Chien-Hao, Ou Yang Cheng-Te

April 3, 2023 Regular #78	TaiwanBeer HeroBears	88–103	New Taipei CTBC DEA	New Taipei City
16:30 (UTC+8)	Scoring by quarter: 15–31, 24–30, 22–18, 27–24
	Pts: Chou Po-Hsun, Lee Chi-Wei 16; Rebs: Thabeet 16; Asts: Tsao Xun-Xiang 7	boxscore	Pts: Bachir 19; Rebs: Krajina 16; Asts: Lin Wei-Han 12	Arena: Xinzhuang Gymnasium; Attendance: 3,772; Referees: Wu Chien-Wu, Ho Chang-Jen, Chan Yi-Cheng

April 4, 2023 Regular #79	New Taipei CTBC DEA	108–92	Taoyuan Leopards	Taoyuan City
16:30 (UTC+8)	Scoring by quarter: 23–24, 26–22, 31–16, 28–30
	Pts: King 42; Rebs: Krajina, King 10; Asts: Wei Chia-Hao, Lin Ping-Sheng 5	boxscore	Pts: Howard 25; Rebs: Efevberha 12; Asts: three players 4	Arena: National Taiwan Sport University Arena; Attendance: 7,108; Referees: Lan Wei-Hsiung, Lai Chien-Hao, Wu Pei-Jung

=== Matchweek 22 ===
April 8, 2023 Regular #80	Taichung Suns	97–93	Taoyuan Leopards	Taoyuan City
14:00 (UTC+8)	Scoring by quarter: 22–18, 25–22, 14–30, 36–23
	Pts: Rice 52; Rebs: Rice 9 Asts: Bayasgalan 6	boxscore	Pts: Howard 26; Rebs: Howard 19; Asts: Cheng Wei 8	Arena: National Taiwan Sport University Arena; Attendance: 9,422; Referees: Wu Chien-Wu, Lai Chien-Hao, Hsieh Shang-Chien

April 8, 2023 Regular #81	New Taipei CTBC DEA	96–112	TaiwanBeer HeroBears	New Taipei City
16:30 (UTC+8)	Scoring by quarter: 25–30, 22–32, 28–28, 21–22
	Pts: King 20; Rebs: Krajina 11; Asts: King 6	boxscore	Pts: Qualls 34; Rebs: Qualls 11; Asts: Chiang Yu-An 12	Arena: Fu Jen Catholic University Chung Mei Auditorium; Attendance: 1,373; Referees: Lan Wei-Hsiung, Chen Chien-Lin, Chien Chun-Yen

April 9, 2023 Regular #82	Tainan TSG GhostHawks	92–84	Taoyuan Leopards	Taoyuan City
14:00 (UTC+8)	Scoring by quarter: 27–21, 27–18, 14–30, 24–15
	Pts: Upshaw 24; Rebs: Upshaw 14; Asts: Chen Ching-Huan 8	boxscore	Pts: Cheng Wei 23; Rebs: Davis 19; Asts: Cheng Wei 6	Arena: National Taiwan Sport University Arena; Attendance: 7,200; Referees: Lin Chien-Hung, Lan Wei-Hsiung, Hsieh Chieh-Lung

April 9, 2023 Regular #83	Kaohsiung Aquas	87–99	TaiwanBeer HeroBears	New Taipei City
16:30 (UTC+8)	Scoring by quarter: 24–22, 23–25, 26–28, 14–24
	Pts: Yu Huan-Ya 16; Rebs: Alexander 14; Asts: Brickman 11	boxscore	Pts: Qualls 37; Rebs: Qualls 21; Asts: Jones 6	Arena: Fu Jen Catholic University Chung Mei Auditorium; Attendance: 1,178; Referees: Hsieh Shang-Chien, Lai Chien-Hao, Chen Ming-Ling

=== Matchweek 23 ===
April 15, 2023 Regular #84	TaiwanBeer HeroBears	98–95	Taichung Suns	Taichung City
14:00 (UTC+8)	Scoring by quarter: 24–16, 21–33, 18–30, 35–16
	Pts: Lee Chi-Wei 23; Rebs: Jones 18; Asts: Chiang Yu-An 13	boxscore	Pts: Moultrie 19; Rebs: Benson 14; Asts: three players 4	Arena: National Taiwan University of Sport Gymnasium; Attendance: 1,709; Referees: Su Yu-Yen, Hsieh Shang-Chien, Liu Nai-Wei

April 15, 2023 Regular #85	Taoyuan Leopards	65–108	Tainan TSG GhostHawks	Tainan City
16:30 (UTC+8)	Scoring by quarter: 18–26, 22–25, 16–29, 9–28
	Pts: Davis 29; Rebs: Davis 19; Asts: Cheng Wei 7	boxscore	Pts: Weathers 25; Rebs: Weathers 16; Asts: Li Han-Sheng 7	Arena: Chia Nan University of Pharmacy and Science Shao Tsung Gymnasium; Attendance: 1,609; Referees: Yu Jung, Chen Chien-Lin, Lin Yu-Hsuan

April 16, 2023 Regular #86	Kaohsiung Aquas	111–104	Taichung Suns	Taichung City
14:00 (UTC+8)	Scoring by quarter: 36–28, 24–29, 27–24, 24–23
	Pts: Hu Long-Mao 31; Rebs: Bohannon 17; Asts: Brickman 13	boxscore	Pts: Rice 25; Rebs: Moultrie 10; Asts: Bayasgalan 10	Arena: National Taiwan University of Sport Gymnasium; Attendance: 1,763; Referees: Lin Chien-Hung, Lai Chien-Hao, Huang Yu-Ming

April 16, 2023 Regular #87	New Taipei CTBC DEA	114–105	Tainan TSG GhostHawks	Tainan City
16:30 (UTC+8)	Scoring by quarter: 36–30, 28–33, 22–23, 28–19
	Pts: Bachir 30; Rebs: King 9 Asts: Lin Ping-Sheng 8	boxscore	Pts: Upshaw 26; Rebs: Bhullar 12; Asts: Chien Wei-Ju, Upshaw 7	Arena: Chia Nan University of Pharmacy and Science Shao Tsung Gymnasium; Attendance: 1,703; Referees: Wu Chien-Wu, Lan Wei-Hsiung, Chen Ming-Ling

=== Matchweek 24 ===
April 22, 2023 Regular #88	Tainan TSG GhostHawks	102–114	New Taipei CTBC DEA	New Taipei City
14:00 (UTC+8)	Scoring by quarter: 19–27, 23–25, 21–34, 39–28
	Pts: Deguara 36; Rebs: Deguara 19; Asts: Li Han-Sheng 5	boxscore	Pts: King 25; Rebs: Krajina, Bērziņš 7 Asts: Lin Wei-Han 13	Arena: Xinzhuang Gymnasium; Attendance: 3,911; Referees: Lan Wei-Hsiung, Lai Chien-Hao, Hsieh Chieh-Lung

April 22, 2023 Regular #89	Taoyuan Leopards	86–93	TaiwanBeer HeroBears	New Taipei City
16:30 (UTC+8)	Scoring by quarter: 24–26, 17–24, 26–25, 19–18
	Pts: Davis 31; Rebs: Davis 25; Asts: Cheng Wei 7	boxscore	Pts: Thabeet 32; Rebs: Thabeet 14; Asts: Tsao Xun-Xiang 8	Arena: Fu Jen Catholic University Chung Mei Auditorium; Attendance: 1,989; Referees: Wu Chien-Wu, Chien Chun-Yen, Ou Yang Cheng-Te

April 23, 2023 Regular #90	Taichung Suns	79–95	New Taipei CTBC DEA	New Taipei City
14:00 (UTC+8)	Scoring by quarter: 26–31, 18–19, 17–24, 18–21
	Pts: Moultrie 16; Rebs: Benson 10; Asts: Ting Sheng-Ju 8	boxscore	Pts: Bachir, Krajina 13; Rebs: Krajina 12; Asts: four players 5	Arena: Xinzhuang Gymnasium; Attendance: 3,186; Referees: Chen Chien-Lin, Hsieh Shang-Chien, Huang Po-Wei

== Awards ==
=== Yearly awards ===
2022–23 T1 League awards
Award	Recipient	Team	Ref.
Most Valuable Player	Mohammad Al Bachir Gadiaga	New Taipei CTBC DEA	
Most Valuable Import	Dwight Howard	Taoyuan Leopards	
Most Popular Player of the Year	Mohammad Al Bachir Gadiaga	New Taipei CTBC DEA	
Best Home-Court of the Year	New Taipei CTBC DEA		
Defensive Player of the Year	Lin Wei-Han	New Taipei CTBC DEA	
Rookie of the Year	Ku Mao Wei-Chia	Tainan TSG GhostHawks	
Sixth Man of the Year	Ku Mao Wei-Chia	Tainan TSG GhostHawks	
Most Improved Player	Hsieh Ya-Hsuan	New Taipei CTBC DEA	
Coach of the Year	Lee Yi-Hua	New Taipei CTBC DEA	
General Manager of the Year	Liu Chih-Wei	New Taipei CTBC DEA	
Referees of the Year	Yu Jung		

- All-T1 League First Team:
  - Lin Wei-Han (New Taipei CTBC DEA)
  - Mohammad Al Bachir Gadiaga (New Taipei CTBC DEA)
  - Chiang Yu-An (TaiwanBeer HeroBears)
  - Dwight Howard (Taoyuan Leopards)
  - Jason Brickman (Kaohsiung Aquas)
- All-Defensive First Team:
  - Lin Wei-Han (New Taipei CTBC DEA)
  - Lin Ping-Sheng (New Taipei CTBC DEA)
  - Dwight Howard (Taoyuan Leopards)
  - Deyonta Davis (Taoyuan Leopards)
  - Hu Long-Mao (Kaohsiung Aquas)

=== Statistical awards ===
2022–23 T1 League statistical awards
Award	Recipient	Team	Statistic	Ref.
Points Leader	Michael Efevberha	Taoyuan Leopards	28.7	
Rebounds Leader	Dwight Howard	Taoyuan Leopards	16.2	
Assists Leader	Lin Wei-Han	New Taipei CTBC DEA	10.0	
Steals Leader	Lin Wei-Han	New Taipei CTBC DEA	2.9	
Blocks Leader	Deyonta Davis	Taoyuan Leopards	2.2	

=== MVP of the Month ===
MVP of the Month awards were only for local players.

Month	Recipient	Team	Ref.
2022
November	Mohammad Al Bachir Gadiaga	New Taipei CTBC DEA	
December	Lin Wei-Han	New Taipei CTBC DEA	
2023
January	Hsieh Ya-Hsuan	New Taipei CTBC DEA	
February	Hsieh Ya-Hsuan	New Taipei CTBC DEA	
March	Lin Wei-Han	New Taipei CTBC DEA	
April	Hu Long-Mao	Kaohsiung Aquas	

=== Import of the Month ===
Import of the Month awards were only for import players and type-III players.

Month	Recipient	Team	Ref.
2022
November	Tony Bishop	Taichung Suns	
December	Edgaras Želionis	New Taipei CTBC DEA	
2023
January	Samuel Deguara	Tainan TSG GhostHawks	
February	Dwight Howard	Taoyuan Leopards	
March	Edgaras Želionis	New Taipei CTBC DEA	
April	Robert Upshaw	Tainan TSG GhostHawks	

== See also ==
- 2022–23 Kaohsiung Aquas season
- 2022–23 New Taipei CTBC DEA season
- 2022–23 Taichung Suns season
- 2022–23 Tainan TSG GhostHawks season
- 2022–23 TaiwanBeer HeroBears season
- 2022–23 Taoyuan Leopards season
