= 2022–23 T1 League season =

2nd T1 League season

- League: T1 League
- Sport: Basketball
- Duration: October 29, 2022 – April 23, 2023 (regular season); February 28, 2023 (all-star game); April 25 – 27, 2023 (play-in); April 28 – May 8, 2023 (semifinals); May 13 – 21, 2023 (finals)
- Games: 30 per team
- Teams: 6
- TV partner(s): Eleven Sports, VL Sports, ELTA TV

Draft
- Top draft pick: No picking order in this draft

Regular season
- Top seed: New Taipei CTBC DEA
- Season MVP: Mohammad Al Bachir Gadiaga (DEA)
- Top scorer: Michael Efevberha (Leopards)

Playoffs

Finals
- Champions: New Taipei CTBC DEA
- Runners-up: Tainan TSG GhostHawks
- Finals MVP: Lin Wei-Han (DEA)

T1 League seasons
- ← 2021–22 2023–24 →

The 2022–23 T1 League season was the second season of the T1 League, with the Kaohsiung Aquas, New Taipei CTBC DEA, Taichung Suns, Tainan TSG GhostHawks, TaiwanBeer HeroBears, and the Taoyuan Leopards participating in this competition. The regular season started on October 29, 2022 and ended on April 23, 2023. The All-Star Game was played on February 28. The play-in series started on April 25 and ended on April 27. The semifinals series started on April 28 and ended on May 8. The finals series started on May 13 and ended on May 21. On May 21, the New Taipei CTBC DEA defeated the Tainan TSG GhostHawks, 4–0, winning the 2022–23 season championship.

== Teams ==
Team	Chinese name	Location	Arena	Map
Kaohsiung Aquas	高雄全家海神	Kaohsiung City	Kaohsiung Arena	2022–23 T1 League season is located in Taiwan
New Taipei CTBC DEA	新北中信特攻	New Taipei City	Xinzhuang Gymnasium	2022–23 T1 League season is located in Taiwan
Taichung Suns	臺中太陽	Taichung City	National Taiwan University of Sport Gymnasium	2022–23 T1 League season is located in Taiwan
Tainan TSG GhostHawks	臺南台鋼獵鷹	Tainan City	Chia Nan University of Pharmacy and Science Shao Tsung Gymnasium	2022–23 T1 League season is located in Taiwan
TaiwanBeer HeroBears	台灣啤酒英熊	Taipei City	University of Taipei Tianmu Campus Gymnasium; Fu Jen Catholic University Chung Mei Auditorium (Note: Home games of the April 8, 9, and 22, 2023.)	2022–23 T1 League season is located in Taiwan
Taoyuan Leopards	桃園永豐雲豹	Taoyuan City	National Taiwan Sport University Arena	2022–23 T1 League season is located in Taiwan

== Season format ==
- Each team plays against another six times, three at home and three on the road, respectively. Each team plays 30 matches total in the regular season.
- Play-in series: Best-of-three series. The series are contested by the teams that finished the regular season as the fourth seed and fifth seed. The fourth seed is awarded a one-win advantage. The winner can qualify to the semifinals series.
- Semifinals series: Best-of-five series. Matchup is decided by seeding in regular season. The first seed plays against the winner of play-in series. The second seed plays against the third seed. The winners can qualify for the finals series.
- Finals series: Best-of-seven series. The series are contested by the winners of semifinals series.

== Import players restrictions ==
- Each team is able to register 2 or 3 general import players and 1 type-III player.
- Each team is able to select 2 or 3 import players (including at least 1 type-III player) into active roster in each match.
- 8-imports-in-4-quarters rule: each quarter can have 2 import players or 1 import player and 1 type-III player on the court.
- Type-III player eligibility:
1. Naturalized players
2. Asian import players (Note: Since the 2021–22 season, the T1 League allowed players from Brunei, Cambodia, Hong Kong, Indonesia, Japan, Laos, Macao, Malaysia, Myanmar, the Philippines, Singapore, South Korea, Thailand, and Vietnam to play as Asian import players.)
3. Foreign students
4. Overseas compatriots
- Since December 31, 2022, each team was able to register 3 or 4 general import players, and the T1 League cancelled type-III player.

== Import and type-III players ==
Team	Import players	Type-III players	Former import / type-III players
Kaohsiung Aquas	(Lithuania) Mindaugas Kupšas (Jordan) (United States) John Bohannon (Philippines) (United States) Jason Brickman (United States) Xavier Alexander	(Philippines) (United States) Jason Brickman	(United States) Elijah Thomas
New Taipei CTBC DEA	(Lithuania) Edgaras Želionis (Croatia) Kristijan Krajina (United States) Nick King (Latvia) Kaspars Bērziņš	—N/a	(Croatia) Jure Gunjina (United States) Demitrius Conger
Taichung Suns	(United States) Rayvonte Rice (Saint Vincent and the Grenadines) Austin Derrick (United States) Arnett Moultrie (United States) Keith Benson	(Saint Vincent and the Grenadines) Austin Derrick	(United States) Diamond Stone (Panama) (United States) Tony Bishop (Philippines) Niño Canaleta (United States) Jordan Tolbert (United States) Marlon Johnson (United States) Raphiael Putney (United Kingdom) (Iran) Aaron Geramipoor
Tainan TSG GhostHawks	(Malta) (Italy) Samuel Deguara (United States) Robert Upshaw (Canada) Sim Bhullar (United States) Marcus Weathers	—N/a	(Philippines) (United States) Sedrick Barefield (III) (United States) Taylor Braun (United States) Shaheed Davis (United States) Nick Faust
TaiwanBeer HeroBears	(United States) Perry Jones (United States) Michael Qualls (Tanzania) Hasheem Thabeet	—N/a	(Australia) Matt Hodgson (Serbia) Milenko Veljković (United States) Cleanthony Early (United States) (Rwanda) Prince Ibeh (United States) Branden Dawson
Taoyuan Leopards	(United States) Deyonta Davis (United States) Dwight Howard (Nigeria) (United States) Michael Efevberha (Sudan) (United States) Richard Laku	—N/a	(United States) Troy Williams (Poland) Adam Łapeta

(III): Type-III players

== Transactions ==
=== Retirement ===
- On July 18, 2022, Tsai Yao-Hsun joined the Hou-Zong Senior High School basketball team as coach, ending his playing career.
- On August 9, 2022, Kao Kuo-Chiang joined the Lioneers Jr. Team as coach, ending his playing career.
- On August 15, 2022, Li Ping-Hung joined the National Taiwan Normal University basketball team as head coach, ending his playing career.
- On August 17, 2022, Chang Chih-Feng joined the Chung Yuan Christian University basketball team as head coach, ending his playing career.
- On December 20, 2022, Niño Canaleta was hired as the assistant coach of the Taichung Suns, ending his playing career.
- On December 25, 2022, Anthony Tucker announced his retirement from professional basketball.
- Oscar Lin joined the Kaohsiung 17LIVE Steelers as personal skills coach and team interpreter, ending his playing career.
- Chiang Chiao-An joined the Peiying Junior High School basketball team as assistant coach, ending his playing career.

=== Draft ===
The 2022 T1 League draft was held on July 12, 2022, at Syntrend Creative Park in Taipei City.

=== Coaching changes ===
Coaching changes
Team	2021–22 season	2022–23 season
Off-season
Taichung Suns	Iurgi Caminos	Alberto Garcia
Tainan TSG GhostHawks	Liu Meng-Chu (interim)	Liu Meng-Chu
Taichung Suns	Alberto Garcia	Chris Gavina
In-season
Tainan TSG GhostHawks	Liu Meng-Chu	Ma I-Hung (interim)
Tainan TSG GhostHawks	Ma I-Hung (interim)	Liu Meng-Chu
Tainan TSG GhostHawks	Liu Meng-Chu	Ma I-Hung (interim)
Taoyuan Leopards	Liu Chia-Fa	John Bennett
Tainan TSG GhostHawks	Ma I-Hung (interim)	Liu Meng-Chu

==== Off-season ====
- On July 1, 2022, the Taoyuan Pilots hired Iurgi Caminos, the head coach of the Taichung Wagor Suns, as their new head coach.
- On July 6, 2022, the Tainan TSG GhostHawks interim head coach, Liu Meng-Chu was promoted to the new head coach.
- On September 18, 2022, the Taichung Wagor Suns assistant coach, Alberto Garcia was promoted to the new head coach.
- On October 25, 2022, the Taichung Suns hired Chris Gavina as their new head coach.

==== In-season ====
- On March 3, 2023, the Tainan TSG GhostHawks assistant coach, Ma I-Hung was named as their interim head coach for one game since Liu Meng-Chu coached UCH basketball team for University Basketball Association (UBA) 2022–23 season quarterfinals series.
- On March 24, 2023, the Tainan TSG GhostHawks named Ma I-Hung as their interim head coach for one game since Liu Meng-Chu coached UCH basketball team for University Basketball Association (UBA) 2022–23 season semifinals series.
- On March 24, 2023, the Taoyuan Leopards named Liu Chia-Fa as their player development and skills consultant, and hired John Bennett as their new head coach.

== 2022 interleague play ==
Five teams, including the New Taipei CTBC DEA, the Taichung Suns, the Tainan TSG GhostHawks, the TaiwanBeer HeroBears, and the Taoyuan Leopards, participated in these invitational games individually. And the Kaohsiung Aquas players, Chiu Tzu-Hsuan and Lu Wei-Ting, joined to the Chinese Taipei National Training Team in these invitational games.

== Preseason ==
The T1 League held the preseason games at the Xinzhuang Gymnasium on October 14 to 16, 2022.

=== Game log ===
October 14, 2022 Preseason #01	Kaohsiung Aquas	115–116	New Taipei CTBC DEA	New Taipei City
15:00 (UTC+8)	Scoring by quarter: 27–35, 33–24, 34–29, 21–28
	Pts: Hu Long-Mao, Kupšas 26; Rebs: Kupšas 16; Asts: Brickman 8	boxscore	Pts: Želionis, Lin Wei-Han 26; Rebs: Želionis 12; Asts: Lin Wei-Han 8	Arena: Xinzhuang Gymnasium; Referees: Chen Chien-Lin, Hsieh Shang-Chien, Kao Ta-Wei

October 14, 2022 Preseason #02	Tainan TSG GhostHawks	115–86	Taichung Suns	New Taipei City
18:00 (UTC+8)	Scoring by quarter: 26–22, 38–21, 39–14, 12–29
	Pts: Deguara 31; Rebs: Deguara 17; Asts: Hu Kai-Hsiang 7	boxscore	Pts: Wen Li-Huang 22; Rebs: Derrick, Wen Li-Huang 7 Asts: Bayasgalan 7	Arena: Xinzhuang Gymnasium; Referees: Lin Chien-Hung, Lai Chien-Hao, Chen Ming-Ling

October 15, 2022 Preseason #03	New Taipei CTBC DEA	115–72	Taoyuan Leopards	New Taipei City
15:00 (UTC+8)	Scoring by quarter: 26–18, 29–17, 30–14, 30–23
	Pts: Wei Chia-Hao 19; Rebs: Morrison 12; Asts: Wei Chia-Hao 6	boxscore	Pts: Łapeta 16; Rebs: Łapeta 14; Asts: Chen Hsiao-Jung 6	Arena: Xinzhuang Gymnasium; Attendance: 3,145; Referees: Yu Jung, Huang Po-Wei, Lin Yu-Hsuan

October 15, 2022 Preseason #04	TaiwanBeer HeroBears	114–118	Tainan TSG GhostHawks	New Taipei City
18:00 (UTC+8)	Scoring by quarter: 26–28, 31–24, 29–35, 28–31
	Pts: Hicks 22; Rebs: Veljković 11; Asts: Chiang Yu-An 8	boxscore	Pts: Braun 38; Rebs: Smart 23; Asts: Ku Mao Wei-Chia 8	Arena: Xinzhuang Gymnasium; Attendance: 3,145; Referees: Huang Yung-Chu, Chan Yi-Cheng, Wu Pei-Jung

October 16, 2022 Preseason #05	Taichung Suns	62–93	Kaohsiung Aquas	New Taipei City
15:00 (UTC+8)	Scoring by quarter: 16–28, 17–21, 21–22, 8–22
	Pts: Wen Li-Huang 12; Rebs: Bishop 9 Asts: Lu Kuan-Hsuan 6	boxscore	Pts: Kupšas 24; Rebs: Kupšas 21; Asts: Brickman 9	Arena: Xinzhuang Gymnasium; Attendance: 1,063; Referees: Wu Chien-Wu, Hsieh Chieh-Lung, Chien Chun-Yen

October 16, 2022 Preseason #06	Taoyuan Leopards	90–106	TaiwanBeer HeroBears	New Taipei City
18:00 (UTC+8)	Scoring by quarter: 19–33, 22–18, 28–27, 21–28
	Pts: Williams 21; Rebs: Davis, Łapeta 12; Asts: Chen Hsiao-Jung 5	boxscore	Pts: Hicks 28; Rebs: Veljković, Chou Po-Hsun 13; Asts: Chiang Yu-An, Tsao Xun-Xiang 4	Arena: Xinzhuang Gymnasium; Attendance: 1,063; Referees: Lan Wei-Hsiung, Huang Ho-Yung, Huang Yu-Ming

== Regular season ==
The regular season started on October 29, 2022 and ended on April 23, 2023. On October 29, the 2022–23 season opening game, matched by the Kaohsiung Aquas and the New Taipei CTBC DEA, was played at Xinzhuang Gymnasium.

=== League table ===
Pos	Team	Pld	W	L	PCT	GB	Qualification
1	New Taipei CTBC DEA	30	25	5	.833	—	Advance to semifinals
2	Tainan TSG GhostHawks	30	19	11	.633	6	Advance to semifinals
3	Kaohsiung Aquas	30	16	14	.533	9	Advance to semifinals
4	TaiwanBeer HeroBears	30	16	14	.533	9	Advance to play-in
5	Taichung Suns	30	8	22	.267	17	Advance to play-in
6	Taoyuan Leopards	30	6	24	.200	19	

Source: T1 League

=== Results ===
Home \ Away	HEROBEARS	DEA	LEOPARDS	SUNS	GHOSTHAWKS	AQUAS
TaiwanBeer HeroBears	—	103–117	114–111	109–94	112–108	101–111
TaiwanBeer HeroBears	—	75–112	108–120	105–89	112–109	78–74
TaiwanBeer HeroBears	—	112–96	93–86	90–95	110–120	99–87
New Taipei CTBC DEA	88–81	—	103–94	96–88	101–98	109–87
New Taipei CTBC DEA	101–86	—	102–95	112–93	101–93	93–85
New Taipei CTBC DEA	103–88	—	101–95	95–79	114–102	93–86
Taoyuan Leopards	95–110	120–115*	—	94–103	78–87	89–93
Taoyuan Leopards	98–99	79–89	—	97–101	107–97	90–82
Taoyuan Leopards	92–117	92–108	—	93–97	84–92	93–106
Taichung Suns	80–92	112–109	93–87	—	96–93	79–99
Taichung Suns	91–97	100–110	96–71	—	84–91	92–100
Taichung Suns	95–98	82–97	90–110	—	91–93	104–111
Tainan TSG GhostHawks	120–99	104–107	114–100	106–95	—	119–118**
Tainan TSG GhostHawks	105–102	111–116	105–96	135–104	—	107–100
Tainan TSG GhostHawks	111–95	105–114	108–65	118–97	—	108–91
Kaohsiung Aquas	97–98	105–81	130–109	120–90	92–101	—
Kaohsiung Aquas	122–117*	105–87	101–87	97–92	118–90	—
Kaohsiung Aquas	109–97	77–88	116–137	20–0 (Note: The match was called win to Kaohsiung Aquas by the T1 League due to the Taichung Suns could not cooperate with the make-up game.)	94–106	—

Source: T1 League
Legend: Blue = home team win; Red = away team win.

=== Postponed games due to COVID-19 ===
- One Kaohsiung Aquas home game (against the Taichung Suns on January 14) was postponed due to the Taichung Suns could not reach the minimum player number.

== All-Star Game ==
The All-Star Game was played at Taipei Heping Basketball Gymnasium on February 28, 2023.

Eleven Sports
VL Sports
ELTA TV

February 28, 2023
16:40 (UTC+8)

boxscore

Team Beyond	124–179	Team Infinity
Scoring by quarter: 32–53, 25–64, 42–39, 25–23
Pts: Upshaw 34; Rebs: Lin Wei-Han 7 Asts: Lin Wei-Han, Hsieh Ya-Hsuan 6		Pts: Howard 37; Rebs: Howard 13; Asts: Ku Mao Wei-Chia 9

Taipei Heping Basketball Gymnasium, Taipei City
Attendance: 7,000
Referees: Lan Wei-Hsiung, Lin Chien-Hung, Lin Yu-Hsuan

== Playoffs ==
- Play-in series: The fourth and fifth seeds play the best-of-three play-in series. The fourth seed will be awarded a one-win advantage. The winner can qualify the semifinals series.
- Semifinals series: The winner of play-in series and the top three seeds play the best-of-five semifinals series. The winners can qualify the finals series.
- Finals series: The winners of the semifinals series play the best-of-seven finals series.

=== Bracket ===
Play-in
4	TaiwanBeer HeroBears	1
5	**Taichung Suns**	**2**

Semifinals
1	**New Taipei CTBC DEA**	**3**
5	Taichung Suns	0
2	**Tainan TSG GhostHawks**	**3**
3	Kaohsiung Aquas	2

Finals
1	**New Taipei CTBC DEA**	**4**
2	Tainan TSG GhostHawks	0

Bold: Series winner
Italic: Team with home-court advantage

== Statistics ==
=== Individual statistic leaders ===
Category	Player	Team	Statistic
Points per game	Michael Efevberha	Taoyuan Leopards	28.7
Rebounds per game	Dwight Howard	Taoyuan Leopards	16.2
Assists per game	Lin Wei-Han	New Taipei CTBC DEA	10.0
Steals per game	Lin Wei-Han	New Taipei CTBC DEA	2.9
Blocks per game	Deyonta Davis	Taoyuan Leopards	2.2
Turnovers per game	Samuel Deguara	Tainan TSG GhostHawks	4.1
Fouls per game	Kristijan Krajina	New Taipei CTBC DEA	3.9
Minutes per game	Jason Brickman	Kaohsiung Aquas	42:15
FG%	Samuel Deguara	Tainan TSG GhostHawks	70.0%
3P%	Hsieh Ya-Hsuan	New Taipei CTBC DEA	44.6%
FT%	Michael Efevberha	Taoyuan Leopards	91.2%

=== Individual game highs ===
Category	Player	Team	Statistic
Points	Cleanthony Early	TaiwanBeer HeroBears	56
Rebounds	Dwight Howard	Taoyuan Leopards	31
Assists	Jason Brickman	Kaohsiung Aquas	17
Steals	Branden Dawson	TaiwanBeer HeroBears	8
Steals	Michael Qualls	TaiwanBeer HeroBears	8
Steals	Lin Wei-Han	New Taipei CTBC DEA	8
Blocks	Deyonta Davis	Taoyuan Leopards	9
Turnovers	Dwight Howard	Taoyuan Leopards	11
Three pointers	Hsieh Ya-Hsuan	New Taipei CTBC DEA	10

=== Team statistic leaders ===
Category	Team	Statistic
Points per game	Tainan TSG GhostHawks	105.2
Rebounds per game	Tainan TSG GhostHawks	51.9
Assists per game	New Taipei CTBC DEA	26.3
Steals per game	New Taipei CTBC DEA	11.3
Blocks per game	TaiwanBeer HeroBears	4.8
Turnovers per game	Tainan TSG GhostHawks	17.9
Fouls per game	New Taipei CTBC DEA	23.3
FG%	Tainan TSG GhostHawks	45.5%
3P%	New Taipei CTBC DEA	34.0%
FT%	Taoyuan Leopards	71.0%

== Awards ==
=== Yearly awards ===
2022–23 T1 League awards
Award	Recipient	Team	Ref.
Most Valuable Player	Mohammad Al Bachir Gadiaga	New Taipei CTBC DEA	
Most Valuable Import	Dwight Howard	Taoyuan Leopards	
Most Popular Player of the Year	Mohammad Al Bachir Gadiaga	New Taipei CTBC DEA	
Best Home-Court of the Year	New Taipei CTBC DEA		
Defensive Player of the Year	Lin Wei-Han	New Taipei CTBC DEA	
Rookie of the Year	Ku Mao Wei-Chia	Tainan TSG GhostHawks	
Sixth Man of the Year	Ku Mao Wei-Chia	Tainan TSG GhostHawks	
Most Improved Player	Hsieh Ya-Hsuan	New Taipei CTBC DEA	
Coach of the Year	Lee Yi-Hua	New Taipei CTBC DEA	
General Manager of the Year	Liu Chih-Wei	New Taipei CTBC DEA	
Referees of the Year	Yu Jung		

- All-T1 League First Team:
  - Lin Wei-Han (New Taipei CTBC DEA)
  - Mohammad Al Bachir Gadiaga (New Taipei CTBC DEA)
  - Chiang Yu-An (TaiwanBeer HeroBears)
  - Dwight Howard (Taoyuan Leopards)
  - Jason Brickman (Kaohsiung Aquas)
- All-Defensive First Team:
  - Lin Wei-Han (New Taipei CTBC DEA)
  - Lin Ping-Sheng (New Taipei CTBC DEA)
  - Dwight Howard (Taoyuan Leopards)
  - Deyonta Davis (Taoyuan Leopards)
  - Hu Long-Mao (Kaohsiung Aquas)

=== Statistical awards ===
2022–23 T1 League statistical awards
Award	Recipient	Team	Statistic	Ref.
Points Leader	Michael Efevberha	Taoyuan Leopards	28.7	
Rebounds Leader	Dwight Howard	Taoyuan Leopards	16.2	
Assists Leader	Lin Wei-Han	New Taipei CTBC DEA	10.0	
Steals Leader	Lin Wei-Han	New Taipei CTBC DEA	2.9	
Blocks Leader	Deyonta Davis	Taoyuan Leopards	2.2	

=== All-Star Game awards ===
2023 T1 League All-Star Game awards
Award	Recipient	Team	Ref.
All-Star Game Most Famous Player	Dwight Howard	Taoyuan Leopards	
All-Star Game Most Famous Player	Mohammad Al Bachir Gadiaga	New Taipei CTBC DEA	
All-Star Game MVP	Dwight Howard	Taoyuan Leopards	
Three-Point Contest Champion	Lu Kuan-Hsuan	Taichung Suns	
Slam Dunk Contest Champion	Liu Chun-Ting	Tainan TSG GhostHawks	

=== Finals awards ===
2023 T1 League Finals awards
Award	Recipient	Team	Ref.
Champion	New Taipei CTBC DEA		
Finals MVP	Lin Wei-Han	New Taipei CTBC DEA	

=== MVP of the Month ===
MVP of the Month awards were only for local players.

Month	Recipient	Team	Ref.
2022
November	Mohammad Al Bachir Gadiaga	New Taipei CTBC DEA	
December	Lin Wei-Han	New Taipei CTBC DEA	
2023
January	Hsieh Ya-Hsuan	New Taipei CTBC DEA	
February	Hsieh Ya-Hsuan	New Taipei CTBC DEA	
March	Lin Wei-Han	New Taipei CTBC DEA	
April	Hu Long-Mao	Kaohsiung Aquas	

=== Import of the Month ===
Import of the Month awards were only for import players and type-III players.

Month	Recipient	Team	Ref.
2022
November	Tony Bishop	Taichung Suns	
December	Edgaras Želionis	New Taipei CTBC DEA	
2023
January	Samuel Deguara	Tainan TSG GhostHawks	
February	Dwight Howard	Taoyuan Leopards	
March	Edgaras Želionis	New Taipei CTBC DEA	
April	Robert Upshaw	Tainan TSG GhostHawks	

== Arenas ==
- The Taoyuan Leopards announced that they would play their home games at the National Taiwan Sport University Arena in this season.
- The TaiwanBeer HeroBears announced that their home games on April 8, 9, and 22, 2023 would change to Fu Jen Catholic University Chung Mei Auditorium in New Taipei City.

== Media ==
- The games will be broadcast on television via Eleven Sports, VL Sports and ELTA TV, and online via YouTube.
- The games will be broadcast online via Camerabay since December 16, 2022.

== Notable occurrences ==
- The Taichung Wagor Suns were renamed to the Taichung Suns.
- On September 5, 2022, the T1 League announced that Liu Yi-Cheng served as the vice commissioner of the league. Hsieh Chih-Cheng was the new chief operating officer, and Chang Shu-Jen, the general manager of the New Taipei CTBC DEA, was the new secretary general of the league. The former secretary general and chief operating officer, Chang Yun-Chih and Chia Fan, would transfer to senior consultant and tournament consultant, respectively.
- On September 29, 2022, the T1 League announced that Tsai Shang-Hua served as the strategic marketing director of the league.
- On September 30, 2022, Tseng Wen-Ting of the New Taipei CTBC DEA became the first player to join SBL, CBA, ABL, PLG, and T1 League.
- On October 18, 2022, the T1 League announced that Delgerchuluun Bayasgalan played as special foreign student in the league.
- On November 8, 2022, Dwight Howard, the 2004 first overall NBA draft pick, an NBA champion, eight-time NBA All-Star, eight-time All-NBA Team honoree, five-time NBA All-Defensive Team member, and three-time NBA Defensive Player of the Year, signed with the Taoyuan Leopards.
- On November 26, 2022, Hu Kai-Hsiang of the Tainan TSG GhostHawks recorded 2,000 points in his career.
- On December 11, 2022, Yu Huan-Ya of the Kaohsiung Aquas recorded 2,000 points in his career.
- On December 11, 2022, Li Han-Sheng of the Tainan TSG GhostHawks became the first local player to record triple-double (with 16 points, 12 rebounds, and 10 assists) in T1 League history.
- On December 11, 2022, the game matched by the Kaohsiung Aquas and the Tainan TSG GhostHawks became the first game that two players recorded triple-double (Li Han-Sheng of the Tainan TSG GhostHawks with 16 points, 12 rebounds, and 10 assists; Jason Brickman of the Kaohsiung Aquas with 22 points, 10 rebounds, and 13 assists) in T1 League history.
- On December 11, 2022, Mindaugas Kupšas of the Kaohsiung Aquas recorded 500 rebounds in T1 League career.
- On December 17, 2022, Diamond Stone of the Taichung Suns recorded 1,000 points in T1 League career.
- On December 17, 2022, Lin Wei-Han of the New Taipei CTBC DEA became the first player to record triple-double (with 18 points, 11 rebounds, and 12 assists) in SBL, CBA, and T1 League. And he also became the first local player to record triple-double during the regulation game in T1 League history.
- On December 18, 2022, Jason Brickman of the Kaohsiung Aquas became the first player to record triple-double (with 19 points, 12 rebounds, and 11 assists) with two straight games in T1 League history.
- On December 31, 2022, the T1 League cancelled type-III player.
- On January 14, 2023, Hsieh Ya-Hsuan of the New Taipei CTBC DEA recorded 100 three pointers in his career.
- On February 2, 2023, Lu Tsai Yu-Lun became the first player on loan in T1 League history.
- On February 4, 2023, Lin Jen-Hung of the Kaohsiung Aquas recorded 1,000 points in his career.
- On February 4, 2023, Mohammad Al Bachir Gadiaga of the New Taipei CTBC DEA recorded 100 three pointers in his career.
- On February 11, 2023, Lin Ping-Sheng of the New Taipei CTBC DEA and Jason Brickman of the Kaohsiung Aquas all recorded 100 steals in their career.
- On February 25, 2023, Chen Ching-Huan of the Tainan TSG GhostHawks recorded 3,500 points in his career.
- On February 25, 2023, Mindaugas Kupšas of the Kaohsiung Aquas recorded 1,000 points in T1 League career.
- On February 28, 2023, the T1 League held the first All-Star Game since the past 20 years of Taiwanese professional basketball history.
- On March 4, 2023, Ma I-Hung, the interim head coach of the Tainan TSG GhostHawks, became the first female head coach and got first win in Taiwanese professional basketball history.
- On March 7, 2023, Mohammad Al Bachir Gadiaga of the New Taipei CTBC DEA acquired the FIBA local player eligibility.
- On March 8, 2023, Hsieh Ya-Hsuan of the New Taipei CTBC DEA became the first player to award the two straight MVP of the Month awards in T1 League history.
- On March 8, 2023, Jason Brickman of the Kaohsiung Aquas became the first player in T1 League history to record 500 assists in his career.
- On April 4, 2023, Mohammad Al Bachir Gadiaga of the New Taipei CTBC DEA became the first local player to record 1,000 points in T1 League history.
- On April 25, 2023, the T1 League hired 2 foreign referees for officiating since play-in series.
- On April 25, 2023, the game matched by the TaiwanBeer HeroBears and the Taichung Suns became the first overtime play-in game in T1 League history.
- On April 25, 2023, Rayvonte Rice of the Taichung Suns became the first player to record triple-double (with 44 points, 12 rebounds, and 11 assists) during the play-in series in T1 League history.
- On April 26, 2023, Deyonta Davis of the Taoyuan Leopards became the first player to award the two straight Blocks Leader awards in T1 League history.
- On April 27, 2023, Taichung Suns became the first team to qualify semifinals series with lower seed in T1 League history.
- On April 29, 2023, New Taipei CTBC DEA became the first team to award the two straight Best Home-Court of the Year awards in T1 League history.
- On May 10, 2023, Lin Ping-Sheng of the New Taipei CTBC DEA, Deyonta Davis of the Taoyuan Leopards, and Hu Long-Mao of the Kaohsiung Aquas became the players to award the two straight All-Defensive First Team awards in T1 League history.
- On May 11, 2023, Mohammad Al Bachir Gadiaga of the New Taipei CTBC DEA, Chiang Yu-An of the TaiwanBeer HeroBears, and Jason Brickman of the Kaohsiung Aquas became the players to award the two straight All-T1 League First Team awards in T1 League history.
- On May 21, 2023, Tseng Wen-Ting of the New Taipei CTBC DEA became the first player to win the championship of three Taiwanese related basketball league (SBL, PLG, and T1).
- On May 21, 2023, Lee Hsueh-Lin of the New Taipei CTBC DEA became the first player to win the championship of the SBL, CBA, and T1 League.
- On May 21, 2023, New Taipei CTBC DEA became the first team to win the whole 19 home games of regular season (15 games), semifinals series (2 games), and finals series (2 games) during one season in T1 League history. And CTBC Financial Holding, ownership of the CTBC Brothers and New Taipei CTBC DEA, became the first company to win the championship of the Taiwanese professional baseball and basketball (CTBC Brothers in 2021 and New Taipei CTBC DEA in 2023). Liu Chih-Wei, general manager of the CTBC Brothers and New Taipei CTBC DEA, also became the first champion general manager of the Taiwanese professional baseball and basketball (named as general manager of the CTBC Brothers since 2017 and New Taipei CTBC DEA since 2022).
- On June 1, 2023, Yu Jung became the first referee to award the two straight Referees of the Year awards in T1 League history.

== See also ==
- 2022–23 Kaohsiung Aquas season
- 2022–23 New Taipei CTBC DEA season
- 2022–23 Taichung Suns season
- 2022–23 Tainan TSG GhostHawks season
- 2022–23 TaiwanBeer HeroBears season
- 2022–23 Taoyuan Leopards season
