= 2022–23 Tainan TSG GhostHawks season =

Taiwanese professional basketball season

- President: Wang Chiung-Fen
- General Manager: Chien Wei-Cheng
- Head Coach: Liu Meng-Chu; Ma I-Hung (interim)
- Arena: Chia Nan University of Pharmacy and Science Shao Tsung Gymnasium

T1 League results
- Record: 19–11 (63.3%)
- Place: 2nd
- Playoffs finish: Finals (lost to DEA, 0–4)

Player records
- Points: Robert Upshaw 21.8
- Rebounds: Sim Bhullar 12.5
- Assists: Li Han-Sheng 5.1

The 2022–23 Tainan TSG GhostHawks season was the franchise's second season, its second season in the T1 League.

On July 6, 2022, the GhostHawks promoted Liu Meng-Chu, the interim head coach of the Tainan TSG GhostHawks, as their new head coach. On March 3, 2023, the GhostHawks named Ma I-Hung, the assistant coach of the Tainan TSG GhostHawks, as their interim head coach for one game since Liu Meng-Chu coached UCH basketball team for University Basketball Association (UBA) 2022–23 season quarterfinals series. On March 24, the GhostHawks named Ma I-Hung as their interim head coach for one game since Liu Meng-Chu coached UCH basketball team for UBA 2022–23 season semifinals series.

== Draft ==
Round	Player	Position(s)	School / club team
1	Ku Mao Wei-Chia	Guard	UCH
1	Han Chieh-Yu	Forward / center	NTSU

- Reference：

On June 23, 2022, the T1 League announced that the fifth place, Taoyuan Leopards, and the sixth place, Tainan TSG GhostHawks, in the 2021–22 season acquired two selections in the first round.

== Roster ==
2022–23 Tainan TSG GhostHawks roster
Players
Coaches

Pos.	No.	Nat.	Name	Ht.	Wt.	Age	From
SF	0	(Taiwan)	Chang Wei-Hsiang	1.90 m (6 ft 3 in)	90 kg (198 lb)	27 – 15 May 1996	NTUA
SG	2	(Taiwan)	Chien Wei-Ju	1.86 m (6 ft 1 in)	85 kg (187 lb)	31 – 20 January 1992	NTNU
PG	3	(Taiwan)	Ku Mao Wei-Chia	1.75 m (5 ft 9 in)	68 kg (150 lb)	23 – 4 December 1999	UCH
PG	4	(Taiwan)	Li Han-Sheng	1.77 m (5 ft 10 in)	76 kg (168 lb)	28 – 24 October 1994	NTNU
SF	6	(Taiwan)	Liu Chun-Ting	1.87 m (6 ft 2 in)	75 kg (165 lb)	24 – 31 March 1999	UCH
G	9	(Taiwan)	Wu Yen-Lun	1.82 m (6 ft 0 in)	72 kg (159 lb)	25 – 18 June 1997	ISU
F	10	(Taiwan)	Tsai Chien-Yu	1.87 m (6 ft 2 in)	95 kg (209 lb)	26 – 19 September 1996	CKU
PF	12	(Taiwan)	Hu Kai-Hsiang	1.90 m (6 ft 3 in)	93 kg (205 lb)	32 – 16 May 1991	CCU
C	13	(Malta) (Italy)	Samuel Deguara (I)	2.30 m (7 ft 7 in)	116 kg (256 lb)	31 – 21 June 1991	FIU
SG	16	(Taiwan)	Lin Tzu-Feng	1.84 m (6 ft 0 in)	85 kg (187 lb)	24 – 30 October 1998	UCH
C	18	(Taiwan)	Wu Hung-Hsing	2.02 m (6 ft 8 in)	96 kg (212 lb)	33 – 21 October 1989	SRHS
PF	21	(Taiwan)	Lu Kuan-Ting	1.97 m (6 ft 6 in)	100 kg (220 lb)	30 – 13 October 1992	NTUA
SF	23	(Taiwan)	Chen Ching-Huan	1.90 m (6 ft 3 in)	84 kg (185 lb)	37 – 3 February 1986	FJU
PF	29	(Taiwan)	Han Chieh-Yu	1.94 m (6 ft 4 in)	95 kg (209 lb)	23 – 17 December 1999	NTSU
C	35	(Canada)	Sim Bhullar (I)	2.26 m (7 ft 5 in)	140 kg (309 lb)	30 – 2 December 1992	New Mexico State
SF	50	(United States)	Marcus Weathers (I)	1.96 m (6 ft 5 in)	98 kg (216 lb)	25 – 5 August 1997	SMU
C	54	(Taiwan)	Wu Tai-Hao (C)	2.03 m (6 ft 8 in)	108 kg (238 lb)	38 – 7 February 1985	NTNU
C	55	(United States)	Robert Upshaw (I)	2.13 m (7 ft 0 in)	113 kg (249 lb)	29 – 5 January 1994	Washington

Head coach

- (Taiwan) Liu Meng-Chu

Assistant coach(es)

- (Taiwan) Ma I-Hung

Strength & conditioning coach(es)

- (Taiwan) Kuo Han-Po

Athletic trainer(s)

- (Taiwan) Lin Te-Min

Physiotherapist(s)

- (Taiwan) Kuei Shan-Yu

Team manager

- (Taiwan) Chien Wei-Cheng

Legend

- (C) Team captain
- (I) Import player
- Injured

- Roster
Updated: March 25, 2023

== MaGung Food Invitational Game ==
=== Game log ===
Recap

August 1, 2022
19:00 (UTC+8)

Tainan TSG GhostHawks	83–76	I-Shou University

Penghu County Gymnasium, Penghu County

Recap

August 2, 2022
17:40 (UTC+8)

Hsing Wu University	63–102	Tainan TSG GhostHawks

Penghu County Gymnasium, Penghu County

Recap

August 3, 2022
15:20 (UTC+8)

Tainan TSG GhostHawks	80–60	National Kaohsiung Normal University

Penghu County Gymnasium, Penghu County

Recap

August 4, 2022
10:10 (UTC+8)

National Chiao Tung University	45–97	Tainan TSG GhostHawks

Penghu County Gymnasium, Penghu County

Recap

August 5, 2022
15:20 (UTC+8)

Chien Hsin University of Science and Technology	64–84	Tainan TSG GhostHawks

Penghu County Gymnasium, Penghu County

== 2022 interleague play ==
On September 16, 2022, Tainan TSG GhostHawks announced that Huang Hsuan joined to the team as the player in these invitational games.

=== Standings ===
Pos	Team	Pld	W	L	PCT	GB	Qualification
1	TaiwanBeer HeroBears	5	5	0	1.000	—	Advance to Quarterfinals
2	Chinese Taipei National Training Team	5	4	1	.800	1	Advance to Quarterfinals
3	Tainan TSG GhostHawks	5	3	2	.600	2	
4	Yulon Luxgen Dinos	5	2	3	.400	3	
5	PLG RISING STARS	5	1	4	.200	4	
6	Changhua BLL	5	0	5	.000	5	

Source: Official website

=== Group match ===
September 18, 2022	Tainan TSG GhostHawks	89–92(OT)	Chinese Taipei National Training Team	Taipei City
19:00 (UTC+8)	Scoring by quarter: 25–13, 25–25, 11–21, 17–19, Overtime: 11–14
	Pts: Ku Mao Wei-Chia 24; Rebs: Ku Mao Wei-Chia 9 Asts: Li Han-Sheng 5	boxscore	Pts: William Artino 20; Rebs: William Artino 17; Asts: Kao Chin-Wei 5	Arena: Taipei Heping Basketball Gymnasium

September 19, 2022	TaiwanBeer HeroBears	99–85	Tainan TSG GhostHawks	Taipei City
15:00 (UTC+8)	Scoring by quarter: 30–22, 24–17, 26–21, 19–25
	Pts: Chiang Yu-An 23; Rebs: Chou Po-Hsun 16; Asts: Chou Po-Hsun 4	boxscore	Pts: Ku Mao Wei-Chia 19; Rebs: Wu Hung-Hsing 9 Asts: Li Han-Sheng 8	Arena: Taipei Heping Basketball Gymnasium

September 20, 2022	Tainan TSG GhostHawks	97–79	Changhua BLL	Taipei City
15:00 (UTC+8)	Scoring by quarter: 35–21, 25–19, 25–24, 12–18
	Pts: Ku Mao Wei-Chia 24; Rebs: Wu Hung-Hsing 13; Asts: Li Han-Sheng 10	boxscore	Pts: Chu En-Lin 20; Rebs: Huang Chien-Chih 7 Asts: Chen Yi-Lun 10	Arena: Taipei Heping Basketball Gymnasium

September 21, 2022	PLG RISING STARS	89–107	Tainan TSG GhostHawks	Taipei City
17:00 (UTC+8)	Scoring by quarter: 21–28, 22–29, 29–30, 17–20
	Pts: Lan Shao-Fu 16; Rebs: Chen Chun-Nan 5 Asts: Pai Yao-Cheng 7	boxscore	Pts: Ku Mao Wei-Chia 24; Rebs: Han Chieh-Yu 10; Asts: Li Han-Sheng 6	Arena: Taipei Heping Basketball Gymnasium

September 23, 2022	Yulon Luxgen Dinos	77–82	Tainan TSG GhostHawks	Taipei City
13:00 (UTC+8)	Scoring by quarter: 27–15, 21–22, 9–20, 20–25
	Pts: Sarr Cheikh Ahmadou Bamba 35; Rebs: Sarr Cheikh Ahmadou Bamba 17; Asts: Chou Shih-Yuan, Weng Chia-Hung 5	boxscore	Pts: Ku Mao Wei-Chia 18; Rebs: Wu Hung-Hsing 7 Asts: Ku Mao Wei-Chia 6	Arena: Taipei Heping Basketball Gymnasium

=== Quarterfinals ===
September 25, 2022	Bank of Taiwan	86–108	Tainan TSG GhostHawks	Taipei City
13:00 (UTC+8)	Scoring by quarter: 19–27, 21–31, 23–25, 23–25
	Pts: Chou Jih-Teng 20; Rebs: Chen Chun-Han 8 Asts: three players 6	boxscore	Pts: Li Han-Sheng 22; Rebs: Hu Kai-Hsiang 11; Asts: Ku Mao Wei-Chia 9	Arena: Taipei Heping Basketball Gymnasium

=== Semifinals ===
September 26, 2022	Tainan TSG GhostHawks	87–89	TaiwanBeer HeroBears	Taipei City
19:00 (UTC+8)	Scoring by quarter: 19–20, 17–26, 26–19, 25–24
	Pts: Ku Mao Wei-Chia 17; Rebs: Wu Tai-Hao 9 Asts: Ku Mao Wei-Chia 8	boxscore	Pts: Lee Chi-Wei 30; Rebs: Fan Shih-En 8 Asts: Chiang Yu-An 7	Arena: Taipei Heping Basketball Gymnasium

=== Third-place match ===
September 27, 2022	Chinese Taipei National Training Team	96–84	Tainan TSG GhostHawks	Taipei City
17:00 (UTC+8)	Scoring by quarter: 33–19, 18–27, 26–20, 19–18
	Pts: William Artino 27; Rebs: William Artino 13; Asts: Kao Chin-Wei 8	boxscore	Pts: Lu Chi-Erh, Ku Mao Wei-Chia 21; Rebs: Wu Tai-Hao 7 Asts: Ku Mao Wei-Chia 8	Arena: Taipei Heping Basketball Gymnasium

== Preseason ==
Akeme Smart joined to the team as the testing player in these preseason games.

=== Game log ===
2022 preseason game log
Total: 2–0 (home: 1–0; road: 1–0)
Preseason : 2–0 (home: 1–0; road: 1–0)

Game	Date	Team	Score	High points	High rebounds	High assists	Location Attendance	Record
1	October 14	@ Suns	W 115–86	Samuel Deguara (31)	Samuel Deguara (17)	Hu Kai-Hsiang (7)	Xinzhuang Gymnasium	1–0
2	October 15	HeroBears	W 118–114	Taylor Braun (38)	Akeme Smart (23)	Ku Mao Wei-Chia (8)	Xinzhuang Gymnasium; 3,145	2–0

Color： Win Lose
Schedule

== Regular season ==
=== Standings ===
Pos	Team	Pld	W	L	PCT	GB	Qualification
1	New Taipei CTBC DEA	30	25	5	.833	—	Advance to semifinals
2	Tainan TSG GhostHawks	30	19	11	.633	6	Advance to semifinals
3	Kaohsiung Aquas	30	16	14	.533	9	Advance to semifinals
4	TaiwanBeer HeroBears	30	16	14	.533	9	Advance to play-in
5	Taichung Suns	30	8	22	.267	17	Advance to play-in
6	Taoyuan Leopards	30	6	24	.200	19	

Source: T1 League

=== Game log ===
2022–23 regular season game log
Total: 19–11 (home: 12–3; road: 7–8)
October : 0–1 (home: 0–0; road: 0–1)

Game	Date	Team	Score	High points	High rebounds	High assists	Location Attendance	Record
1	October 30	@ DEA	L 98–101	Samuel Deguara (32)	Samuel Deguara (19)	Taylor Braun (5)	Xinzhuang Gymnasium; 3,939	0–1

November : 1–2 (home: 1–1; road: 0–1)

Game	Date	Team	Score	High points	High rebounds	High assists	Location Attendance	Record
2	November 12	DEA	L 104–107	Samuel Deguara (27)	Robert Upshaw (8)	Hu Kai-Hsiang (6)	Chia Nan University of Pharmacy and Science Shao Tsung Gymnasium; 2,200	0–2
3	November 13	Leopards	W 114–100	Samuel Deguara (20); Ku Mao Wei-Chia (20)	Robert Upshaw (10)	Taylor Braun (6)	Chia Nan University of Pharmacy and Science Shao Tsung Gymnasium; 1,857	1–2
4	November 26	@ Suns	L 93–96	Samuel Deguara (25)	Samuel Deguara (10)	Li Han-Sheng (7)	National Taiwan University of Sport Gymnasium; 1,831	1–3

December : 5–2 (home: 4–0; road: 1–2)

Game	Date	Team	Score	High points	High rebounds	High assists	Location Attendance	Record
5	December 4	@ HeroBears	L 108–112	Robert Upshaw (30)	Samuel Deguara (16)	Taylor Braun (8)	University of Taipei Tianmu Campus Gymnasium; 2,226	1–4
6	December 10	HeroBears	W 120–99	Samuel Deguara (30)	Robert Upshaw (12)	Hu Kai-Hsiang (8)	Chia Nan University of Pharmacy and Science Shao Tsung Gymnasium; 1,023	2–4
7	December 11	Aquas	W 119–118 (2OT)	Ku Mao Wei-Chia (24)	Samuel Deguara (14)	Li Han-Sheng (10)	Chia Nan University of Pharmacy and Science Shao Tsung Gymnasium; 1,051	3–4
8	December 16	@ Leopards	W 87–78	Robert Upshaw (19)	Samuel Deguara (12)	Li Han-Sheng (6)	National Taiwan Sport University Arena; 15,050	4–4
9	December 18	@ DEA	L 93–101	Hu Kai-Hsiang (19)	Sim Bhullar (12)	Hu Kai-Hsiang (5); Robert Upshaw (5)	Xinzhuang Gymnasium; 3,108	4–5
10	December 24	Leopards	W 105–96	Robert Upshaw (27)	Robert Upshaw (14)	Li Han-Sheng (10)	Chia Nan University of Pharmacy and Science Shao Tsung Gymnasium; 2,200	5–5
11	December 25	Suns	W 106–95	Lu Kuan-Ting (27)	Sim Bhullar (11)	Li Han-Sheng (6)	Chia Nan University of Pharmacy and Science Shao Tsung Gymnasium; 1,013	6–5

January : 2–2 (home: 1–1; road: 1–1)

Game	Date	Team	Score	High points	High rebounds	High assists	Location Attendance	Record
12	January 1	@ HeroBears	L 109–112	Samuel Deguara (30)	Samuel Deguara (14); Sim Bhullar (14)	Li Han-Sheng (9)	University of Taipei Tianmu Campus Gymnasium; 2,075	6–6
13	January 7	@ Aquas	W 101–92	Ku Mao Wei-Chia (19)	Samuel Deguara (15)	Robert Upshaw (6)	Kaohsiung Arena; 3,128	7–6
14	January 14	DEA	L 111–116	Sim Bhullar (26)	Robert Upshaw (20)	Hu Kai-Hsiang (7)	Chia Nan University of Pharmacy and Science Shao Tsung Gymnasium; 1,100	7–7
15	January 15	HeroBears	W 105–102	Samuel Deguara (22)	Samuel Deguara (22)	Hu Kai-Hsiang (8)	Chia Nan University of Pharmacy and Science Shao Tsung Gymnasium; 935	8–7

February : 3–1 (home: 1–0; road: 2–1)

Game	Date	Team	Score	High points	High rebounds	High assists	Location Attendance	Record
16	February 5	@ Aquas	L 90–118	Robert Upshaw (33)	Sim Bhullar (12)	Hu Kai-Hsiang (4); Ku Mao Wei-Chia (4)	Kaohsiung Arena; 3,796	8–8
17	February 12	@ HeroBears	W 120–110	Sim Bhullar (34)	Sim Bhullar (13)	Robert Upshaw (8)	University of Taipei Tianmu Campus Gymnasium; 1,221	9–8
18	February 19	Suns	W 135–104	Robert Upshaw (33)	Robert Upshaw (21)	Ku Mao Wei-Chia (9)	Chia Nan University of Pharmacy and Science Shao Tsung Gymnasium; 1,314	10–8
19	February 25	@ Suns	W 91–84	Robert Upshaw (20)	Robert Upshaw (21)	Chen Ching-Huan (6)	National Taiwan University of Sport Gymnasium; 1,863	11–8

March : 4–1 (home: 2–0; road: 2–1)

Game	Date	Team	Score	High points	High rebounds	High assists	Location Attendance	Record
20	March 4	Aquas	W 107–100	Robert Upshaw (27)	Robert Upshaw (18)	Chien Wei-Ju (6)	Chia Nan University of Pharmacy and Science Shao Tsung Gymnasium; 1,185	12–8
21	March 5	HeroBears	W 111–95	Robert Upshaw (32)	Sim Bhullar (17)	Hu Kai-Hsiang (10)	Chia Nan University of Pharmacy and Science Shao Tsung Gymnasium; 1,249	13–8
22	March 12	@ Aquas	W 106–94	Robert Upshaw (30)	Sim Bhullar (16)	Hu Kai-Hsiang (5); Wu Yen-Lun (5)	Kaohsiung Arena; 5,188	14–8
23	March 18	@ Suns	W 93–91	Sim Bhullar (19)	Robert Upshaw (21)	Ku Mao Wei-Chia (8)	National Taiwan University of Sport Gymnasium; 1,626	15–8
24	March 25	@ Leopards	L 97–107	Samuel Deguara (23)	Robert Upshaw (22)	Ku Mao Wei-Chia (7)	National Taiwan Sport University Arena; 10,082	15–9

April : 4–2 (home: 3–1; road: 1–1)

Game	Date	Team	Score	High points	High rebounds	High assists	Location Attendance	Record
25	April 1	Aquas	W 108–91	Robert Upshaw (29)	Samuel Deguara (14)	Li Han-Sheng (8)	Chia Nan University of Pharmacy and Science Shao Tsung Gymnasium; 1,150	16–9
26	April 2	Suns	W 118–97	Samuel Deguara (32)	Sim Bhullar (18)	Li Han-Sheng (8)	Chia Nan University of Pharmacy and Science Shao Tsung Gymnasium; 920	17–9
27	April 9	@ Leopards	W 92–84	Robert Upshaw (24)	Robert Upshaw (14)	Chen Ching-Huan (8)	National Taiwan Sport University Arena; 7,200	18–9
28	April 15	Leopards	W 108–65	Marcus Weathers (25)	Marcus Weathers (16)	Li Han-Sheng (7)	Chia Nan University of Pharmacy and Science Shao Tsung Gymnasium; 1,609	19–9
29	April 16	DEA	L 105–114	Robert Upshaw (26)	Sim Bhullar (12)	Chien Wei-Ju (7); Robert Upshaw (7)	Chia Nan University of Pharmacy and Science Shao Tsung Gymnasium; 1,703	19–10
30	April 22	@ DEA	L 102–114	Samuel Deguara (36)	Samuel Deguara (19)	Li Han-Sheng (5)	Xinzhuang Gymnasium; 3,911	19–11

Color： Win Lose
Schedule

== Playoffs ==
=== Game log ===
2023 playoffs game log
Total: 3–6 (home: 2–3; road: 1–3)
Semifinals : 3–2 (home: 2–1; road: 1–1)

Game	Date	Team	Score	High points	High rebounds	High assists	Location Attendance	Series
1	April 28	Aquas	W 117–103	Robert Upshaw (28)	Robert Upshaw (11)	Li Han-Sheng (8)	Chia Nan University of Pharmacy and Science Shao Tsung Gymnasium; 1,004	1–0
2	April 30	Aquas	L 103–124	Ku Mao Wei-Chia (24)	Samuel Deguara (11); Sim Bhullar (11)	Li Han-Sheng (4); Ku Mao Wei-Chia (4)	Chia Nan University of Pharmacy and Science Shao Tsung Gymnasium; 1,507	1–1
3	May 3	@ Aquas	W 97–88	Samuel Deguara (28)	Samuel Deguara (17)	Ku Mao Wei-Chia (6)	Kaohsiung Arena; 4,838	2–1
4	May 5	@ Aquas	L 98–99	Robert Upshaw (27)	Robert Upshaw (17)	Hu Kai-Hsiang (7)	Kaohsiung Arena; 6,166	2–2
5	May 8	Aquas	W 105–99	Robert Upshaw (27)	Sim Bhullar (21)	Ku Mao Wei-Chia (8)	Chia Nan University of Pharmacy and Science Shao Tsung Gymnasium; 2,064	3–2

Finals : 0–4 (home: 0–2; road: 0–2)

Game	Date	Team	Score	High points	High rebounds	High assists	Location Attendance	Series
1	May 13	@ DEA	L 110–117	Robert Upshaw (23)	Robert Upshaw (17)	Ku Mao Wei-Chia (9)	Xinzhuang Gymnasium; 4,059	0–1
2	May 15	@ DEA	L 98–108	Sim Bhullar (22)	Sim Bhullar (18)	Hu Kai-Hsiang (5)	Xinzhuang Gymnasium; 3,622	0–2
3	May 19	DEA	L 96–112	Robert Upshaw (18); Marcus Weathers (18)	Marcus Weathers (14)	Robert Upshaw (5)	Chia Nan University of Pharmacy and Science Shao Tsung Gymnasium; 2,065	0–3
4	May 21	DEA	L 93–120	Robert Upshaw (20)	Sim Bhullar (14)	Ku Mao Wei-Chia (9)	Chia Nan University of Pharmacy and Science Shao Tsung Gymnasium; 2,065	0–4

Color： Win Lose
Schedule

== Player statistics ==
Legend
GP	Games played	MPG	Minutes per game	FG%	Field goal percentage
3P%	3-point field goal percentage	FT%	Free throw percentage	RPG	Rebounds per game
APG	Assists per game	SPG	Steals per game	BPG	Blocks per game
PPG	Points per game		Led the league

=== Regular season ===
Player	GP	MPG	PPG	FG%	3P%	FT%	RPG	APG	SPG	BPG
Chang Wei-Hsiang	3	7:05	1.3	66.7%	0.0%	0.0%	1.0	0.0	0.0	0.3
Chien Wei-Ju	30	30:45	10.3	36.9%	34.5%	56.4%	3.6	2.9	1.1	0.1
Ku Mao Wei-Chia	25	26:55	13.3	40.9%	35.7%	75.6%	3.0	4.6	1.0	0.0
Li Han-Sheng	29	26:38	8.1	34.1%	32.4%	69.6%	4.0	5.1	1.2	0.0
Liu Chun-Ting	9	3:00	1.2	62.5%	50.0%	0.0%	0.6	0.3	0.1	0.0
Shaheed Davis^{≠‡}	1	12:58	5.0	22.2%	33.3%	0.0%	4.0	2.0	2.0	0.0
Nick Faust^{≠‡}	3	16:53	13.0	38.2%	35.0%	75.0%	3.7	3.7	1.7	0.0
Wu Yen-Lun^{≠}	12	14:23	4.3	43.2%	37.5%	100.0%	2.5	2.1	0.3	0.0
Tsai Chien-Yu	4	3:55	0.8	33.3%	50.0%	0.0%	0.8	0.0	0.0	0.0
Hu Kai-Hsiang	29	32:11	10.7	33.5%	28.1%	84.6%	4.2	4.8	1.1	0.0
Samuel Deguara	26	31:06	20.4	70.0%	0.0%	78.9%	11.6	1.2	0.5	0.7
Lin Tzu-Feng	1	4:50	3.0	33.3%	50.0%	0.0%	1.0	1.0	1.0	0.0
Sedrick Barefield^{‡}	1	3:04	0.0	0.0%	0.0%	0.0%	1.0	0.0	0.0	0.0
Wu Hung-Hsing	16	4:09	0.9	77.8%	0.0%	50.0%	1.1	0.1	0.0	0.0
Lu Kuan-Ting	21	6:55	2.6	36.7%	35.7%	57.1%	1.1	0.7	0.1	0.0
Chen Ching-Huan^{≠}	15	25:58	3.5	28.6%	25.0%	83.3%	2.7	2.9	0.6	0.3
Taylor Braun^{‡}	7	32:51	11.3	42.4%	42.6%	81.8%	5.9	3.9	0.7	0.1
Han Chieh-Yu	15	8:39	4.0	44.4%	38.2%	63.6%	1.1	0.1	0.3	0.0
Sim Bhullar^{≠}	22	32:09	19.2	69.0%	100.0%	56.1%	12.5	1.4	0.3	1.7
Marcus Weathers^{≠}	4	25:15	17.8	46.4%	33.3%	61.9%	8.0	1.3	1.3	0.3
Wu Tai-Hao	18	10:46	1.2	22.2%	27.3%	100.0%	1.8	0.9	0.2	0.0
Robert Upshaw^{≠}	25	34:41	21.8	46.5%	35.0%	67.5%	12.0	3.3	0.3	1.5
Lu Chi-Erh	Did not play									
Lung Hung-Yuan	Did not play									

^{‡} Left during the season
^{≠} Acquired during the season

=== Semifinals ===
Player	GP	MPG	PPG	FG%	3P%	FT%	RPG	APG	SPG	BPG
Chang Wei-Hsiang	Did not play									
Chien Wei-Ju	5	28:51	6.8	31.6%	18.2%	85.7%	3.4	2.4	0.8	0.2
Ku Mao Wei-Chia	5	29:08	15.0	42.6%	31.6%	87.9%	4.0	5.2	0.8	0.0
Li Han-Sheng	5	18:58	3.8	31.8%	50.0%	33.3%	2.2	3.0	1.0	0.0
Liu Chun-Ting	Did not play									
Wu Yen-Lun	3	4:26	0.7	0.0%	0.0%	100.0%	0.3	0.3	0.0	0.0
Tsai Chien-Yu	Did not play									
Hu Kai-Hsiang	5	29:42	8.0	29.2%	23.8%	87.5%	2.8	4.8	0.4	0.2
Samuel Deguara	5	25:01	16.8	72.9%	0.0%	63.6%	11.0	2.2	0.2	0.8
Lin Tzu-Feng	Did not play									
Wu Hung-Hsing	Did not play									
Lu Kuan-Ting	Did not play									
Chen Ching-Huan	5	23:31	7.6	54.5%	55.6%	57.1%	0.8	2.8	0.2	0.0
Han Chieh-Yu	5	11:43	4.0	41.7%	33.3%	87.5%	1.6	0.6	0.6	0.0
Sim Bhullar	5	33:48	17.0	60.3%	0.0%	48.4%	12.4	2.4	0.8	2.0
Marcus Weathers	Did not play									
Wu Tai-Hao	3	1:56	0.7	100.0%	0.0%	0.0%	0.0	0.0	0.0	0.0
Robert Upshaw	5	35:25	24.2	58.3%	47.6%	81.8%	10.8	2.4	0.2	1.2

=== Finals ===
Player	GP	MPG	PPG	FG%	3P%	FT%	RPG	APG	SPG	BPG
Chang Wei-Hsiang	Did not play									
Chien Wei-Ju	4	27:58	9.0	34.1%	30.4%	50.0%	3.3	2.0	0.5	0.0
Ku Mao Wei-Chia	4	27:43	12.3	36.2%	28.6%	69.2%	3.3	6.5	1.0	0.0
Li Han-Sheng	4	18:58	4.0	31.6%	25.0%	0.0%	2.3	4.0	0.5	0.0
Liu Chun-Ting	Did not play									
Wu Yen-Lun	1	5:32	0.0	0.0%	0.0%	0.0%	1.0	0.0	0.0	0.0
Tsai Chien-Yu	Did not play									
Hu Kai-Hsiang	4	25:25	9.5	38.5%	32.0%	0.0%	2.0	3.3	1.3	0.0
Samuel Deguara	3	29:46	18.3	66.7%	0.0%	78.6%	11.7	1.3	0.7	0.0
Lin Tzu-Feng	Did not play									
Wu Hung-Hsing	3	2:52	2.7	66.7%	0.0%	0.0%	0.3	0.0	0.0	0.0
Lu Kuan-Ting	2	6:45	3.0	40.0%	40.0%	0.0%	0.0	0.5	0.0	0.0
Chen Ching-Huan	4	13:46	0.0	0.0%	0.0%	0.0%	0.3	1.0	0.0	0.0
Han Chieh-Yu	4	17:58	7.3	34.4%	25.0%	100.0%	3.3	0.3	0.8	0.0
Sim Bhullar	3	34:47	16.0	66.7%	0.0%	54.1%	13.7	1.7	0.3	1.0
Marcus Weathers	3	25:30	16.3	42.5%	10.0%	77.8%	7.7	1.3	1.0	0.7
Wu Tai-Hao	3	7:41	0.7	33.3%	0.0%	0.0%	1.3	0.3	0.0	0.0
Robert Upshaw	3	37:15	20.3	38.8%	35.7%	72.2%	11.0	4.3	1.0	1.7

- Reference：

== Transactions ==
On February 1, 2023, Tainan TSG GhostHawks cancelled the registration of Lu Chi-Erh's playership.

On February 23, 2023, Tainan TSG GhostHawks cancelled the registration of Lung Hung-Yuan's playership.

=== Overview ===
Players added

Via draft

- Han Chieh-Yu
- Ku Mao Wei-Chia

Via free agency

- Sedrick Barefield
- Sim Bhullar
- Taylor Braun
- Chen Ching-Huan
- Chien Wei-Ju
- Shaheed Davis
- Samuel Deguara
- D'Montre Edwards
- Nick Faust
- Hu Kai-Hsiang
- Li Han-Sheng
- Lu Kuan-Ting
- Tsai Chien-Yu
- Robert Upshaw
- Marcus Weathers
- Wu Hung-Hsing
- Wu Tai-Hao
- Wu Yen-Lun
Players lost

Via free agency

- William Artino
- Chang Chia-Jung
- Jordan Chatman
- Chiang Chiao-An
- Charles García
- Marcus Gilbert
- Huang Tsung-Han
- Kao Kuo-Chiang
- Oscar Lin
- Tsai Yao-Hsun
- Tseng Pin-Fu
- Wu Nien-Che

Waived

- Sedrick Barefield
- Taylor Braun
- Shaheed Davis
- D'Montre Edwards
- Nick Faust

=== Free agency ===
==== Additions ====
Date	Player	Contract terms	Former team	Ref.
July 4, 2022	Li Han-Sheng	—N/a	(Taiwan) Kaohsiung Aquas	
July 7, 2022	Lu Kuan-Ting	—N/a	(Taiwan) Kaohsiung Jeoutai Technology	
July 8, 2022	Hu Kai-Hsiang	—N/a	(Taiwan) Yulon Luxgen Dinos	
July 22, 2022	Wu Tai-Hao	—N/a	(Taiwan) Hsinchu JKO Lioneers	
August 1, 2022	Ku Mao Wei-Chia	—N/a	(Taiwan) UCH	
August 1, 2022	Han Chieh-Yu	—N/a	(Taiwan) NTSU	
August 9, 2022	Samuel Deguara	—N/a	(Taiwan) TaiwanBeer HeroBears	
August 11, 2022	Taylor Braun	—N/a	(Taiwan) Kaohsiung Steelers	
August 16, 2022	Wu Hung-Hsing	—N/a	(Taiwan) Kaohsiung Jeoutai Technology	
September 1, 2022	Chien Wei-Ju	—N/a	(Taiwan) Taipei Fubon Braves	
September 28, 2022	D'Montre Edwards	—N/a	(China) Nanjing Tongxi Monkey Kings	
October 11, 2022	Sedrick Barefield	—N/a	(Taiwan) Taipei Fubon Braves	
October 12, 2022	Tsai Chien-Yu	—N/a	(Taiwan) Kaohsiung Jeoutai Technology	
November 10, 2022	Robert Upshaw	—N/a	(Belarus) BC Tsmoki-Minsk	
December 15, 2022	Shaheed Davis	—N/a	(Greece) Lavrio Megabolt	
December 16, 2022	Sim Bhullar	—N/a	(Taiwan) Hsinchu JKO Lioneers	
January 12, 2023	Nick Faust	—N/a	(Taiwan) Formosa Taishin Dreamers	
January 31, 2023	Chen Ching-Huan	—N/a	(Taiwan) Taichung Suns	
February 23, 2023	Wu Yen-Lun	—N/a	(China) Suke Lion	
March 6, 2023	Marcus Weathers	—N/a	(Philippines) NorthPort Batang Pier	

==== Subtractions ====
Date	Player	Reason	New team	Ref.
May 25, 2022	William Artino	Contract expired	(Taiwan) Hsinchu JKO Lioneers	
July 18, 2022	Tsai Yao-Hsun	Contract expired	(Taiwan) HZSH basketball team coach	
August 9, 2022	Kao Kuo-Chiang	Contract expired	(Taiwan) Lioneers Jr. Team coach	
August 18, 2022	Huang Tsung-Han	Contract expired	(Taiwan) Yulon Luxgen Dinos	
August 18, 2022	Tseng Pin-Fu	Contract expired	(Taiwan) Taoyuan Leopards	
August 27, 2022	Marcus Gilbert	Contract expired	(Venezuela) Héroes de Falcón	
August 31, 2022	Chiang Chiao-An	Contract expired	(Taiwan) PIJH basketball team assistant coach	
August 31, 2022	Chang Chia-Jung	Contract expired	—N/a	
August 31, 2022	Oscar Lin	Contract expired	(Taiwan) Kaohsiung 17LIVE Steelers personal skills coach and team interpreter	
September 28, 2022	Jordan Chatman	Contract expired	—N/a	
September 28, 2022	Charles García	Contract expired	(Dominican Republic) Los Prados de Santo Domingo	
October 24, 2022	Wu Nien-Che	Contract expired	Taiwan Beer	
November 7, 2022	D'Montre Edwards	Injury	—N/a	
December 5, 2022	Sedrick Barefield	Contract terminated	(Hong Kong) Bay Area Dragons	
December 30, 2022	Taylor Braun	Injury	(Taiwan) Hsinchu Lioneers	
January 13, 2023	Shaheed Davis	Contract terminated	(Israel) Maccabi Haifa	
March 6, 2023	Nick Faust	Contract terminated	(Venezuela) Spartans Distrito Capital	

== Awards ==
=== Yearly Awards ===
Recipient	Award	Ref.
Ku Mao Wei-Chia	Sixth Man of the Year	
Ku Mao Wei-Chia	Rookie of the Year	

=== All-Star Game Awards ===
Recipient	Award	Ref.
Liu Chun-Ting	Slam Dunk Contest Champion	

=== Import of the Month ===
Month	Recipient	Award	Ref.
January	Samuel Deguara	January Import of the Month	
April	Robert Upshaw	April Import of the Month	
