= Michael Efevberha =

Nigerian-American professional basketball player

Free Agent
- Position: Shooting guard

Personal information
- Born: August 22, 1984 (age 42) Pomona, California, U.S.
- Listed height: 198 cm (6 ft 6 in)
- Listed weight: 88 kg (194 lb)

Career information
- High school: Ganesha (Pomona, California)
- College: UC Irvine (2002–2004); Cal State Northridge (2005–2006)
- NBA draft: 2006: undrafted
- Playing career: 2006–present

Career history
- 2006: Idaho Stampede
- 2007: Santa Barbara Breakers
- 2007–2008: Iowa Energy
- 2008: Anaheim Arsenal
- 2009: Wellington Saints
- 2009–2011: Lugano Tigers
- 2011–2012: Iowa Energy
- 2012: Cocolos de San Pedro de Macorís
- 2012: Spartak Primorye
- 2013: ČEZ Nymburk
- 2013–2015: Sichuan Blue Whales
- 2015–2016: Club Sagesse
- 2016: Jiangsu Hualan
- 2016–2017: Changwon LG Sakers
- 2017: Club Sagesse
- 2017: BBC Monthey
- 2017: Chongqing Sanhai Lanling
- 2017: Anyang KGC
- 2017: Bnei Herzliya
- 2018: Beirut Club
- 2018–2019: Homenetmen Beirut
- 2019: JA Vichy-Clermont Métropole
- 2022–2023: Taoyuan Leopards
- 2023–2024: Hsinchu Toplus Lioneers
- 2025: New Taipei Kings

Career highlights
- P. League+ points leader (2024); T1 League points leader (2023); T1 League All-Star (2023); Czech League champion (2013); Czech Cup winner (2013); 2× Swiss League champion (2010, 2011); Swiss Cup winner (2011); LBL All Star (With Sagesse Club); New Zealand NBL Most Outstanding Guard (2009); New Zealand NBL Scoring Champion (2009); New Zealand NBL All-Star Five (2009) ..

Michael James Efevberha (born August 22, 1984) is a Nigerian-American professional basketball player who last played for the New Taipei Kings of the Basketball Champions League Asia (BCL Asia). He played college basketball for the University of California, Irvine and California State University, Northridge. He has also represented the Nigeria national basketball team, serving as team captain in 2009 at the 2009 FIBA Africa Championship where he averaged 17.4 points, 4.1 rebounds and 2.0 assists per game.

In 2009, Efevberha was named New Zealand NBL Most Outstanding Guard and earned the league's scoring title with 27.8 points per game. He scored over 30 points in a game eight times and reached over the 40-point mark on two occasions. He led the Wellington Saints to the semi-finals, where they were defeated by the Nelson Giants.

On November 18, 2017, Efevberha signed with the Israeli team Bnei Herzliya for the 2017–18 season. However, on December 27, 2017, Efevberha parted ways with Herzliya after appearing in 4 games. On February 12, 2018, Efevberha signed with the Lebanese team Beirut Club , and after losing at the semis versus Riyadi Beirut, Mike signed with Homenetmen Beirut for the 2018–2019 season, Mike signed with sagesse club for the 2019–2020.

On November 21, 2019, he has signed with JA Vichy-Clermont Métropole of the French Pro B.

On November 25, 2022, Efevberha has signed with Taoyuan Leopards of the T1 League. He was the league's points leader for the 2022–23 season.

On August 22, 2024, Efevberha re-signed with the Hsinchu Toplus Lioneers of the Taiwan Professional Basketball League (TPBL). On October 8, the Hsinchu Toplus Lioneers terminated the contract relationship with Efevberha.

On February 7, 2025, Efevberha signed a BCL Asia player contract with the New Taipei Kings of the Basketball Champions League Asia (BCL Asia). On June 10, New Taipei Kings announced that Efevberha left the team.
