= Tony Bishop =

American-born Panamanian basketball player

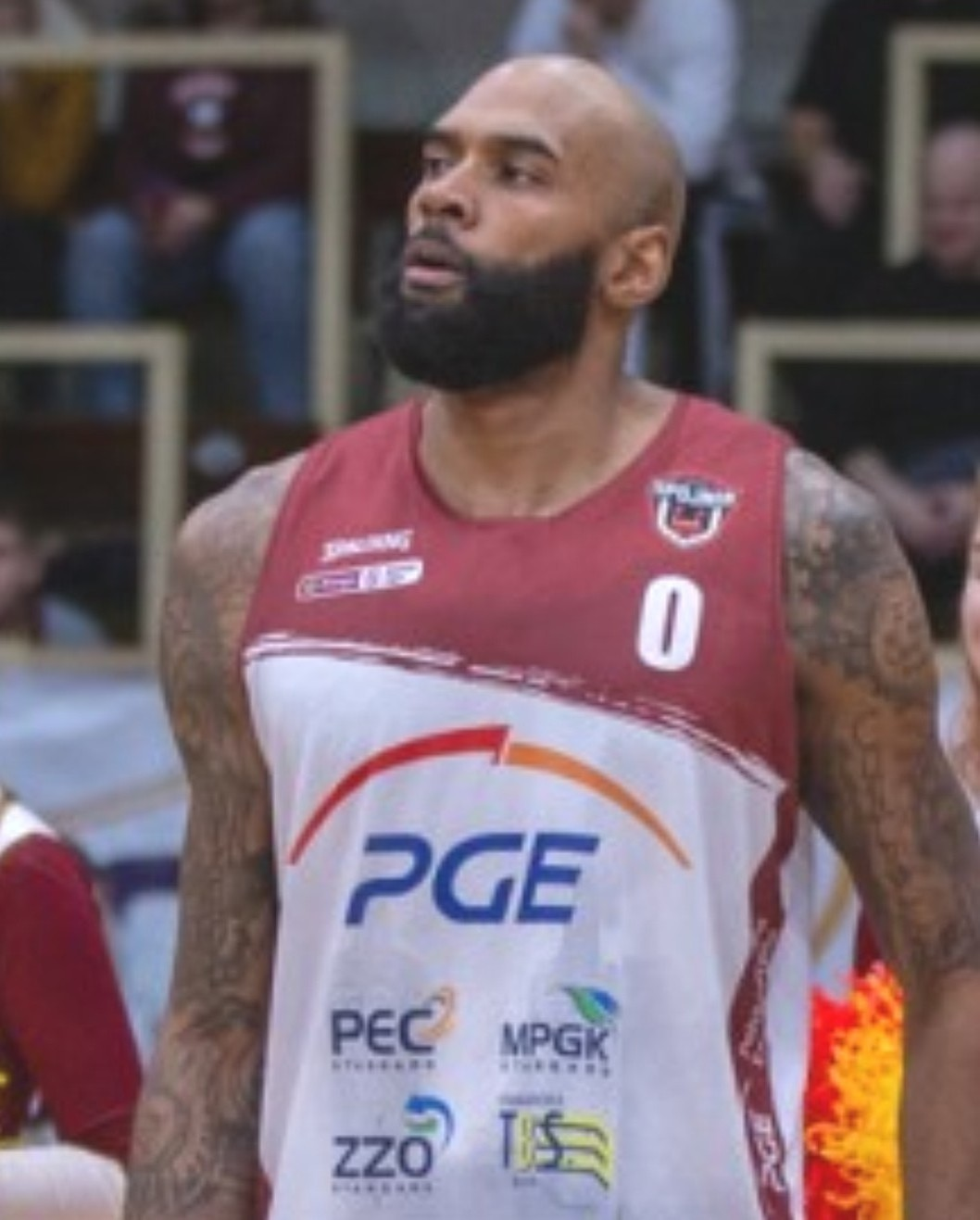
- Bishop with the Spójnia Stargard in 2019

Free Agent
- Position: Power forward

Personal information
- Born: July 16, 1989 (age 37) Dallas, Texas, U.S.
- Listed height: 6 ft 8 in (2.03 m)
- Listed weight: 220 lb (100 kg)

Career information
- High school: Rowlett (Rowlett, Texas)
- College: Richland College (2007–2009); Texas State (2009–2011)
- NBA draft: 2011: undrafted
- Playing career: 2011–present

Career history
- 2011–2012: Aalborg Vikings
- 2012–2013: Nevėžis
- 2013–2015: Rio Grande Valley Vipers
- 2015: Atléticos de San Germán
- 2015–2016: Eisbären Bremerhaven
- 2016: Atléticos de San Germán
- 2016: Correcaminos de Colón
- 2016–2017: Kanazawa Samuraiz
- 2017–2018: Bakken Bears
- 2018–2019: BCM U Pitesti
- 2019–2020: Spójnia Stargard
- 2020–2021: BCM U Pitesti
- 2021: Cangrejeros de Santurce
- 2021: Mets de Guaynabo
- 2021–2022: Meralco Bolts
- 2022: Cangrejeros de Santurce
- 2022–2023: Taichung Suns
- 2023: Real Estelí
- 2023: Atléticos de San Germán
- 2023: Capitanes de Arecibo
- 2023: Halcones de Xalapa
- 2023–2024: Barangay Ginebra San Miguel
- 2024: Real Estelí
- 2024: Vaqueros de Bayamón
- 2024: Atléticos de San Germán
- 2024: Vaqueros de Bayamón

Career highlights
- Danish League champion (2018); Danish Cup champion (2018); Lithuanian League All-Star (2013); Danish League All-Star (2012); All-Danish League Second Team (2012); NJCAA Division III champion (2009); NJCAA Player of the Year (2009); First-team NJCAA All-American (2009)

Tony Cal Bishop Jr. (born July 16, 1989) is an American-born Panamanian professional basketball player who last played for the Vaqueros de Bayamón of the Baloncesto Superior Nacional (BSN). He played college basketball for Texas State University.

== Professional career ==
Bishop went undrafted in the 2011 NBA draft. On September 16, 2011, he signed a one-year deal with the Aalborg Vikings of the Danish Basketball League.

On September 4, 2012, Bishop signed a one-year deal with BC Nevėžis of the Lithuanian Basketball League.

On November 1, 2013, Bishop was selected by the Rio Grande Valley Vipers in the second round of the 2013 NBA Development League Draft. On November 2, 2014, he was reacquired by the Vipers. In April 2015, after the end of the 2014–15 D-League season, he signed with Atléticos de San Germán of Puerto Rico for the rest of the 2015 BSN season.

On July 22, 2015, he signed with Eisbären Bremerhaven of the Basketball Bundesliga. On January 21, 2016, he parted ways with Bremerhaven. Five days later, he signed with the Atléticos de San Germán, returning for a second stint.

Bishop joined the Meralco Bolts of the Philippine Basketball Association in November 2021 as the team's import or foreign player for the 2021 PBA Governors' Cup. On December 22, he scored 36 points in a 83–80 victory over against the TNT Tropang Giga.

On September 30, 2022, Bishop signed with the Taichung Suns of the T1 League. On January 13, 2023, Taichung Suns terminated Bishop's contract.

In October 2023, Bishop returned to the Philippines, this time signing with the Barangay Ginebra San Miguel as the team's import for the 2023–24 PBA Commissioner's Cup.

On March 12, 2024, Bishop signed with Vaqueros de Bayamón, but was waived the next month after four games. On April 15, he re-signed with the Atléticos de San Germán.
