= NTSU Arena =

Sports venue in Guishan, Taoyuan, Taiwan

National Taiwan Sport University Arena
- 國立體育大學綜合體育館
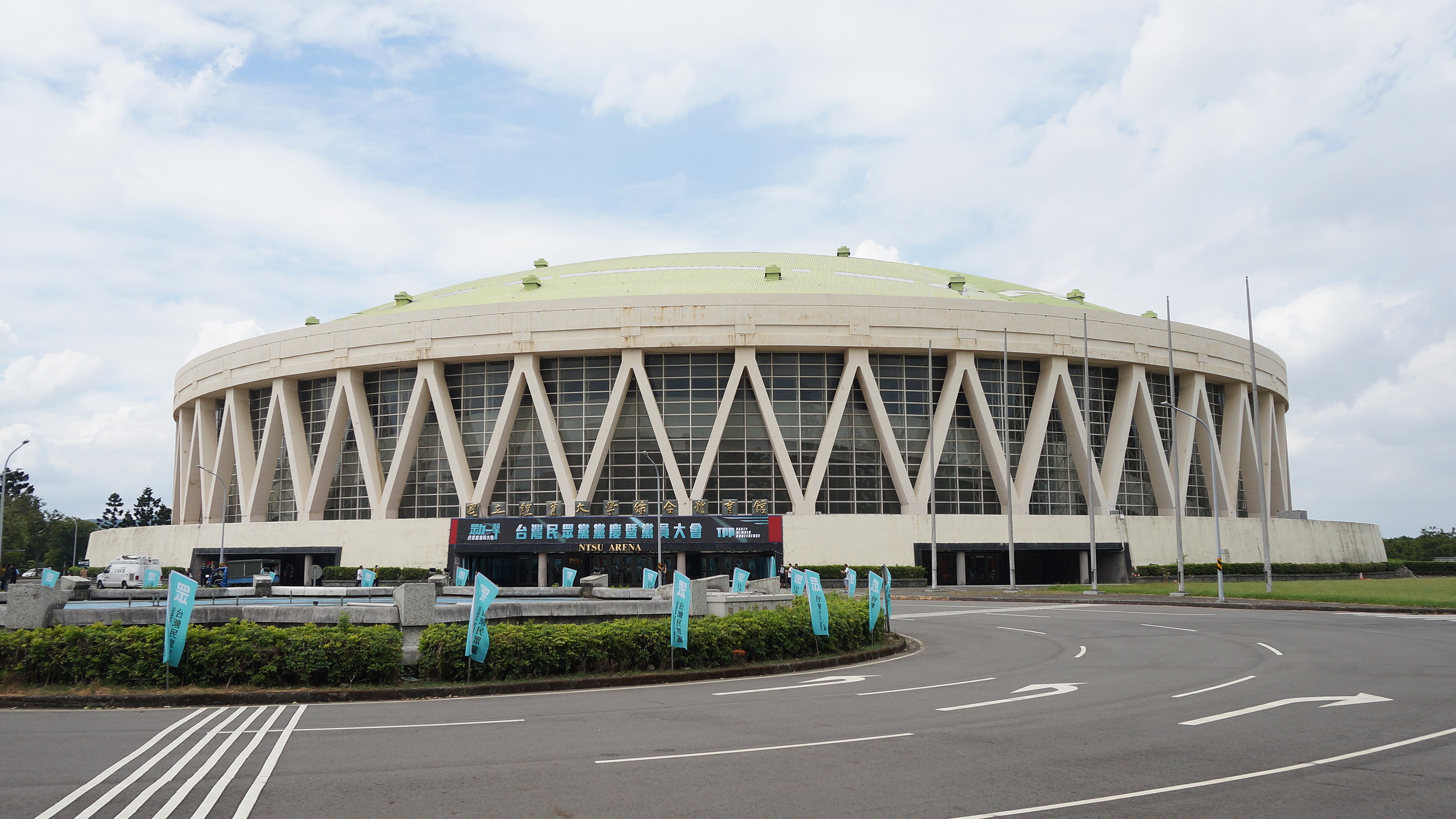
- NTSU Arena in 2020
- Interactive map of National Taiwan Sport University Arena
- Location: Guishan District, Taoyuan, Taiwan
- Coordinates: 25°02′06″N 121°23′01″E
- Owner: National Taiwan Sport University
- Operator: National Taiwan Sport University
- Capacity: 15,000 (sporting events)
- Public transit: Taoyuan Metro: National Taiwan Sport University

Construction
- Groundbreaking: February 1982
- Opened: September 1986
- Architect: Zongmai Architects

Tenant
- Taoyuan Leopards (T1) (2022–2023)

The NTSU Arena (Chinese: 國立體育大學綜合體育館; pinyin: Guólì Tǐyù Dàxué Zònghé Tǐyùguǎn), also known as Linkou Arena or NTSU Multipurpose Gymnasium, is a multi-purpose indoor arena located on the campus of National Taiwan Sport University in Taoyuan, Taiwan. It was opened in September 1986 and is managed by National Taiwan Sport University. The facility has a capacity of around 15,000 seats for sporting events.

== Background and history ==
In response to the Taiwanese government's initiative to promote national sports development, Wang Yung-ching and Wang Yung-tsai, founders of Formosa Plastics, donated land and funds to construct an arena in 1973. In May 1984, the Ministry of Education, recognizing the country's long-term sports development needs, acquired more than 60 hectares of additional land through the expropriation of private land and allocation of state-owned land. This expanded area was designated as the multi-purpose "Linkou Zhongzheng Sports Park."

A sports college was also established to foster athletic talent, oversee park facilities, and fulfill roles in education, training, competition, recreation, and promotional activities. Following the establishment of the National College of Physical Education and Sports on July 1, 1987, the arena was officially transferred to the college's institute for management and operations.

== Description ==
The auditorium is bowl-shaped, divided into upper, middle and lower sections, with about 11,000 fixed seats and about 4,000 movable seats.
