= Robert Upshaw =

American basketball player

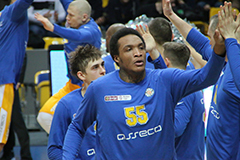
- Upshaw with Arka Gdynia in 2019

Free agent
- Position: Center

Personal information
- Born: January 5, 1994 (age 32) Fresno, California, U.S.
- Listed height: 7 ft 0 in (2.13 m)
- Listed weight: 250 lb (113 kg)

Career information
- High school: San Joaquin Memorial (Fresno, California)
- College: Fresno State (2012–2013); Washington (2014–2015)
- NBA draft: 2015: undrafted
- Playing career: 2015–present

Career history
- 2015–2016: Los Angeles D-Fenders
- 2016: Kalev/Cramo
- 2016–2017: Mayrouba Club
- 2017: Chemidor Tehran
- 2017: Guaros de Lara
- 2017–2018: Champville
- 2018: Yakima SunKings
- 2018–2019: Arka Gdynia
- 2019–2020: Arel Üniversitesi Büyükçekmece
- 2020: Fuenlabrada
- 2020–2021: Al-Ahli
- 2021: Buyuksehir Hastanesi Konyaspor
- 2021: BC Tsmoki-Minsk
- 2022–2023: Tainan TSG GhostHawks
- 2023: Shaanxi Wolves
- 2024: Iğdır Basketbol
- 2024: Seattle Super Hawks
- 2024: Taoyuan Taiwan Beer Leopards
- 2025: Salem Capitals
- 2025: Great Falls Electric
- 2025: Jiangxi Ganchi
- 2025–2026: Suke Lions
- 2026: Blackwater Bossing

Career highlights
- T1 League All-Star (2023); NAPB champion (2018)
- Stats at Basketball Reference

Robert Ridjell Upshaw III (born January 5, 1994) is an American professional basketball player who last played for the Blackwater Bossing of the Philippine Basketball Association (PBA). He played college basketball for the Fresno State Bulldogs and Washington Huskies.

== College career ==
Upshaw played high school basketball for San Joaquin Memorial High School in his hometown of Fresno, California. A top 100 recruit, he originally committed to play college basketball for Kansas State University, but was released from his commitment when Wildcats head coach Frank Martin left for another job. He then chose local Fresno State, where as a freshman in the 2012–13 season he averaged 4.1 points, 3.8 rebounds and 1.8 blocks per game. In the summer after his freshman season, Upshaw was dismissed from the Bulldogs for violations of team rules.

The 7'0" center then transferred to Washington. After sitting out the 2013–14 season per NCAA transfer rules, he played 19 games for the Huskies, averaging 10.9 points, 8.2 rebounds and 4.5 blocks per game. On January 26, 2015, Upshaw was dismissed from the Washington program, again for violations of team rules. He was leading the country in blocked shots per game at the time of his dismissal and had led the Huskies in rebounding.

== Professional career ==
=== Los Angeles D-Fenders (2015–2016) ===
Upshaw declared his eligibility for the 2015 NBA draft rather than transfer to another college program. At the NBA Draft Combine, Upshaw measured as one of the tallest players in attendance (an even seven feet tall in shoes) with the longest standing reach and wingspan. He was projected as a late first-round or early second-round selection, but went undrafted, likely due to his personal issues. In July 2015, he joined the Los Angeles Lakers for the 2015 NBA Summer League, where he averaged a mere 1.4 points and 2.2 rebounds per game. Upshaw felt there was more in him than his Summer League showing, and after dropping 20 pounds, he signed with the Lakers for training camp on September 14, 2015. He was later waived by the Lakers on October 20 after appearing in four preseason games. On October 31, 2015, he was acquired by the Los Angeles D-Fenders of the NBA Development League as an affiliate player of the Lakers. Upshaw received consistent minutes for the D-Fenders throughout the season before losing his spot in the rotation in late February 2016. On March 11, 2016, his contract was terminated by the D-League for violating the league's anti-drug program. In 28 games (two starts) for the D-Fenders in 2015–16, he averaged 7.3 points, 4.5 rebounds and 1.4 blocks in 15.6 minutes per game.

=== BC Kalev/Cramo (2016) ===
On September 1, 2016, Upshaw signed with BC Kalev/Cramo of the Estonian League. He appeared in five games for Kalev/Cramo during October before leaving the team in November due to a knee injury.

=== Mayrouba Club and Chemidor Tehran (2016–2017) ===
After leaving Kalev/Cramo, Upshaw joined Mayrouba Club of the Lebanese Basketball League in late November 2016. He made his debut for Mayrouba in their 2016–17 season opener on December 2. In 18 games for Mayrouba, he averaged 19.7 points, 12.3 rebounds, 1.3 assists 3.6 blocks per game. In April 2017, he joined Iranian team Chemidor Tehran for a three-game stint.

=== Guaros de Lara (2017) ===
In September 2017, Upshaw signed with Guaros de Lara of the Venezuelan Liga Profesional de Baloncesto for the FIBA Intercontinental Cup.

=== Champville (2017–2018) ===
On October 4, 2017, Upshaw signed with Champville of the Lebanese Basketball League. He left the team in February 2018. In 17 games, he averaged 13.4 points, 7.8 rebounds, 1.1 assists and 1.9 blocks per game.

=== Yakima SunKings (2018) ===
In March 2018, Upshaw joined the Yakima SunKings of the North American Premier Basketball. He helped the SunKings win the championship. In five games, he averaged 11.2 points, 7.8 rebounds, 1.0 assists and 3.0 blocks per game.

=== Arka Gdynia (2018–2019) ===
In August 2018, Upshaw signed with Arka Gdynia of the Polish Basketball League and the EuroCup.

=== Arel Üniversitesi Büyükçekmece (2019–2020) ===
On July 19, 2019, Upshaw signed with Arel Üniversitesi Büyükçekmece of the Turkish Basketbol Süper Ligi.

=== Fuenlabrada (2020) ===
On July 2, 2020, Upshaw signed with Fuenlabrada of the Spanish Liga ACB. In three games, he averaged 10.3 points, 4.7 rebounds, 1.3 assists, 1.3 steals and 1.3 blocks per game.

=== Al-Ahli and Buyuksehir Hastanesi Konyaspor (2020–2021) ===
On November 19, 2020, Upshaw signed with Al-Ahli of the Bahraini Premier League. In 10 games, he averaged 25.6 points, 15.5 rebounds, 1.8 assists, 1.1 steals and 2.4 blocks per game. In March 2021, he joined Buyuksehir Hastanesi Konyaspor of the Turkish Basketball First League. In 12 games, he averaged 21.4 points, 8.4 rebounds, 1.6 assists and 1.3 blocks per game.

=== BC Tsmoki-Minsk (2021) ===
On August 23, 2021, Upshaw signed with BC Tsmoki-Minsk of the Belarus Premier League and the VTB United League. He left the team in November 2021.

=== Tainan TSG GhostHawks and Shaanxi Wolves (2022–2023) ===
On November 10, 2022, Upshaw signed with Tainan TSG GhostHawks of the T1 League. In 33 games in the 2022–23 season, he averaged 22.1 points, 11.7 rebounds, 3.2 assists and 1.5 blocks per game.

On July 4, 2023, Upshaw signed with Shaanxi Wolves of the National Basketball League for the 2023 season, which started on July 2.

On July 24, 2023, Upshaw re-signed with the Tainan TSG GhostHawks. His contract was terminated by the GhostHawks on November 20, 2023. He appeared in one game for Tainan to begin the 2023–24 season.

=== Iğdır Basketbol (2024) ===
In February 2024, Upshaw joined Iğdır Basketbol in Turkey. He played six games.

=== Seattle Super Hawks (2024) ===
In May 2024, Upshaw joined the Seattle Super Hawks of The Basketball League.

=== Taoyuan Taiwan Beer Leopards (2024) ===
On August 31, 2024, Upshaw signed with the Taoyuan Taiwan Beer Leopards of the Taiwan Professional Basketball League (TPBL). On December 19, he was released by the Leopards after six games due to a knee injury.

=== Salem Capitals and Great Falls Electric (2025) ===
On March 31, 2025, Upshaw signed with the Salem Capitals of The Basketball League. In May 2025, he left Salem and joined the Great Falls Electric for the rest of The Basketball League season.

=== Jiangxi Ganchi (2025) ===
In June 2025, Upshaw joined Jiangxi Ganchi of the Chinese National Basketball League. In 20 games during the 2025 season, he averaged 20.0 points, 9.6 rebounds, 1.7 assists and 1.1 blocks per game.

=== Suke Lions (2025–2026) ===
In December 2025, Upshaw joined Suke Lions for the 2025–26 Chinese NBL season. In 22 games, he averaged 21.8 points, 10.5 rebounds, 1.8 assists and 1.5 blocks per game.

=== Blackwater Bossing (2026) ===
On March 21, 2026, Upshaw signed with the Blackwater Bossing of the Philippine Basketball Association to replace Daniel Ochefu as its import for the 2026 PBA Commissioner's Cup.
