= Taoyuan Taiwan Beer Leopards all-time roster =

The following is a list of players, both past and current, who appeared at least in one game for the Taoyuan Taiwan Beer Leopards (2024–present), Taiwan Beer Leopards (2023–2024), or Taoyuan Leopards (2021–2023) franchise.

== Players ==
Note: Statistics are correct through the end of the 2025–26 TPBL season.

G	Guard	PG	Point guard	SG	Shooting guard	G/F	Guard-forward	F	Forward	SF	Small forward	PF	Power forward	F/C	Forward-center	C	Center

^{+}	Denotes player who has been selected for at least one All-Star Game with the Taoyuan Taiwan Beer Leopards
^{x}	Denotes player who is currently on the Taoyuan Taiwan Beer Leopards roster
0.0	Denotes the Taoyuan Taiwan Beer Leopards statistics leader (min. 40 games played for the team for per-game statistics)
player	Denotes player who has played for the Taoyuan Taiwan Beer Leopards in the T1

=== C ===
Player	Name	Nat.	Pos.	From	Yrs	Seasons	Statistics									Ref.
Player	Name	Nat.	Pos.	From	Yrs	Seasons	GP	MP	PTS	REB	AST	MPG	PPG	RPG	APG	Ref.
Chang Chao-Chen^{x}	張兆辰	(Taiwan)	F	NTNU	1	2026–present	0	0:00	0	0	0	0:00	0.0	0.0	0.0	
Chang Chih-Feng	張智峰	(Taiwan)	SG	TPEC	1	2021–2022	10	307:22	68	42	27	30:44	6.8	4.2	2.7	
Chang Shun-Cheng	張舜丞	(Taiwan)	SG	UKN	2	2021–2023	22	209:52	31	24	13	9:32	1.4	1.1	0.6	
Chen Chien-Ming	陳建銘	(Taiwan)	G	SHU	1	2022–2023	11	169:07	26	16	19	15:22	2.4	1.5	1.7	
Chen Hsiao-Jung	陳孝榕	(Taiwan)	G	NTUST	2	2022–2024	41	607:24	171	47	41	14:48	4.2	1.1	1.0	
Chen Chun-Han	陳俊翰	(Taiwan)	F	UKN	1	2024–2025	16	25:59	0	6	1	1:37	0.0	0.4	0.1	
Cheng Wei	鄭瑋	(Taiwan)	PG	USC	3	2021–2024	81	1970:49	578	127	173	24:19	7.1	1.6	2.1	
Chiang Yu-An	蔣淯安	(Taiwan)	PG	NTUS	1	2023–2024	20	736:09	311	78	103	36:48	15.6	3.9	5.2	
Kenneth Chien^{x}	錢肯尼	(United States) (Taiwan)	PG	Broward	1	2026–present	0	0:00	0	0	0	0:00	0.0	0.0	0.0	
Chu I-Tsung	朱億宗	(Taiwan)	SF	HWU	1	2023–2024	22	232:19	52	29	13	10:33	2.4	1.3	0.6	
DeMarcus Cousins	卡森斯	(United States)	C	Kentucky	1	2023–2024	7	217:53	159	89	31	31:07	22.7	12.7	4.4	
Chuang Po-Yuan^{x}	莊博元	(Taiwan)	PG	FJU	3	2024–present	61	1107:45	223	72	33	18:09	3.7	1.2	0.5	

=== D ===
Player	Name	Nat.	Pos.	From	Yrs	Seasons	Statistics									Ref.
Player	Name	Nat.	Pos.	From	Yrs	Seasons	GP	MP	PTS	REB	AST	MPG	PPG	RPG	APG	Ref.
Deyonta Davis	戴維斯	(United States)	C	Michigan State	2	2021–2023	44	1320:07	710	553	63	30:00	16.1	12.6	1.4	
Cheick Diallo	迪亞洛	(Mali)	PF	Kansas	1	2025–2026	24	670:57	456	279	34	27:57	19.0	11.6	1.4	
Du Yu-Cheng	杜譽城	(Taiwan)	PF	VNU	1	2021–2022	13	356:32	93	39	21	27:25	7.2	3.0	1.6	

=== E ===
Player	Name	Nat.	Pos.	From	Yrs	Seasons	Statistics									Ref.
Player	Name	Nat.	Pos.	From	Yrs	Seasons	GP	MP	PTS	REB	AST	MPG	PPG	RPG	APG	Ref.
Michael Efevberha^{+}	艾夫伯	(Nigeria) (United States)	G	Cal State Northridge	1	2022–2023	21	803:29	602	171	87	38:15	28.7	8.1	4.1	

=== G ===
Player	Name	Nat.	Pos.	From	Yrs	Seasons	Statistics									Ref.
Player	Name	Nat.	Pos.	From	Yrs	Seasons	GP	MP	PTS	REB	AST	MPG	PPG	RPG	APG	Ref.
Humphery Gabriel^{x}	蓋比	(Nigeria)	SF	VNU	1	2026–present	0	0:00	0	0	0	0:00	0.0	0.0	0.0	
Gao Jin-Wei^{x}	高錦瑋	(Taiwan)	PG	UCH	4	2023–present	99	3607:09	1510	413	538	36:26	15.3	4.2	5.4	
John Gillon	吉倫	(United States)	PG	Syracuse	1	2021–2022	22	755:26	493	114	181	34:20	22.4	5.2	8.2	

=== H ===
Player	Name	Nat.	Pos.	From	Yrs	Seasons	Statistics									Ref.
Player	Name	Nat.	Pos.	From	Yrs	Seasons	GP	MP	PTS	REB	AST	MPG	PPG	RPG	APG	Ref.
Justyn Hamilton	漢密爾頓	(United States)	F	Kent State	1	2023–2024	7	193:17	95	75	5	27:36	13.6	10.7	0.7	
Dwight Howard^{+}	霍華德	(United States)	C	SACA	1	2022–2023	20	687:40	464	323	99	34:23	23.2	16.2	5.0	
Hsu Hong-Wei^{x}	徐宏瑋	(Taiwan)	PG	UCH	2	2025–present	29	161:04	38	8	10	5:33	1.3	0.3	0.3	
Huang Jhen^{x}	黃鎮	(Taiwan)	SF	FJU	4	2023–present	73	1031:04	269	114	66	14:07	3.7	1.6	0.9	
Huang Yi-Sheng	黃奕勝	(Taiwan)	SG	SHU	2	2021–2023	30	272:43	28	11	6	9:05	0.9	0.4	0.2	

=== J ===
Player	Name	Nat.	Pos.	From	Yrs	Seasons	Statistics									Ref.
Player	Name	Nat.	Pos.	From	Yrs	Seasons	GP	MP	PTS	REB	AST	MPG	PPG	RPG	APG	Ref.
Daniel Johnson	強森	(Australia)	C	Pepperdine	1	2023–2024	8	147:21	56	36	18	18:25	7.0	4.5	2.3	

=== K ===
Player	Name	Nat.	Pos.	From	Yrs	Seasons	Statistics									Ref.
Player	Name	Nat.	Pos.	From	Yrs	Seasons	GP	MP	PTS	REB	AST	MPG	PPG	RPG	APG	Ref.
Kao Shih-Chieh	高士杰	(Taiwan)	PF	NKNU	1	2022–2023	6	41:30	12	7	0	6:55	2.0	1.2	0.0	
Lasan Kromah	克羅馬	(Liberia) (United States)	SF	UConn	3	2023–2026	87	3304:18	2112	648	548	37:58	24.3	7.4	6.3	

=== L ===
Player	Name	Nat.	Pos.	From	Yrs	Seasons	Statistics									Ref.
Player	Name	Nat.	Pos.	From	Yrs	Seasons	GP	MP	PTS	REB	AST	MPG	PPG	RPG	APG	Ref.
Richard Laku	拿酷	(Sudan) (United States)	G	Cal State San Bernardino	1	2022–2023	3	46:33	16	14	2	15:31	5.3	4.7	0.7	
Adam Łapeta	拉佩塔	(Poland)	C	Poland	1	2022–2023	5	182:38	46	69	5	36:31	9.2	13.8	1.0	
Lee Chi-Wei	李啟瑋	(Taiwan)	SG	MDU	1	2023–2024	16	457:03	125	40	20	28:33	7.8	2.5	1.3	
Lin Sin-Kuan^{x}	林信寬	(Taiwan)	SF	NTNU	4	2023–present	91	2727:00	1004	307	172	29:58	11.0	3.4	1.9	
Lin Yi-Huei	林宜輝	(Taiwan)	F	NTNU	1	2022–2023	12	404:42	112	45	32	33:43	9.3	3.8	2.7	
Liu Yuan-Kai^{x}	劉元凱	(Taiwan)	C	FJU	5	2022–present	100	1028:16	171	180	39	10:16	1.7	1.8	0.4	
Lo Chen-Feng	羅振峰	(Taiwan)	SG	NKNU	2	2021–2023	35	851:32	265	97	31	24:19	7.6	2.8	0.9	
Lu Chieh-Min^{+}	盧捷閔	(Taiwan)	SG	FJU	3	2021–2024	64	1845:42	656	164	88	28:50	10.3	2.6	1.4	
Lu Tsai Yu-Lun	呂蔡瑜倫	(Taiwan)	F	Sendai	1	2022–2023	10	56:06	8	7	3	5:36	0.8	0.7	0.3	
Lu Zong-Lin	呂宗霖	(Taiwan)	PG	NTUST	1	2024–2025	5	48:16	3	7	7	9:39	0.6	1.4	1.4	

=== M ===
Player	Name	Nat.	Pos.	From	Yrs	Seasons	Statistics									Ref.
Player	Name	Nat.	Pos.	From	Yrs	Seasons	GP	MP	PTS	REB	AST	MPG	PPG	RPG	APG	Ref.
Chris McCullough	麥卡洛	(United States)	PF	Syracuse	1	2025–2026	24	682:27	381	255	37	28:26	15.9	10.6	1.5	
Malcolm Miller^{x}	米勒	(United States)	SF	Holy Cross	2	2025–present	30	964:40	476	267	62	32:09	15.9	8.9	2.1	
Aleksandar Mitrović	米特羅維奇	(Serbia)	PF	McGill	1	2021–2022	6	180:10	105	34	12	30:01	17.5	5.7	2.0	
Egidijus Mockevičius	艾吉	(Lithuania)	C	Evansville	1	2024–2025	20	579:51	235	275	19	28:59	11.8	13.8	1.0	
Brock Motum^{x}	莫騰	(Australia)	F	Washington State	1	2026–present	0	0:00	0	0	0	0:00	0.0	0.0	0.0	

=== O ===
Player	Name	Nat.	Pos.	From	Yrs	Seasons	Statistics									Ref.
Player	Name	Nat.	Pos.	From	Yrs	Seasons	GP	MP	PTS	REB	AST	MPG	PPG	RPG	APG	Ref.
Daniel Orton	歐頓	(United States)	C	Kentucky	1	2021–2022	5	163:00	44	74	18	32:36	8.8	14.8	3.6	

=== R ===
Player	Name	Nat.	Pos.	From	Yrs	Seasons	Statistics									Ref.
Player	Name	Nat.	Pos.	From	Yrs	Seasons	GP	MP	PTS	REB	AST	MPG	PPG	RPG	APG	Ref.
Earnest Ross	羅斯	(Guam) (United States)	SF	Missouri	1	2024–2025	5	119:26	51	30	13	23:53	10.2	6.0	2.6	

=== S ===
Player	Name	Nat.	Pos.	From	Yrs	Seasons	Statistics									Ref.
Player	Name	Nat.	Pos.	From	Yrs	Seasons	GP	MP	PTS	REB	AST	MPG	PPG	RPG	APG	Ref.
Larry Sanders	桑德斯	(United States)	C	VCU	1	2024–2025	1	20:20	6	6	1	20:20	6.0	6.0	1.0	
Mitchell Smith	史密斯	(United States)	F	Missouri	1	2024–2025	5	103:30	34	32	11	20:42	6.8	6.4	2.2	
Su Yi-Chieh	蘇翊傑	(Taiwan)	PG	NTNU	1	2022–2023	3	80:24	25	6	10	26:48	8.3	2.0	3.3	

=== T ===
Player	Name	Nat.	Pos.	From	Yrs	Seasons	Statistics									Ref.
Player	Name	Nat.	Pos.	From	Yrs	Seasons	GP	MP	PTS	REB	AST	MPG	PPG	RPG	APG	Ref.
Elijah Thomas	湯馬斯	(United States)	C	Clemson	1	2021–2022	9	239:36	193	75	16	26:37	21.4	8.3	1.8	
Ting Kuang-Hao	丁冠皓	(Taiwan)	SF	UCH	2	2024–2026	45	587:29	80	51	23	13:03	1.8	1.1	0.5	
Caelan Tiongson	狄安森	(Philippines) (United States)	SF	Biola	1	2021–2022	19	593:50	256	172	49	31:15	13.5	9.1	2.6	
Axel Toupane	圖霸	(France)	SF	France	1	2024–2025	8	209:35	104	50	26	26:11	13.0	6.3	3.3	
Tsai Yang-Ming	蔡揚名	(Taiwan)	PF	FJU	2	2021–2023	26	308:15	75	50	11	11:51	2.9	1.9	0.4	
Tsao Xun-Xiang^{x}	曹薰襄	(Taiwan) (Vietnam)	PG	NTUA	2	2025–present	36	706:02	181	81	134	19:36	5.0	2.3	3.7	
Tseng Pin-Fu	曾品富	(Taiwan)	SF	UCH	1	2022–2023	26	447:12	66	54	18	17:12	2.5	2.1	0.7	
Tung Yung-Chuan^{x}	董永全	(Taiwan)	SF	NTNU	3	2024–present	48	767:04	148	94	27	15:58	3.1	2.0	0.6	

=== U ===
Player	Name	Nat.	Pos.	From	Yrs	Seasons	Statistics									Ref.
Player	Name	Nat.	Pos.	From	Yrs	Seasons	GP	MP	PTS	REB	AST	MPG	PPG	RPG	APG	Ref.
Robert Upshaw	阿修羅	(United States)	C	Washington	1	2024–2025	6	122:14	60	23	1	20:22	10.0	3.8	0.2	

=== W ===
Player	Name	Nat.	Pos.	From	Yrs	Seasons	Statistics									Ref.
Player	Name	Nat.	Pos.	From	Yrs	Seasons	GP	MP	PTS	REB	AST	MPG	PPG	RPG	APG	Ref.
Wang Hao-Chi^{x}	王皓吉	(Taiwan)	F	HWU	2	2024–present	64	1270:29	305	132	41	19:51	4.8	2.1	0.6	
Wang Jhe-Yu^{x}	汪哲宇	(Taiwan)	SG	NTUST	3	2024–present	37	151:52	42	24	6	4:06	1.1	0.6	0.2	
DeAndre Williams	特威	(United States)	F	Memphis	1	2023–2024	9	172:03	102	56	21	19:07	11.3	6.2	2.3	
Devin Williams	威廉斯	(United States)	PF	West Virginia	2	2023–2025	57	1976:42	1054	829	79	34:40	18.5	14.5	1.4	
Troy Williams	威廉斯	(United States)	SF	Indiana	2	2021–2023	24	798:18	644	233	69	33:15	26.8	9.7	2.9	
Thomas Wimbush^{x}	溫布許	(United States)	SF	Fairmont State	1	2026–present	0	0:00	0	0	0	0:00	0.0	0.0	0.0	
Wu Chi-Ying	吳季穎	(Taiwan)	PG	FJU	1	2021–2022	21	314:49	86	32	20	14:59	4.1	1.5	1.0	
Wu Pei-Chia	吳沛嘉	(Taiwan)	C	SHU	1	2023–2024	1	1:30	0	1	0	1:30	0.0	1.0	0.0	

=== X ===
Player	Name	Nat.	Pos.	From	Yrs	Seasons	Statistics									Ref.
Player	Name	Nat.	Pos.	From	Yrs	Seasons	GP	MP	PTS	REB	AST	MPG	PPG	RPG	APG	Ref.
Xie Yu-Zheng	謝育政	(Taiwan)	PF	HWU	1	2021–2022	23	250:54	62	48	11	10:54	2.7	2.1	0.5	

=== Y ===
Player	Name	Nat.	Pos.	From	Yrs	Seasons	Statistics									Ref.
Player	Name	Nat.	Pos.	From	Yrs	Seasons	GP	MP	PTS	REB	AST	MPG	PPG	RPG	APG	Ref.
Yu Chu-Hsiang	尤楚翔	(Taiwan)	PF	SHU	1	2022–2023	2	3:19	0	0	0	1:39	0.0	0.0	0.0	
Yu Meng-Yun	余孟耘	(Taiwan)	PG	CCU	1	2021–2022	8	124:55	24	15	17	15:36	3.0	1.9	2.1	
