= List of 2021–22 T1 League transactions =

This is a list of transactions that took place during the 2021 T1 League off-season and the 2021–22 T1 League season.

== Front office movements ==
=== Head coaching changes ===
Off-season

Departure date	Team	Outgoing head coach	Reason for departure	Hire date	Incoming head coach	Last coaching position	Ref.
—N/a	New Taipei CTBC DEA	—N/a	—N/a	July 30	Lee Yi-Hua	Taipei Physical Education College / University of Taipei head coach (1998–2021)	
—N/a	Kaohsiung Aquas	—N/a	—N/a	August 7	Brendan Joyce	Australia women's national basketball team head coach (2013–2016)	
—N/a	Taoyuan Leopards	—N/a	—N/a	August 20	Wang Chih-Chun	National Taiwan Normal University head coach (2017–2021)	
—N/a	TaiwanBeer HeroBears	—N/a	—N/a	September 16	Yang Chih-Hao	Guangzhou Loong Lions junior team head coach (2018–2021)	
—N/a	Taichung Wagor Suns	—N/a	—N/a	September 29	Iurgi Caminos	Rizing Zephyr Fukuoka head coach (2019–2020)	
—N/a	Tainan TSG GhostHawks	—N/a	—N/a	October 3	Wu Chih-Wei	Hujiang High School head coach (2013–2021); Taiyuan Textile assistant coach (2013–2021)	

In-season

Departure date	Team	Outgoing head coach	Reason for departure	Hire date	Incoming head coach	Last coaching position	Ref.
April 1	Tainan TSG GhostHawks	Wu Chih-Wei	Assigned to team director	April 1	Liu Meng-Chu (interim)	Chien Hsin University of Science and Technology head coach (2013–present)	
April 10	Taoyuan Leopards	Wang Chih-Chun	Resigned	April 10	Su Yi-Chieh (interim)	—N/a	
May 16	Taoyuan Leopards	Su Yi-Chieh (interim)	Interim	May 16	Liu Chia-Fa	Jeoutai Technology / Kaohsiung Jeoutai Technology head coach (2019–2021)	

=== General manager assigns ===
Off-season

Departure date	Team	Outgoing general manager	Reason for departure	Hire date	Incoming general manager	Last managerial position	Ref.
—N/a	Kaohsiung Aquas	—N/a	—N/a	May 26	Wang De-Yao	—N/a	
—N/a	Taichung Wagor Suns	—N/a	—N/a	June 19	Wang Wei-Chieh	—N/a	
—N/a	New Taipei CTBC DEA	—N/a	—N/a	July 30	Chang Shu-Jen	—N/a	
—N/a	Tainan TSG GhostHawks	—N/a	—N/a	August 11	Chien Wei-Cheng	—N/a	
—N/a	Taoyuan Leopards	—N/a	—N/a	September 3	Su Yi-Chieh	—N/a	
—N/a	TaiwanBeer HeroBears	—N/a	—N/a	September 8	Ha Hsiao-Yuan	—N/a	

== Player movements ==
=== Trades ===
August
August 4	To Kaohsiung Aquas: Cash considerations (NTD 1.5M)	To New Taipei CTBC DEA: 2021 Aquas' first-round pick
March
March 16	To Taichung Wagor Suns: Chou Tzu-Hua	To TaiwanBeer HeroBears: 2022 Suns' second-round pick; 2023 Suns' second-round pick
March 19	To New Taipei CTBC DEA: Cash considerations	To Tainan TSG GhostHawks: Lu Chi-Erh

=== Free agents ===
Player	Date signed	New team	Former team	Ref.
Yu Chun-An	June 30	Kaohsiung Aquas	Kaohsiung Jeoutai Technology (Super Basketball League)	
Su Yi-Chin	July 2	Taichung Suns	Kaohsiung Jeoutai Technology (Super Basketball League)	
Chiu Po-Chang	July 6	Taichung Suns	Taoyuan Pauian Archiland (Super Basketball League)	
Lu Wei-Ting	July 7	Kaohsiung Aquas	ISU	
Chen Wen-Hung	July 15	Taichung Suns	Kaohsiung Jeoutai Technology (Super Basketball League)	
Yu Huan-Ya	July 17	Kaohsiung Aquas	Kaohsiung Jeoutai Technology (Super Basketball League)	
Ting Sheng-Ju	July 21	Taichung Suns	Taoyuan Pilots (P. League+)	
Wu Siao-Jin	July 27	Kaohsiung Aquas	Kaohsiung Jeoutai Technology (Super Basketball League)	
Lin Jen-Hung	July 27	Kaohsiung Aquas	Kaohsiung Jeoutai Technology (Super Basketball League)	
Li Han-Sheng	July 28	Kaohsiung Aquas	Kaohsiung Jeoutai Technology (Super Basketball League)	
Chen Huai-An	July 28	Kaohsiung Aquas	Kaohsiung Jeoutai Technology (Super Basketball League)	
Wu I-Ping	July 30	Kaohsiung Aquas	Kaohsiung Jeoutai Technology (Super Basketball League)	
Chin Ming-Ching	July 30	Kaohsiung Aquas	Kaohsiung Jeoutai Technology (Super Basketball League)	
Hu Long-Mao	August 1	Kaohsiung Aquas	Fujian Sturgeons (China)	
Lu Chi-Erh	August 5	New Taipei CTBC DEA	Yulon Luxgen Dinos (Super Basketball League)	
Liu Weir-Chern	August 6	New Taipei CTBC DEA	Bank of Taiwan (Super Basketball League)	
Sun Szu-Yao	August 14	Taichung Suns	Taoyuan Pilots (P. League+)	
Cheng Wei	August 27	Taoyuan Leopards	Hsinchu JKO Lioneers (P. League+)	
Lee Hsueh-Lin	August 29	New Taipei CTBC DEA	Formosa Dreamers (ASEAN Basketball League)	
Sani Sakakini	August 29	Taichung Suns	Beijing Royal Fighters (China)	
Xie Yu-Zheng	August 31	Taoyuan Leopards	HWU	
Chiang Yu-An	September 2	TaiwanBeer HeroBears	Taiwan Beer (Super Basketball League)	
Huang Tsung-Han	September 2	TaiwanBeer HeroBears	Taiwan Beer (Super Basketball League)	
Lee Chi-Wei	September 2	TaiwanBeer HeroBears	Taiwan Beer (Super Basketball League)	
Fan Shih-En	September 2	TaiwanBeer HeroBears	Taiwan Beer (Super Basketball League)	
Huang Jhen	September 2	TaiwanBeer HeroBears	Taiwan Beer (Super Basketball League)	
Chu I-Tsung	September 2	TaiwanBeer HeroBears	Taiwan Beer (Super Basketball League)	
Chou Po-Hsun	September 2	TaiwanBeer HeroBears	Taiwan Beer (Super Basketball League)	
Wang Hao-Chi	September 2	TaiwanBeer HeroBears	Taiwan Beer (Super Basketball League)	
Chou Tzu-hua	September 2	TaiwanBeer HeroBears	Formosa Dreamers (ASEAN Basketball League)	
Chen Ching-Huan	September 3	Taichung Suns	Taoyuan Pilots (P. League+)	
Maciej Lampe	September 9	TaiwanBeer HeroBears	Limoges CSP (France)	
Xavier Alexander	September 10	Kaohsiung Aquas	Singapore Slingers (Singapore)	
Kao Meng-Wei	September 14	Taichung Suns	NTCUST	
Ferrakohn Hall	September 17	Kaohsiung Aquas	Quimsa (Argentina)	
Li Ping-Hung	September 18	Taichung Suns	Kaohsiung Jeoutai Technology (Super Basketball League)	
Alonzo Gee	September 23	Taichung Suns	Bivouac (United States)	
Lin Ping-Sheng	September 24	New Taipei CTBC DEA	Shaanxi Wolves (China)	
Liu Ching	September 24	Taoyuan Leopards	FJU	
Tsai Yang-Ming	September 24	Taoyuan Leopards	Taoyuan Pauian Archiland (Super Basketball League)	
Jason Brickman (III)	September 24	Kaohsiung Aquas	San Miguel Alab Pilipinas (Philippines)	
Marlon Johnson	September 30	New Taipei CTBC DEA	Edmonton Stingers (Canada)	
Tony Mitchell	October 1	TaiwanBeer HeroBears	AS Salé (Morocco)	
Mindaugas Kupšas	October 1	Kaohsiung Aquas	BC Juventus (Lithuania)	
Du Yu-Cheng	October 4	Taoyuan Leopards	Taoyuan Pauian Archiland (Super Basketball League)	
Lu Chieh-Min	October 4	Taoyuan Leopards	Yulon Luxgen Dinos (Super Basketball League)	
Chanatip Jakrawan (III)	October 6	New Taipei CTBC DEA	Hi-Tech Bangkok City (Thailand)	
Donté Greene	October 7	Taichung Suns	Killer 3's (United States)	
Chang Wei-Hsiang	October 8	Tainan TSG GhostHawks	Yulon Luxgen Dinos (Super Basketball League)	
Chiang Chiao-An	October 8	Tainan TSG GhostHawks	UCH	
Chang Chia-Jung	October 8	Tainan TSG GhostHawks	Kaohsiung Jeoutai Technology (Super Basketball League)	
Lung Hung-Yuan	October 8	Tainan TSG GhostHawks	Bank of Taiwan (Super Basketball League)	
Huang Tsung-Han	October 8	Tainan TSG GhostHawks	NTNU	
Tseng Pin-Fu	October 8	Tainan TSG GhostHawks	UCH	
Kao Kuo-Chiang	October 8	Tainan TSG GhostHawks	Lioneers Jr. Team head coach (P. League+)	
Prince Ibeh	October 14	New Taipei CTBC DEA	Club Atlético Aguada (Uruguay)	
Caelan Tiongson (III)	October 15	Taoyuan Leopards	San Miguel Alab Pilipinas (Philippines)	
Jordan Heading (III)	October 20	Taichung Suns	San Miguel Alab Pilipinas (Philippines)	
Chien Chao-Yi	October 21	TaiwanBeer HeroBears	Fubon Braves (Super Basketball League)	
Wu Chi-Ying	October 22	Taoyuan Leopards	FJU	
Liu Hung-Po	October 22	Taoyuan Leopards	NKNU	
Yu Meng-Yun	October 22	Taoyuan Leopards	CCU	
Charles García	October 22	Tainan TSG GhostHawks	Taipei Fubon Braves (P. League+)	
Aleksandar Mitrović	October 27	Taoyuan Leopards	Al-Muharraq SC (Bahrain)	
Hasheem Thabeet	October 28	Tainan TSG GhostHawks	Hsinchu JKO Lioneers (P. League+)	
Jonah Morrison	November 2	New Taipei CTBC DEA	Formosa Taishin Dreamers (P. League+)	
Daniel Orton	November 4	Taoyuan Leopards	Aomori Wat's (Japan)	
Cleanthony Early	November 9	New Taipei CTBC DEA	Antibes Sharks (France)	
Diamond Stone	November 9	TaiwanBeer HeroBears	Gigantes de Carolina (Puerto Rico)	
Tsai Yao-Hsun	November 11	Tainan TSG GhostHawks	HZSH basketball team head coach	
Oscar Lin	November 15	Tainan TSG GhostHawks	Taipei Fubon Braves (P. League+)	
Liu Jen-Hao	November 17	Tainan TSG GhostHawks	Foshan Gongfuxiaozi (China)	
Deyonta Davis	November 19	Taoyuan Leopards	Santa Cruz Warriors (United States)	
Troy Williams	November 22	Taoyuan Leopards	Carpegna Prosciutto Basket Pesaro (Italy)	
Jordan Chatman	November 29	Tainan TSG GhostHawks	Taoyuan Pilots (P. League+)	
Negus Webster-Chan	November 30	Tainan TSG GhostHawks	Ottawa Blackjacks (Canada)	
Marcus Gilbert	December 1	Tainan TSG GhostHawks	APOEL B.C. (Cyprus)	
Julian Wright	December 21	Taichung Wagor Suns	Bivouac (United States)	
William Artino (III)	December 24	Tainan TSG GhostHawks	Hebraica Macabi (Uruguay)	
John Gillon	January 7	Taoyuan Leopards	Taoyuan Pilots (P. League+)	
Ramon Galloway	January 27	TaiwanBeer HeroBears	Taiwan Beer (Super Basketball League)	
Chang Chih-Feng	February 8	Taoyuan Leopards	CYCU basketball team coach	
Anthony Tucker	February 9	Taichung Wagor Suns	Kaohsiung Steelers (P. League+)	
Doral Moore	February 10	TaiwanBeer HeroBears	Taiwan Beer (Super Basketball League)	
Aaron Epps	February 12	New Taipei CTBC DEA	Agribertocchi Orzinuovi (Italy)	
Elijah Thomas	February 18	Taoyuan Leopards	Windy City Bulls (United States)	
Tyler Lamb (III)	February 23	TaiwanBeer HeroBears	Mono Vampire (Thailand)	
King Revolution	March 4	Tainan TSG GhostHawks	Kaohsiung Jeoutai Technology (Super Basketball League)	
Ronald Delph	March 9	TaiwanBeer HeroBears	Glasgow Rocks (Scotland)	
Avery Scharer (III)	March 17	New Taipei CTBC DEA	Dunkin' Raptors (Thailand)	
Aaron Geramipoor	March 18	Taichung Wagor Suns	C.D. Universidad de Concepción (Chile)	
Kevin Allen	March 18	New Taipei CTBC DEA	CSM Târgu Jiu (Romania)	
Negus Webster-Chan	March 18	Kaohsiung Aquas	Tainan TSG GhostHawks (Waived on March 17)	
Lin Wei-Han	March 18	New Taipei CTBC DEA	Qingdao Eagles (China)	
Niño Canaleta (III)	March 19	Taichung Wagor Suns	Blackwater Bossing (Philippines)	
Lester Prosper	March 20	Tainan TSG GhostHawks	Halcones de Xalapa (Mexico)	
Samuel Deguara	March 21	TaiwanBeer HeroBears	Taipei Fubon Braves (P. League+)	

=== Going overseas ===
Player	Date signed	New team	New country	Former T1 League team	Ref.
Prince Ibeh	March 15	Club Trouville	Uruguay	New Taipei CTBC DEA	
Liu Jen-Hao	March 30	Foshan Gongfuxiaozi	China	Tainan TSG GhostHawks	
Doral Moore	April 12	Ostioneros de Guaymas	Mexico	TaiwanBeer HeroBears (Waived on March 21)	
Cleanthony Early	May 4	Cape Town Tigers	South Africa	New Taipei CTBC DEA (Waived on April 11)	
King Revolution	May 9	Caribbean Storm Islands	Colombia	Tainan TSG GhostHawks (Waived on March 22)	
Donté Greene	May 31	Killer 3's	United States	Taichung Wagor Suns	

=== Waived ===
Player	Date waived	Former team	Ref.
Liu Ching	December 10	Taoyuan Leopards	
Daniel Orton	December 28	Taoyuan Leopards	
Maciej Lampe	February 4	TaiwanBeer HeroBears	
Tony Mitchell	February 4	TaiwanBeer HeroBears	
Negus Webster-Chan (III)	March 17	Tainan TSG GhostHawks	
Doral Moore	March 21	TaiwanBeer HeroBears	
King Revolution	March 22	Tainan TSG GhostHawks	
Aleksandar Mitrović	April 1	Taoyuan Leopards	
Chanatip Jakrawan (III)	April 10	New Taipei CTBC DEA	
Cleanthony Early	April 11	New Taipei CTBC DEA	
Ramon Galloway	April 22	TaiwanBeer HeroBears	

(III): Type-III players

== Draft ==
The 2021 T1 League draft was held on August 9, 2021. There were 58 players participated in the draft, and 17 players were chosen in 5 rounds.

Round	Player	Date signed	Team	Ref.
1	Mohammad Al Bachir Gadiaga	August 26	New Taipei CTBC DEA (rights acquired from Aquas)	
1	Hsieh Ya-Hsuan	August 24	New Taipei CTBC DEA (rights acquired from Aquas)	
1	Lo Chen-Feng	October 1	Taoyuan Leopards	
1	Yu Chu-Hsiang	August 28	Taichung Suns	
1	Lan Shao-Fu	—N/a	Tainan	
2	Wei Chia-Hao	August 11	New Taipei CTBC DEA	
2	Huang Yi-Sheng	October 4	Taoyuan Leopards	
2	Yang Cheng-Han	August 25	Taichung Suns	
2	Su Chih-Cheng	—N/a	Tainan	
2	Su Wen-Ju	August 19	Kaohsiung Aquas	
3	Tung Fang Yi-Kang	August 13	New Taipei CTBC DEA	
3	Chang Shun-Cheng	September 24	Taoyuan Leopards	
3	Lin Tzu-Feng	October 8	Tainan	
4	Liu Min-Yan	August 16	New Taipei CTBC DEA	
4	Liu Chun-Ting	October 8	Tainan	
5	Zhou Cheng-Rui	August 18	New Taipei CTBC DEA	
5	Wu Nien-Che	October 8	Tainan	

== See also ==
- 2021–22 Kaohsiung Aquas season
- 2021–22 New Taipei CTBC DEA season
- 2021–22 Taichung Wagor Suns season
- 2021–22 Tainan TSG GhostHawks season
- 2021–22 TaiwanBeer HeroBears season
- 2021–22 Taoyuan Leopards season
