= List of 2022–23 T1 League transactions =

This is a list of transactions that took place during the 2022 T1 League off-season and the 2022–23 T1 League season.

== Retirement ==
Date	Name	Team(s) played (years)	Age	Notes	Ref.
July 18	Tsai Yao-Hsun	Tainan TSG GhostHawks (2021–2022)	38	Also played in the SBL. Hired as coach by the Hou-Zong Senior High School basketball team.	
August 9	Kao Kuo-Chiang	Tainan TSG GhostHawks (2021–2022)	25	Also played overseas. Hired as coach by the Lioneers Jr. Team.	
August 15	Li Ping-Hung	Taichung Wagor Suns (2021–2022)	32	Also played in the SBL and the ABL. Hired as head coach by the National Taiwan Normal University basketball team.	
August 17	Chang Chih-Feng	Taoyuan Leopards (2022)	41	Also played in the CBA and the SBL. Hired as head coach by the Chung Yuan Christian University basketball team.	
December 20	Niño Canaleta	Taichung Wagor Suns / Taichung Suns (2022–2023)	40	Also played overseas. Hired as assistant coach by the Taichung Suns.	
December 25	Anthony Tucker	Taichung Wagor Suns (2022)	33	T1 League Sixth Man of the Year (2022); Also played in the ABL, PLG, and overseas. Hired as head coach by the Taichung Suns.	
—N/a	Oscar Lin	Tainan TSG GhostHawks (2021–2022)	27	Also played in the ABL and the PLG. Hired as personal skills coach and team interpreter by the Kaohsiung 17LIVE Steelers.	
—N/a	Chiang Chiao-An	Tainan TSG GhostHawks (2021–2022)	27	Hired as assistant coach by the Peiying Junior High School basketball team.	

== Front office movements ==
=== Head coaching changes ===
Off-season

Departure date	Team	Outgoing head coach	Reason for departure	Hire date	Incoming head coach	Last coaching position	Ref.
July 1	Taichung Suns	Iurgi Caminos	Hired as Taoyuan Pilots head coach	September 18	Alberto Garcia	Taichung Wagor Suns assistant coach (2021–2022)	
July 6	Tainan TSG GhostHawks	Liu Meng-Chu (interim)	Interim	July 6	Liu Meng-Chu	Chien Hsin University of Science and Technology head coach (2013–present); Tainan TSG GhostHawks interim head coach (2022)	
October 25	Taichung Suns	Alberto Garcia	—N/a	October 25	Chris Gavina	Rain or Shine Elasto Painters head coach (2021–2022)	

In-season

Departure date	Team	Outgoing head coach	Reason for departure	Hire date	Incoming head coach	Last coaching position	Ref.
March 3	Tainan TSG GhostHawks	Liu Meng-Chu	Coached Chien Hsin University of Science and Technology	March 3	Ma I-Hung (interim)	Tainan TSG GhostHawks assistant coach (2021–2023)	
March 5	Tainan TSG GhostHawks	Ma I-Hung (interim)	Interim	March 5	Liu Meng-Chu	Chien Hsin University of Science and Technology head coach (2013–present); Tainan TSG GhostHawks head coach (2022–2023)	
March 24	Tainan TSG GhostHawks	Liu Meng-Chu	Coached Chien Hsin University of Science and Technology	March 24	Ma I-Hung (interim)	Tainan TSG GhostHawks assistant coach (2021–2023)	
March 24	Taoyuan Leopards	Liu Chia-Fa	Assigned to player development and skills consultant	March 24	John Bennett	Raptors 905 assistant coach (2020–2022)	
March 26	Tainan TSG GhostHawks	Ma I-Hung (interim)	Interim	March 26	Liu Meng-Chu	Chien Hsin University of Science and Technology head coach (2013–present); Tainan TSG GhostHawks head coach (2022–2023)	

=== General manager changes ===
Off-season

Departure date	Team	Outgoing general manager	Reason for departure	Hire date	Incoming general manager	Last managerial position	Ref.
September 5	New Taipei CTBC DEA	Chang Shu-Jen	Hired as T1 League secretary general	September 5	Liu Chih-Wei	CTBC Brothers general manager (2017–2026)	

In-season

Departure date	Team	Outgoing general manager	Reason for departure	Hire date	Incoming general manager	Last managerial position	Ref.
December 19	Taoyuan Leopards	Su Yi-Chieh	Resigned	December 21	Chang Chien-Wei (interim)	—N/a	

=== Team president changes ===
Off-season

Departure date	Team	Outgoing member	Reason for departure	Hire date	Incoming member	Last managerial position	Ref.
—N/a	Tainan TSG GhostHawks	Sun Cheng-Chiang	Replaced	—N/a	Wang Chiung-Fen	TSG Hawks president (2022–present)	

== Player movements ==
=== Trades ===
June
June 20	To Taichung Wagor Suns: Cash considerations	To Taoyuan Leopards: Yu Chu-Hsiang
July
July 11	To Kaohsiung Aquas: 2022 DEA's first-round pick	To New Taipei CTBC DEA: Cash considerations (NTD 1.5M)

=== Free agents ===
Player	Date signed	New team	Former team	Ref.
Liu Yuan-Kai	June 14	Taoyuan Leopards	Taipei Dacin Tigers (Super Basketball League)	
Troy Williams	June 27	Taoyuan Leopards		
Deyonta Davis	June 30	Taoyuan Leopards		
Li Han-Sheng	July 4	Tainan TSG GhostHawks	Kaohsiung Aquas	
Lu Kuan-Ting	July 7	Tainan TSG GhostHawks	Kaohsiung Jeoutai Technology (Super Basketball League)	
Hu Kai-Hsiang	July 8	Tainan TSG GhostHawks	Yulon Luxgen Dinos (Super Basketball League)	
Lu Kuan-Hsuan	July 8	Taichung Wagor Suns	Yulon Luxgen Dinos (Super Basketball League)	
Mindaugas Kupšas	July 20	Kaohsiung Aquas		
Jason Brickman (III)	July 21	Kaohsiung Aquas		
Wu Tai-Hao	July 22	Tainan TSG GhostHawks	Hsinchu JKO Lioneers (P. League+)	
Yu Huan-Ya	July 22	Kaohsiung Aquas		
Lin Jen-Hung	July 26	Kaohsiung Aquas		
Samuel Deguara	August 9	Tainan TSG GhostHawks	TaiwanBeer HeroBears	
Lo Chen-Feng	August 10	Taoyuan Leopards		
Lu Chieh-Min	August 10	Taoyuan Leopards		
Cheng Wei	August 10	Taoyuan Leopards		
Taylor Braun	August 11	Tainan TSG GhostHawks	Kaohsiung Steelers (P. League+)	
Wu Hung-Hsing	August 16	Tainan TSG GhostHawks	Kaohsiung Jeoutai Technology (Super Basketball League)	
Tseng Pin-Fu	August 18	Taoyuan Leopards	Tainan TSG GhostHawks	
Wen Li-Huang	August 19	Taichung Wagor Suns	Taoyuan Pilots (P. League+)	
Stephan Hicks	August 26	TaiwanBeer HeroBears	Formosa Taishin Dreamers (P. League+)	
Kao Shih-Chieh	August 26	Taoyuan Leopards	NTUS basketball team coach	
Wang Yung-Cheng	August 30	Kaohsiung Aquas	Kaohsiung Jeoutai Technology (Super Basketball League)	
Chien Wei-Ju	September 1	Tainan TSG GhostHawks	Taipei Fubon Braves (P. League+)	
Matt Hodgson	September 2	TaiwanBeer HeroBears	Perth Wildcats (Australia)	
Aaron Geramipoor	September 9	Taichung Wagor Suns		
Milenko Veljković	September 12	TaiwanBeer HeroBears	HKK Zrinjski Mostar (Bosnia and Herzegovina)	
Edgaras Želionis	September 13	New Taipei CTBC DEA	Neptūnas Klaipėda (Lithuania)	
Adam Łapeta	September 14	Taoyuan Leopards	Alytus Dzūkija (Lithuania)	
Jure Gunjina	September 16	New Taipei CTBC DEA	KK Zabok (Croatia)	
Kristijan Krajina	September 22	New Taipei CTBC DEA	GTK Gliwice (Poland)	
D'Montre Edwards	September 28	Tainan TSG GhostHawks	Nanjing Tongxi Monkey Kings (China)	
Tony Bishop	September 30	Taichung Suns	Meralco Bolts (Philippines)	
Tseng Wen-Ting	September 30	New Taipei CTBC DEA	Taipei Fubon Braves (P. League+)	
Mike Edwards	October 3	Taichung Suns	KB Trepça (Kosovo)	
Liu Jen-Hao	October 4	New Taipei CTBC DEA	Foshan Gongfuxiaozi (China)	
John Bohannon	October 5	Kaohsiung Aquas	Manawatu Jets (New Zealand)	
Sedrick Barefield (III)	October 11	Tainan TSG GhostHawks	Taipei Fubon Braves (P. League+)	
Tsai Chien-Yu	October 12	Tainan TSG GhostHawks	Kaohsiung Jeoutai Technology (Super Basketball League)	
Austin Derrick (III)	October 25	Taichung Suns	Kaohsiung Steelers (P. League+)	
Diamond Stone	October 25	Taichung Suns	San Miguel Beermen (Philippines)	
Su Yi-Chieh	October 28	Taoyuan Leopards	Taoyuan Leopards (General manager)	
Delgerchuluun Bayasgalan (SFS)	October 31	Taichung Suns	HDUT	
Branden Dawson	November 2	TaiwanBeer HeroBears	Hsinchu JKO Lioneers (P. League+)	
Dwight Howard	November 8	Taoyuan Leopards	Los Angeles Lakers (United States)	
Robert Upshaw	November 10	Tainan TSG GhostHawks	BC Tsmoki-Minsk (Belarus)	
Cleanthony Early	November 25	TaiwanBeer HeroBears	Gladiadores de Anzoátegui (Venezuela)	
Michael Efevberha	November 25	Taoyuan Leopards	Béliers de Kemper (France)	
Peng Chun-Yen	December 1	Taichung Suns	Kaohsiung 17LIVE Steelers (P. League+)	
Prince Ibeh	December 14	TaiwanBeer HeroBears	NorthPort Batang Pier (Philippines)	
Demitrius Conger	December 15	New Taipei CTBC DEA	B.C. Oostende (Belgium)	
Shaheed Davis	December 15	Tainan TSG GhostHawks	Lavrio Megabolt (Greece)	
Lin Yi-Huei	December 15	Taoyuan Leopards	Hsinchu JKO Lioneers (P. League+)	
Sim Bhullar	December 16	Tainan TSG GhostHawks	Hsinchu JKO Lioneers (P. League+)	
Niño Canaleta	December 23	Taichung Suns	Taichung Suns (Assistant coach)	
Marlon Johnson	December 24	Taichung Suns	Edmonton Stingers (Canada)	
Perry Jones	January 6	TaiwanBeer HeroBears	Taipei Fubon Braves (P. League+)	
Nick Faust	January 12	Tainan TSG GhostHawks	Formosa Taishin Dreamers (P. League+)	
Elijah Thomas	January 18	Kaohsiung Aquas	Earthfriends Tokyo Z (Japan)	
Lin Ming-Yi	January 29	Taichung Suns	Hsinchu JKO Lioneers (P. League+)	
Derek King	January 30	Taichung Suns	Formosa Taishin Dreamers (P. League+)	
Nick King	January 30	New Taipei CTBC DEA	Windy City Bulls (United States)	
Chen Ching-Huan	January 31	Tainan TSG GhostHawks	Taichung Suns (Waived on January 24)	
Liang Hao-Zhen	February 1	TaiwanBeer HeroBears	Taiwan Beer (Super Basketball League)	
Lu Tsai Yu-Lun	February 2	Taoyuan Leopards	TaiwanBeer HeroBears (Out on loan)	
Jordan Tolbert	February 3	Taichung Suns	Taiwan Beer (Super Basketball League)	
Yang Tian-You	February 10	TaiwanBeer HeroBears	Taiwan Beer (Super Basketball League)	
Rayvonte Rice	February 10	Taichung Suns	Brampton Honey Badgers (Canada)	
Kaspars Bērziņš	February 21	New Taipei CTBC DEA	SIG Strasbourg (France)	
Wu Yen-Lun	February 23	Tainan TSG GhostHawks	Suke Lion (China)	
Raphiael Putney	February 24	Taichung Suns	Cape Town Tigers (South Africa)	
Michael Qualls	March 3	TaiwanBeer HeroBears	Rain or Shine Elasto Painters (Philippines)	
Richard Laku	March 5	Taoyuan Leopards	Keila KK (Estonia)	
Marcus Weathers	March 6	Tainan TSG GhostHawks	NorthPort Batang Pier (Philippines)	
Arnett Moultrie	March 9	Taichung Suns	Xinjiang Flying Tigers (China)	
Keith Benson	March 9	Taichung Suns	Juventus Utena (Lithuania)	
Hasheem Thabeet	March 13	TaiwanBeer HeroBears	Sichuan Blue Whales (China)	
Xavier Alexander	March 17	Kaohsiung Aquas	Singapore Slingers (Singapore)	
Chang Chia-Jung			Tainan TSG GhostHawks	
Ferrakohn Hall			Kaohsiung Aquas	
Jordan Chatman			Tainan TSG GhostHawks	
Alonzo Gee			Taichung Suns	
Yu Meng-Yun			Taoyuan Leopards	
D'Montre Edwards			Tainan TSG GhostHawks (Waived on November 7)	

=== Going to other Taiwanese leagues ===
Player	Date signed	New team	New league	Former T1 League team	Ref.
Sani Sakakini	July 22	Taoyuan Pilots	P. League+	Taichung Wagor Suns	
William Artino (III)	August 5	Hsinchu JKO Lioneers	P. League+	Tainan TSG GhostHawks	
Xie Yu-Zheng	August 5	Changhua Jr.	3X3.EXE	Taoyuan Leopards (Waived on July 20)	
Wu Chi-Ying	August 18	Yulon Luxgen Dinos	Super Basketball League	Taoyuan Leopards (Waived on July 20)	
Huang Tsung-Han	August 18	Yulon Luxgen Dinos	Super Basketball League	Tainan TSG GhostHawks	
Chiu Po-Chang	September 2	Kaohsiung Steelers	P. League+	Taichung Wagor Suns (Waived on August 31)	
Chou Tzu-Hua	October 17	Kaohsiung Formosa Plastics	Absolute 3X3 Basketball	Taichung Wagor Suns	
Wang Hao-Chi	October 17	Taiwan Beer	Super Basketball League	TaiwanBeer HeroBears	
Wu Nien-Che	November 28	Taiwan Beer	Super Basketball League	Tainan TSG GhostHawks	
Chien Chao-Yi	November 28	Taiwan Beer	Super Basketball League	TaiwanBeer HeroBears	
Sun Szu-Yao	December 7	Kaohsiung 17LIVE Steelers	P. League+	Taichung Wagor Suns (Waived on November 30)	

=== Going overseas ===
Player	Date signed	New team	New country	Former T1 League team	Ref.
Marlon Johnson	March 23	Edmonton Stingers	Canada	New Taipei CTBC DEA (Left DEA after the end of 2021–22 season)	
Julian Wright	May 29	3's Company	United States	Taichung Wagor Suns	
Chanatip Jakrawan (III)	May 31	Hitech Titans	Thailand	New Taipei CTBC DEA (Waived on April 10, 2022)	
Ramon Galloway	June 14	Metros de Santiago	Dominican Republic	TaiwanBeer HeroBears (Waived on April 22, 2022)	
Tony Mitchell	July 20	Soles de Santo Domingo Este	Dominican Republic	TaiwanBeer HeroBears (Waived on February 4, 2022)	
Elijah Thomas	June 24	Titanes del Distrito Nacional	Dominican Republic	Taoyuan Leopards	
Avery Scharer (III)	June 26	Khon Kaen Raptors	Thailand	New Taipei CTBC DEA	
Jordan Heading (III)	July 1	Nagasaki Velca	Japan	Taichung Wagor Suns	
Xavier Alexander	July 2	Halcones de Xalapa	Mexico	Kaohsiung Aquas	
Ronald Delph	July 7	Marinos B.B.C.	Venezuela	TaiwanBeer HeroBears	
Diamond Stone	July 8	Cocodrilos de Caracas	Venezuela	TaiwanBeer HeroBears	
Kevin Allen	August 5	Real Valladolid Baloncesto	Spain	New Taipei CTBC DEA	
Aleksandar Mitrović	August 14	Al-Qurain SC	Kuwait	Taoyuan Leopards (Waived on April 1, 2022)	
Lester Prosper	August 16	Terrafirma Dyip	Philippines	Tainan TSG GhostHawks	
Marcus Gilbert	August 27	Héroes de Falcón	Venezuela	Tainan TSG GhostHawks	
Hasheem Thabeet	October 5	Sichuan Blue Whales	China	Tainan TSG GhostHawks	
Charles García	October 7	Los Prados de Santo Domingo	Dominican Republic	Tainan TSG GhostHawks	
Anthony Tucker	October 24	Windy City Bulls	United States	Taichung Wagor Suns	
Caelan Tiongson (III)	November 4	Barangay Ginebra San Miguel	Philippines	Taoyuan Leopards	
Niño Canaleta (III)	November 19	Boracay Islanders	Philippines	Taichung Wagor Suns	
Aaron Epps	December 14	Raptors 905	Canada	New Taipei CTBC DEA	
Diamond Stone	December 23	Zavkhan Brothers	Mongolia	Taichung Suns (Waived on December 23)	
Jure Gunjina	December 30	KK Gorica	Croatia	New Taipei CTBC DEA (Waived on December 16)	
Mike Edwards	January 16	London Lightning	Canada	Taichung Suns (Waived on November 11)	
Cleanthony Early	January 21	Dynamo Lebanon	Lebanon	TaiwanBeer HeroBears (Waived on January 5)	
Shaheed Davis	January 24	Maccabi Haifa	Israel	Tainan TSG GhostHawks (Waived on January 13)	
Tony Bishop	January 28	Real Estelí	Nicaragua	Taichung Suns (Waived on January 13)	
Troy Williams	February 2	Blackwater Bossing	Philippines	Taoyuan Leopards (Waived on February 2)	
Sedrick Barefield (III)	February 7	Bay Area Dragons	Hong Kong	Tainan TSG GhostHawks (Waived on December 5)	
Demitrius Conger	February 27	Rapid București	Romania	New Taipei CTBC DEA (Waived on February 21)	
Jordan Tolbert	February 27	Rain or Shine Elasto Painters	Philippines	Taichung Suns	
John Gillon	March 2	Pieno žvaigždės Pasvalys	Lithuania	Taoyuan Leopards	
Raphiael Putney	March 14	Club Atlético Aguada	Uruguay	Taichung Suns (Waived on March 9)	
Prince Ibeh	March 18	Guaros de Lara	Venezuela	TaiwanBeer HeroBears (Waived on March 6)	
Marlon Johnson	March 18	Dynamo Lebanon	Lebanon	Taichung Suns (Waived on March 9)	
Nick Faust	March 27	Spartans Distrito Capital	Venezuela	Tainan TSG GhostHawks (Waived on March 6)	
Elijah Thomas	April 5	Pioneros de Los Mochis	Mexico	Kaohsiung Aquas (Waived on March 7)	
Matt Hodgson	April 11	Ipswich Force	Australia	TaiwanBeer HeroBears (Waived on November 26)	
Branden Dawson	April 21	Spartans Distrito Capital	Venezuela	TaiwanBeer HeroBears (Waived on April 4)	
Negus Webster-Chan	May 10	Team AboutBillions	United States	Kaohsiung Aquas	

=== Waived ===
Player	Date waived	Former team	Ref.
Xie Yu-Zheng	July 20	Taoyuan Leopards	
Wu Chi-Ying	July 20	Taoyuan Leopards	
Chiu Po-Chang	August 31	Taichung Wagor Suns	
Stephan Hicks	October 28	TaiwanBeer HeroBears	
D'Montre Edwards	November 7	Tainan TSG GhostHawks	
Mike Edwards	November 11	Taichung Suns	
Matt Hodgson	November 26	TaiwanBeer HeroBears	
Sun Szu-Yao	November 30	Taichung Suns	
Sedrick Barefield (III)	December 5	Tainan TSG GhostHawks	
Milenko Veljković	December 13	TaiwanBeer HeroBears	
Jure Gunjina	December 16	New Taipei CTBC DEA	
Diamond Stone	December 23	Taichung Suns	
Taylor Braun	December 30	Tainan TSG GhostHawks	
Cleanthony Early	January 5	TaiwanBeer HeroBears	
Tony Bishop	January 13	Taichung Suns	
Shaheed Davis	January 13	Tainan TSG GhostHawks	
Chen Ching-Huan	January 24	Taichung Suns	
Troy Williams	February 2	Taoyuan Leopards	
Demitrius Conger	February 21	New Taipei CTBC DEA	
Adam Łapeta	March 5	Taoyuan Leopards	
Prince Ibeh	March 6	TaiwanBeer HeroBears	
Nick Faust	March 6	Tainan TSG GhostHawks	
Elijah Thomas	March 7	Kaohsiung Aquas	
Marlon Johnson	March 9	Taichung Suns	
Raphiael Putney	March 9	Taichung Suns	
Branden Dawson	April 4	TaiwanBeer HeroBears	

(III): Type-III players
(SFS): Special foreign student

== Draft ==
The 2022 T1 League draft was held on July 12, 2022, at Syntrend Creative Park in Taipei City. There were 44 players participated in the draft, and 14 players were chosen in 3 rounds.

Round	Player	Date signed	Team	Ref.
1	Chiu Tzu-Hsuan	July 31	Kaohsiung Aquas (rights acquired from DEA)	
1	Pai Yao-Cheng	—N/a	Kaohsiung Aquas (rights acquired from DEA)	
1	Tung Yung-Chuan	August 17	Taichung Wagor Suns	
1	Tsao Xun-Xiang	July 28	TaiwanBeer HeroBears	
1	Chen Hsiao-Jung	July 13	Taoyuan Leopards (5th place in the 2021–22 season)	
1	Chen Chien-Ming	July 19	Taoyuan Leopards (5th place in the 2021–22 season)	
1	Ku Mao Wei-Chia	August 1	Tainan TSG GhostHawks (6th place in the 2021–22 season)	
1	Han Chieh-Yu	August 1	Tainan TSG GhostHawks (6th place in the 2021–22 season)	
2	Chen Yu-An	August 23	New Taipei CTBC DEA	
2	Lu Tsai Yu-Lun	August 5	TaiwanBeer HeroBears (rights acquired from Suns)	
2	Huang Jian-Zhi	—N/a	TaiwanBeer HeroBears (rights acquired from Suns)	
2	Lin Tzu-Wei	—N/a	Taoyuan Leopards	
3	Lee Ming-Xiu	October 25	Taichung Wagor Suns	
3	Huang Hung-Yu	—N/a	TaiwanBeer HeroBears	

== See also ==
- 2022–23 Kaohsiung Aquas season
- 2022–23 New Taipei CTBC DEA season
- 2022–23 Taichung Suns season
- 2022–23 Tainan TSG GhostHawks season
- 2022–23 TaiwanBeer HeroBears season
- 2022–23 Taoyuan Leopards season
