= 2021–22 Taoyuan Leopards season =

Taiwanese professional basketball season

- President: Liu Chin-Liang
- General Manager: Su Yi-Chieh
- Head Coach: Wang Chih-Chun (resigned); Su Yi-Chieh (interim); Liu Chia-Fa
- Arena: Chung Yuan Christian University Gymnasium; Taipei Heping Basketball Gymnasium; Taoyuan Arena

T1 League results
- Record: 8–22 (26.7%)
- Place: 5th
- Playoffs finish: Play-in (lost to HeroBears, 0–2)

Player records
- Points: Troy Williams 25.8
- Rebounds: Deyonta Davis 14.2
- Assists: John Gillon 8.2

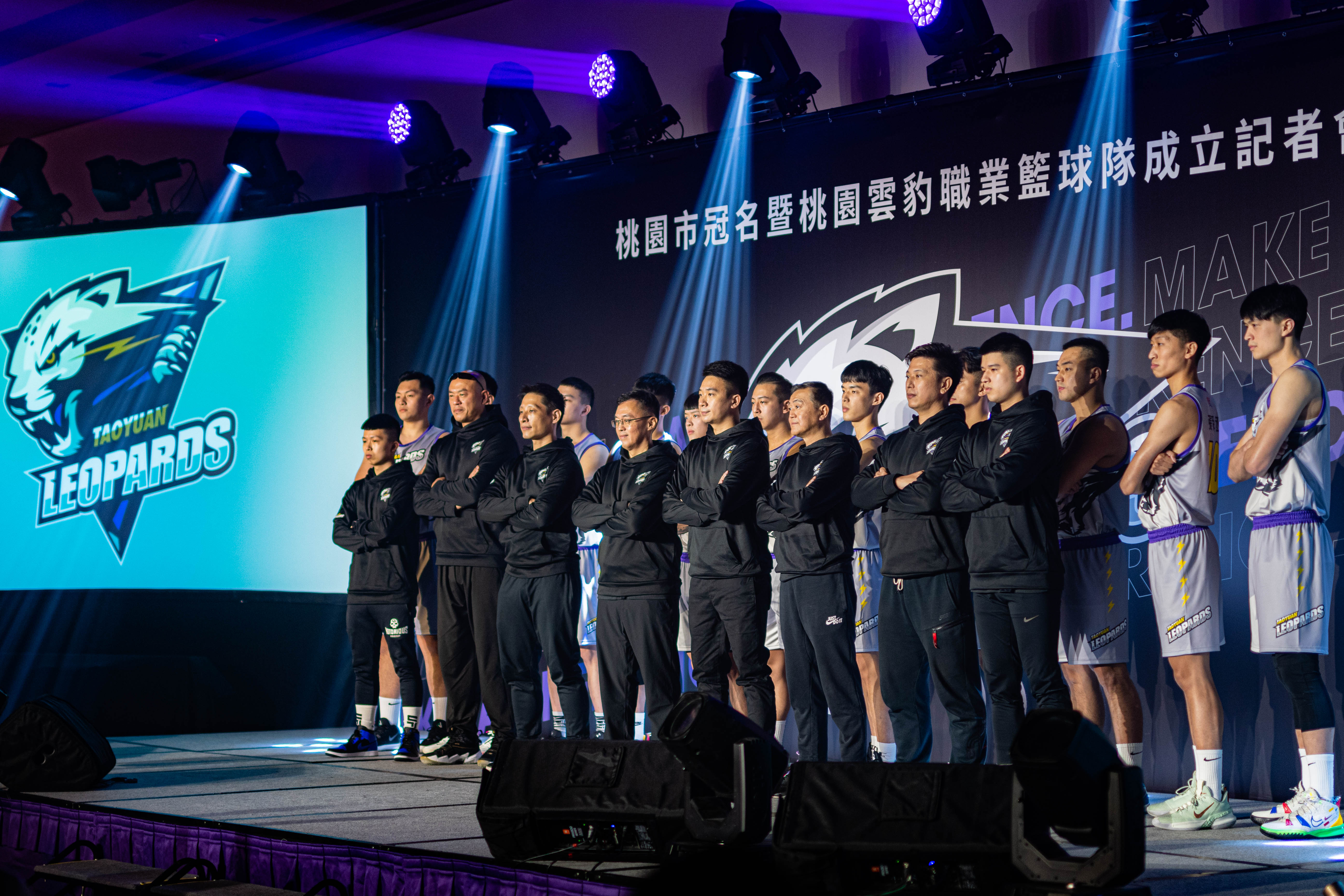
Taoyuan Leopards held the preseason press conference on November 10, 2021.

The 2021–22 Taoyuan Leopards season was the franchise's first season, its first season in the T1 League.

The Leopards were coached by Wang Chih-Chun in his first year as their head coach. On September 3, 2021, the Leopards hired Su Yi-Chieh as their general manager. On April 10, 2022, the Leopards announced that Wang Chih-Chun resigned from head coach, and named Su Yi-Chieh as their interim head coach. On May 16, the Leopards named Liu Chia-Fa, the skills consultant of the Taoyuan Leopards, as their new head coach.

== Draft ==
Round	Player	Position(s)	School / club team
1	Lo Chen-Feng	Small forward	NKNU
2	Huang Yi-Sheng	Shooting guard	SHU
3	Chang Shun-Cheng	Shooting guard / forward	UKN

- Reference：

== Roster ==
2021–22 Taoyuan Leopards roster
Players
Coaches

Pos.	No.	Nat.	Name	Ht.	Wt.	Age	From
SF	0	(Philippines) (United States)	Caelan Tiongson (AI)	1.97 m (6 ft 6 in)	92 kg (203 lb)	30 – 7 May 1992	Biola
PG	1	(Taiwan)	Cheng Wei (C)	1.80 m (5 ft 11 in)	90 kg (198 lb)	31 – 8 January 1991	USC
C	2	(United States)	Elijah Thomas (I)	2.06 m (6 ft 9 in)	111 kg (245 lb)	25 – 10 October 1996	Clemson
PG	3	(Taiwan)	Yu Meng-Yun	1.77 m (5 ft 10 in)	77 kg (170 lb)	26 – 8 May 1996	CCU
C	4	(United States)	Deyonta Davis (I)	2.11 m (6 ft 11 in)	108 kg (238 lb)	25 – 2 December 1996	Michigan State
SF	5	(United States)	Troy Williams (I)	2.01 m (6 ft 7 in)	95 kg (209 lb)	27 – 30 December 1994	Indiana
PF	6	(Taiwan)	Xie Yu-Zheng	1.95 m (6 ft 5 in)	115 kg (254 lb)	27 – 1 October 1994	HWU
SG	7	(Taiwan)	Lu Chieh-Min	1.83 m (6 ft 0 in)	92 kg (203 lb)	26 – 12 October 1995	FJU
PF	9	(Taiwan)	Tsai Yang-Ming	1.95 m (6 ft 5 in)	87 kg (192 lb)	27 – 18 January 1995	FJU
SG	10	(Taiwan)	Chang Shun-Cheng	1.88 m (6 ft 2 in)	70 kg (154 lb)	24 – 23 March 1998	UKN
SG	11	(Taiwan)	Lo Chen-Feng	1.95 m (6 ft 5 in)	90 kg (198 lb)	24 – 9 September 1997	NKNU
PF	12	(Taiwan)	Du Yu-Cheng	1.83 m (6 ft 0 in)	89 kg (196 lb)	26 – 8 June 1995	VNU
SG	13	(Taiwan)	Chang Chih-Feng	1.83 m (6 ft 0 in)	90 kg (198 lb)	41 – 22 April 1981	TPEC
PG	22	(United States)	John Gillon (I)	1.83 m (6 ft 0 in)	87 kg (192 lb)	28 – 31 March 1994	Syracuse
PG	25	(Taiwan)	Wu Chi-Ying	1.81 m (5 ft 11 in)	75 kg (165 lb)	24 – 25 March 1998	FJU
PF	57	(Taiwan)	Liu Hung-Po	1.93 m (6 ft 4 in)	85 kg (187 lb)	26 – 12 November 1995	NKNU
SG	92	(Taiwan)	Huang Yi-Sheng	1.85 m (6 ft 1 in)	88 kg (194 lb)	25 – 14 December 1996	SHU

Head coach

- (Taiwan) Liu Chia-Fa

Assistant coach(es)

- (Taiwan) Han Yi-Ping
- (Taiwan) Lin Yu-Shu

Strength & conditioning coach(es)

- (Taiwan) Kao Han-Yao

Athletic trainer(s)

- (Taiwan) Chou Yueh-Chang

Team manager

- (Taiwan) Su Yi-Chieh

Legend

- (C) Team captain
- (I) Import player
- (AI) Asian import player
- Injured

- Roster
Updated: May 16, 2022

== Preseason ==
=== Game log ===
2021 preseason game log
Total: 0–1 (home: 0–0; road: 0–1)
Preseason : 0–1 (home: 0–0; road: 0–1)

Game	Date	Team	Score	High points	High rebounds	High assists	Location Attendance	Record
1	November 13	@ GhostHawks	L 87–97	Wu Chi-Ying (25)	Tsai Yang-Ming (13)	Cheng Wei (6); Yu Meng-Yun (6)	Kaohsiung Arena; 3,288	0–1

Color： Win Lose
Schedule

== Regular season ==
=== Standings ===
Pos	Team	Pld	W	L	PCT	GB	Qualification
1	Kaohsiung Aquas	30	23	7	.767	—	Advance to semifinals
2	Taichung Wagor Suns	30	20	10	.667	3	Advance to semifinals
3	New Taipei CTBC DEA	30	17	13	.567	6	Advance to semifinals
4	TaiwanBeer HeroBears	30	16	14	.533	7	Advance to play-in
5	Taoyuan Leopards	30	8	22	.267	15	Advance to play-in
6	Tainan TSG GhostHawks	30	6	24	.200	17	

Source: T1 League

=== Game log ===
2021–22 regular season game log
Total: 8–22 (home: 6–9; road: 2–13)
December : 1–4 (home: 0–2; road: 1–2)

Game	Date	Team	Score	High points	High rebounds	High assists	Location Attendance	Record
1	December 11	@ DEA	L 77–85	Caelan Tiongson (19)	Daniel Orton (28)	Daniel Orton (5)	Xinzhuang Gymnasium	0–1
2	December 12	@ HeroBears	L 93–102	Aleksandar Mitrović (30)	Daniel Orton (10)	Yu Meng-Yun (7)	University of Taipei Tianmu Campus Gymnasium	0–2
3	December 18	@ GhostHawks	W 89–81	Aleksandar Mitrović (21)	Daniel Orton (21)	Daniel Orton (6)	Chia Nan University of Pharmacy and Science Shao Tsung Gymnasium	1–2
4	December 25	DEA	L 72–85	Aleksandar Mitrović (25)	Caelan Tiongson (16)	Daniel Orton (5)	Chung Yuan Christian University Gymnasium; 2,086	1–3
5	December 26	GhostHawks	L 83–114	Caelan Tiongson (26)	Caelan Tiongson (11)	Caelan Tiongson (3); Du Yu-Cheng (3); Aleksandar Mitrović (3)	Chung Yuan Christian University Gymnasium	1–4

January : 0–5 (home: 0–2; road: 0–3)

Game	Date	Team	Score	High points	High rebounds	High assists	Location Attendance	Record
6	January 1	@ GhostHawks	L 113–132	Troy Williams (38)	Caelan Tiongson (17)	Cheng Wei (6)	Chia Nan University of Pharmacy and Science Shao Tsung Gymnasium	1–5
7	January 9	@ Suns	L 74–101	Caelan Tiongson (27)	Caelan Tiongson (17)	Cheng Wei (5)	National Taiwan University of Sport Gymnasium	1–6
8	January 15	Aquas	L 82–116	John Gillon (15); Du Yu-Cheng (15)	Tsai Yang-Ming (10); Deyonta Davis (10)	Caelan Tiongson (5)	Chung Yuan Christian University Gymnasium; No in-person attendance	1–7
9	January 16	Suns	L 115–119	Troy Williams (31)	Troy Williams (11)	John Gillon (11)	Chung Yuan Christian University Gymnasium; No in-person attendance	1–8
10	January 22	@ DEA	L 104–125	John Gillon (29)	Troy Williams (13)	John Gillon (4)	Xinzhuang Gymnasium	1–9
—	January 29	HeroBears	Postponed to April 30					

February : 1–2 (home: 0–0; road: 1–2)

Game	Date	Team	Score	High points	High rebounds	High assists	Location Attendance	Record
—	February 5	Aquas	Postponed to May 1					
—	February 6	Suns	Postponed to April 29					
11	February 13	@ Aquas	L 116–133	Caelan Tiongson (30)	Troy Williams (17)	John Gillon (5); Troy Williams (5)	Kaohsiung Arena	1–10
—	February 19	GhostHawks	Postponed to March 25					
—	February 20	Aquas	Postponed to March 11					
12	February 27	@ Suns	L 102–108	John Gillon (26)	Deyonta Davis (18)	John Gillon (6)	National Taiwan University of Sport Gymnasium	1–11
13	February 28	@ GhostHawks	W 118–99	John Gillon (34)	Deyonta Davis (20)	John Gillon (8)	Chia Nan University of Pharmacy and Science Shao Tsung Gymnasium	2–11

March : 3–4 (home: 3–1; road: 0–3)

Game	Date	Team	Score	High points	High rebounds	High assists	Location Attendance	Record
14	March 6	@ HeroBears	L 113–115	Troy Williams (25)	Deyonta Davis (19)	John Gillon (9)	University of Taipei Tianmu Campus Gymnasium	2–12
15	March 11	Aquas	L 100–106	Deyonta Davis (26)	Deyonta Davis (21)	John Gillon (7)	Chung Yuan Christian University Gymnasium	2–13
16	March 12	HeroBears	W 101–96	Caelan Tiongson (23)	Deyonta Davis (16)	John Gillon (6)	Chung Yuan Christian University Gymnasium	3–13
17	March 13	GhostHawks	W 97–84	Elijah Thomas (18)	Deyonta Davis (15)	John Gillon (10)	Chung Yuan Christian University Gymnasium	4–13
18	March 19	@ Aquas	L 84–111	Deyonta Davis (17)	Deyonta Davis (7)	John Gillon (8)	Kaohsiung Arena	4–14
19	March 25	GhostHawks	W 109–93	Deyonta Davis (29)	Deyonta Davis (17)	John Gillon (10)	Chung Yuan Christian University Gymnasium	5–14
20	March 27	@ Suns	L 93–98	Deyonta Davis (22); John Gillon (22)	Deyonta Davis (18)	John Gillon (5)	National Taiwan University of Sport Gymnasium	5–15

April : 1–5 (home: 1–2; road: 0–3)

Game	Date	Team	Score	High points	High rebounds	High assists	Location Attendance	Record
—	April 2	DEA	Postponed to May 7					
—	April 3	Suns	Postponed to May 8					
21	April 5	@ HeroBears	L 88–120	Elijah Thomas (35)	Deyonta Davis (12)	Elijah Thomas (5)	University of Taipei Tianmu Campus Gymnasium; No in-person attendance	5–16
22	April 9	@ DEA	L 121–139	John Gillon (39)	Deyonta Davis (12)	John Gillon (17)	Xinzhuang Gymnasium	5–17
23	April 17	@ Aquas	L 104–119	Troy Williams (35)	Troy Williams (10); Elijah Thomas (10)	Troy Williams (7)	Kaohsiung Arena	5–18
24	April 23	HeroBears	W 135–134	Troy Williams (30); John Gillon (30)	Elijah Thomas (11)	John Gillon (14)	Taipei Heping Basketball Gymnasium	6–18
25	April 24	DEA	L 119–132	Troy Williams (30)	Tsai Yang-Ming (9)	John Gillon (7)	Taipei Heping Basketball Gymnasium	6–19
26	April 29	Suns	L 97–112	Troy Williams (24)	Deyonta Davis (14)	John Gillon (7)	Chung Yuan Christian University Gymnasium	6–20
—	April 30	HeroBears	Postponed to May 6					

May : 2–2 (home: 2–2; road: 0–0)

Game	Date	Team	Score	High points	High rebounds	High assists	Location Attendance	Record
27	May 1	Aquas	L 117–137	Troy Williams (44)	Troy Williams (14)	John Gillon (7)	Chung Yuan Christian University Gymnasium	6–21
—	May 6	HeroBears	Postponed to May 19					
—	May 7	DEA	Postponed to May 18					
—	May 8	Suns	Postponed to May 20					
28	May 18	DEA	W 136–124	Troy Williams (50)	Deyonta Davis (18)	John Gillon (9)	Taoyuan Arena	7–21
29	May 19	HeroBears	W 110–104	Deyonta Davis (23); John Gillon (23)	Deyonta Davis (13)	John Gillon (14)	Taoyuan Arena	8–21
30	May 20	Suns	L 125–127 (OT)	Troy Williams (37)	Troy Williams (17)	John Gillon (9)	Taoyuan Arena	8–22

Color： Win Lose Postponed
Schedule

=== Regular season note ===
- Due to the COVID-19 pandemic in Taoyuan, the Taoyuan City Government and Taoyuan Leopards declared that the games at the Chung Yuan Christian University Gymnasium would play behind closed doors from January 15 to 16.
- Due to the COVID-19 pandemic in Taiwan, the T1 League declared that the games on January 29, February 5 and 6 would be postponed to April 30, May 1 and April 29.
- Due to the COVID-19 pandemic in Taiwan, the T1 League declared that the games on February 19 and 20 would be postponed to March 25 and 11.
- Due to the COVID-19 pandemic in Taiwan, the T1 League declared that the games on April 2 and 3 would be postponed to May 7 and 8.
- Due to the COVID-19 pandemic in Taiwan, the T1 League declared that the games at the University of Taipei Tianmu Campus Gymnasium would play behind closed doors from April 4 to 10.
- Due to a player of the TaiwanBeer HeroBears testing positive, the T1 League declared that the game on April 30 would be postponed to May 6.
- Because the Taoyuan Leopards could not reach the minimum player number, the T1 League declared that the games on May 6 to 8 would be postponed to May 19, 18 and 20.

== Playoffs ==
=== Game log ===
2022 playoffs game log
Total: 0–1 (home: 0–1; road: 0–0)
Play-in : 0–1 (home: 0–1; road: 0–0)

Game	Date	Team	Score	High points	High rebounds	High assists	Location Attendance	Series
1	May 22	HeroBears	L 110–128	Troy Williams (47)	Troy Williams (9)	Troy Williams (6)	Taoyuan Arena	0–2

Color： Win Lose
Schedule

=== Play-in note ===
- The fourth seed, TaiwanBeer HeroBears, was awarded a one-win advantage before the play-in series.

== Player statistics ==
Legend
GP	Games played	MPG	Minutes per game	2P%	2-point field goal percentage
3P%	3-point field goal percentage	FT%	Free throw percentage	RPG	Rebounds per game
APG	Assists per game	SPG	Steals per game	BPG	Blocks per game
PPG	Points per game		Led the league

=== Regular season ===
Player	GP	MPG	PPG	2P%	3P%	FT%	RPG	APG	SPG	BPG
Caelan Tiongson	19	31:15	13.5	43.9%	27.0%	70.0%	9.1	2.6	1.1	0.6
Cheng Wei	30	34:25	10.3	37.8%	36.8%	78.2%	2.2	2.4	0.8	0.0
Elijah Thomas^{≠}	9	26:37	21.4	66.7%	31.3%	69.1%	8.3	1.8	1.3	1.3
Yu Meng-Yun	8	15:36	3.0	38.9%	14.3%	50.0%	1.9	2.1	0.8	0.3
Deyonta Davis	19	31:09	16.4	61.0%	41.2%	58.8%	14.2	1.9	1.4	2.5
Troy Williams	19	32:09	25.8	49.4%	28.3%	66.7%	10.0	2.4	2.0	1.1
Xie Yu-Zheng	23	10:54	2.7	48.8%	26.3%	77.8%	2.1	0.5	0.2	0.0
Lu Chieh-Min	28	32:26	11.7	40.6%	37.5%	84.6%	3.1	1.3	0.8	0.2
Tsai Yang-Ming	20	14:17	3.8	36.4%	35.7%	59.1%	2.5	0.5	0.4	0.1
Chang Shun-Cheng	9	3:46	0.9	80.0%	0.0%	0.0%	0.1	0.3	0.0	0.0
Lo Chen-Feng	12	28:20	10.0	46.2%	35.5%	71.4%	4.4	1.1	0.3	0.3
Du Yu-Cheng	13	27:25	7.2	41.2%	32.4%	70.0%	3.0	1.6	1.0	0.2
Chang Chih-Feng^{≠}	10	30:44	6.8	44.7%	29.2%	86.7%	4.2	2.7	0.6	0.0
John Gillon^{≠}	22	34:20	22.4	58.5%	34.3%	79.0%	5.2	8.2	2.1	0.2
Aleksandar Mitrović^{‡}	6	30:01	17.5	44.1%	13.5%	90.9%	5.7	2.0	0.2	0.3
Wu Chi-Ying	21	14:59	4.1	38.5%	28.3%	100.0%	1.5	1.0	0.5	0.0
Daniel Orton^{‡}	5	32:36	8.8	44.1%	15.0%	45.5%	14.8	3.6	1.2	2.8
Liu Hung-Po	Did not play									
Huang Yi-Sheng	16	8:23	1.4	75.0%	22.7%	50.0%	0.4	0.1	0.1	0.0

^{‡} Left during the season
^{≠} Acquired during the season

=== Play-in ===
Player	GP	MPG	PPG	2P%	3P%	FT%	RPG	APG	SPG	BPG
Caelan Tiongson	Did not play									
Cheng Wei	1	29:33	5.0	0.0%	50.0%	100.0%	3.0	1.0	0.0	0.0
Elijah Thomas	Did not play									
Yu Meng-Yun	Did not play									
Deyonta Davis	1	34:21	26.0	70.0%	36.4%	0.0%	7.0	4.0	2.0	1.0
Troy Williams	1	43:12	47.0	56.0%	28.6%	41.2%	9.0	6.0	3.0	0.0
Xie Yu-Zheng	1	5:59	0.0	0.0%	0.0%	0.0%	0.0	0.0	0.0	0.0
Lu Chieh-Min	1	43:09	5.0	25.0%	50.0%	0.0%	4.0	1.0	2.0	0.0
Tsai Yang-Ming	1	8:36	0.0	0.0%	0.0%	0.0%	0.0	0.0	1.0	0.0
Chang Shun-Cheng	Did not play									
Lo Chen-Feng	1	36:57	7.0	100.0%	100.0%	100.0%	2.0	0.0	1.0	2.0
Du Yu-Cheng	Did not play									
Chang Chih-Feng	Did not play									
John Gillon	1	18:27	9.0	100.0%	25.0%	100.0%	3.0	4.0	0.0	0.0
Wu Chi-Ying	1	19:46	11.0	100.0%	50.0%	0.0%	0.0	1.0	0.0	0.0
Liu Hung-Po	Did not play									
Huang Yi-Sheng	Did not play									

- Reference：

== Transactions ==
=== Overview ===
Players added

Via draft

- Chang Shun-Cheng
- Huang Yi-Sheng
- Lo Chen-Feng

Via free agency

- Chang Chih-Feng
- Cheng Wei
- Deyonta Davis
- Du Yu-Cheng
- John Gillon
- Liu Ching
- Liu Hung-Po
- Lu Chieh-Min
- Aleksandar Mitrović
- Daniel Orton
- Elijah Thomas
- Caelan Tiongson
- Tsai Yang-Ming
- Troy Williams
- Wu Chi-Ying
- Xie Yu-Zheng
- Yu Meng-Yun
Players lost

Waived

- Liu Ching
- Aleksandar Mitrović
- Daniel Orton

=== Free agency ===
==== Additions ====
Date	Player	Contract terms	Former team	Ref.
August 27, 2021	Cheng Wei	2-year contract, worth unknown	(Taiwan) Hsinchu JKO Lioneers	
August 31, 2021	Xie Yu-Zheng	—N/a	(Taiwan) HWU	
September 24, 2021	Liu Ching	—N/a	(Taiwan) FJU	
September 24, 2021	Tsai Yang-Ming	—N/a	(Taiwan) Taoyuan Pauian Archiland	
September 24, 2021	Chang Shun-Cheng	—N/a	(Taiwan) UKN	
October 1, 2021	Lo Chen-Feng	3-year contract, worth unknown	(Taiwan) NKNU	
October 4, 2021	Huang Yi-Sheng	—N/a	(Taiwan) SHU	
October 4, 2021	Du Yu-Cheng	—N/a	(Taiwan) Taoyuan Pauian Archiland	
October 4, 2021	Lu Chieh-Min	NT$60,000 per month	(Taiwan) Yulon Luxgen Dinos	
October 15, 2021	Caelan Tiongson	—N/a	(Philippines) San Miguel Alab Pilipinas	
October 22, 2021	Liu Hung-Po	—N/a	(Taiwan) NKNU	
October 22, 2021	Wu Chi-Ying	—N/a	(Taiwan) FJU	
October 22, 2021	Yu Meng-Yun	—N/a	(Taiwan) CCU	
October 27, 2021	Aleksandar Mitrović	—N/a	(Bahrain) Al-Muharraq SC	
November 4, 2021	Daniel Orton	—N/a	(Japan) Aomori Wat's	
November 19, 2021	Deyonta Davis	—N/a	(United States) Santa Cruz Warriors	
November 22, 2021	Troy Williams	—N/a	(Italy) Carpegna Prosciutto Basket Pesaro	
January 7, 2022	John Gillon	—N/a	(Taiwan) Taoyuan Pilots	
February 8, 2022	Chang Chih-Feng	—N/a	(Taiwan) CYCU basketball team coach	
February 18, 2022	Elijah Thomas	—N/a	(United States) Windy City Bulls	

==== Subtractions ====
Date	Player	Reason	New team	Ref.
December 10, 2021	Liu Ching	Contract terminated	(Taiwan) SHU basketball team coach	
December 28, 2021	Daniel Orton	Contract terminated	(United States) La Familia	
April 1, 2022	Aleksandar Mitrović	Contract terminated	(Kuwait) Al-Qurain SC	

== Awards ==
=== Yearly awards ===
Recipient	Award	Ref.
Deyonta Davis	Blocks Leader	
Deyonta Davis	All-Defensive First Team	

=== Import of the Month ===
Month	Recipient	Award	Ref.
April & May	Troy Williams	April & May Import of the Month	
