= List of Taoyuan Taiwan Beer Leopards head coaches =

The Taoyuan Taiwan Beer Leopards are a Taiwanese professional basketball team based in Taoyuan City, Taiwan. The team was formerly known as the Taoyuan Leopards from 2021 to 2023 and Taiwan Beer Leopards from 2023 to 2024. The team is owned by J&V Energy Technology Co., Ltd and coached by Henrik Rödl. The Leopards won 1 T1 League championship and 0 Taiwan Professional Basketball League championship since the team was founded in 2021.

There have been 8 head coaches for the Taoyuan Taiwan Beer Leopards franchise. They won their first T1 League championship in the 2024 T1 League finals coached by Charles Dubé-Brais, but haven't won any Taiwan Professional Basketball League championship.

== Key ==
GC	Games coached
W	Wins
L	Losses
Win%	Winning percentage
#	Number of coaches

== Coaches ==
Note: Statistics are correct through the end of the 2025–26 TPBL season.

#	Name	Term	GC	W	L	Win%	GC	W	L	Win%	Achievements
#	Name	Term	Regular season				Playoffs				Achievements
Taoyuan Leopards
1	Wang Chih-Chun	2021–2022	22	5	17	.227	–	–	–	–	
2	Su Yi-Chieh	2022	5	1	4	.200	–	–	–	–	
3	Liu Chia-Fa	2022–2023	24	7	17	.292	1	0	1	.000	
4	John Bennett	2023	9	1	8	.111	–	–	–	–	
Taiwan Beer Leopards
5	Michael Olson	2023–2024	12	8	4	.667	–	–	–	–	
6	Chou Chun-San	2024	4	3	1	.750	–	–	–	–	
7	Charles Dubé-Brais	2024	12	7	5	.583	7	7	0	1.000	1 T1 League championship (2024)
Taoyuan Taiwan Beer Leopards
—	Charles Dubé-Brais	2024–2025	36	16	20	.444	2	1	1	.500	
8	Henrik Rödl	2025–present	36	23	13	.639	4	1	3	.250	2025–26 TPBL Coach of the Year
