= Adam Łapeta =

Polish basketball player (born 1987)

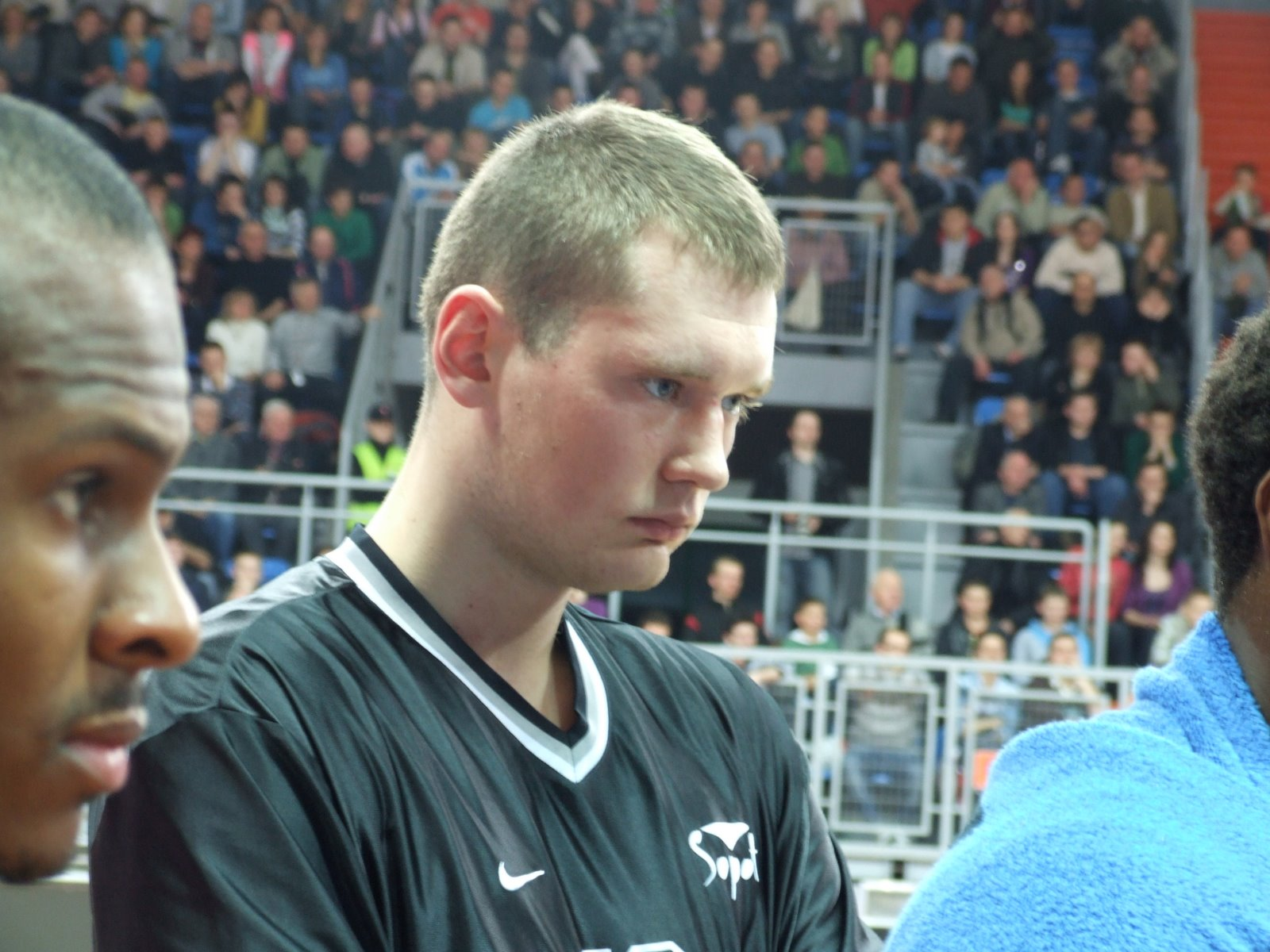

Free Agent
- Position: Center

Personal information
- Born: 9 November 1987 (age 39) Puck, Poland
- Listed height: 7 ft 1.5 in (2.17 m)
- Listed weight: 285 lb (129 kg)

Career information
- NBA draft: 2009: undrafted
- Playing career: 2005–present

Career history
- 2005–2012: Prokom Trefl Sopot
- 2012–2013: Stelmet Zielona Góra
- 2013: Anwil Włocławek
- 2013–2016: Dzūkija Alytus
- 2016–2017: Lietuvos rytas Vilnius
- 2017–2018: Stal Ostrów Wielkopolski
- 2018–2019: Asseco Gdynia
- 2019–2021: Wilki Morskie Szczecin
- 2021–2022: Alytus Dzūkija
- 2022–2023: Taoyuan Leopards
- 2023–2024: Spójnia Stargard
- 2024–2025: MKS Dąbrowa Górnicza
- 2025–2026: Górnik Wałbrzych

Career highlights
- 6× Polish League champion (2006, 2008–2012); 1x Polish League vice champion (2018); 1x Polish League blocks leader (2018); 2x Polish Cup winner (2006, 2008); 1x All-Polish League First Team (2017/2018); King Mindaugas Cup winner (2016)

Adam Łapeta (born 9 November 1987) is a Polish professional basketball player who last played for Górnik Wałbrzych of the Polish Basketball League (PLK).

== Professional career ==
Previously a member of the Prokom Trefl Sopot youth team, Łapeta made his career debut in 2005 on the main squad in the Polish Basketball League (PLK). He played in five consecutive EuroLeague seasons with the team between 2007 and 2012, making his last season the most successful one (4.7 points per game, 4.3 rebounds while shooting 55% from the field and 73% from the free throw line). He played with Zielona Góra in the EuroCup the following year.

In 2013, he moved to Dzūkija Alytus of the Lithuanian Basketball League (LKL). He became a center piece of the team, leading the league in blocks per game during his first season there (with 1.5). He was traded for Julius Jucikas to Lietuvos rytas Vilnius in early 2016. On 13 September 2017, Łapeta agreed to mutually part ways with Lietuvos rytas Vilnius.

On July 2, 2018, he signed a one-year deal with Asseco Gdynia of the PLK.

On September 14, 2022, Łapeta signed with Taoyuan Leopards of the T1 League.

On March 5, 2023, Taoyuan Leopards terminated the contract relationship with Łapeta due to the injury.

On November 1, 2023, he signed with Spójnia Stargard of the Polish Basketball League (PLK).

On July 22, 2024, he signed with MKS Dąbrowa Górnicza of the Polish Basketball League (PLK).

On September 11, 2025, he signed with Górnik Wałbrzych of the Polish Basketball League (PLK).

== National team career ==
Łapeta represented Poland at the 2005 European U-18 Championship. He also played in EuroBasket 2011, achieving a high of 8 points and 6 rebounds against the tournament hosts Lithuania.

== Honours ==
Prokom Trefl Sopot/Asseco Prokom Gdynia

- Polish PLK Champion: (2006, 2008, 2009, 2010, 2011, 2012)
- Polish Cup Winner: 2006, 2008
- PLK All Star Game 2010

Lietuvos Rytas Vilnius

- Lithuanian LKL Bronze medalist: 2015/2016, 2016/2017
- Lithuanian Basketball Cup Winner: 2016

BM Slam Stal Ostrów Wielkopolski

- Polish PLK Vice Champion: (2018)
- All-PLK First Team 2017/2018
- PLK blocks leader (2017/2018)

Asseco Gdynia

- Polish PLK Bronze medalist: (2019)
