= Aleksandar Mitrović (basketball) =

Serbian basketball player

Partizan Belgrade
- Title: Team manager
- League: Serbian SuperLeague; ABA League; EuroLeague

Personal information
- Born: July 22, 1990 (age 36) Belgrade, Serbia, SFR Yugoslavia
- Listed height: 2.03 m (6 ft 8 in)
- Listed weight: 100 kg (220 lb)

Career information
- NBA draft: 2012: undrafted
- Playing career: 2007–2026
- Position: Shooting guard / small forward

Career history
- 2007–2009: Mega Hypo Leasing
- 2009–2011: Partizan
- 2010–2011: → Budućnost Podgorica
- 2011: → Mega Vizura
- 2011–2012: Metalac Valjevo
- 2012: Peristeri
- 2012–2013: Vršac
- 2013–2014: Zlatorog Laško
- 2015: Rabotnički
- 2015–2016: Academic Plovdiv
- 2017: Mladost Zemun
- 2017: Al Ahli Doha
- 2018: Dinamo Tbilisi
- 2018–2019: Al-Khtot Al-Jawiya
- 2019–2020: Abha Club
- 2020: Borac Banja Luka
- 2020: Al Ittihad Club
- 2021: Al Muharraq SC
- 2021–2022: Taoyuan Leopards
- 2022: Al-Qurain SC
- 2023: Al-Shamal SC
- 2023: IHC Apes
- 2024: Mes Kerman
- 2024–2025: Ohud Medina
- 2025–2026: Qatar SC

Career highlights
- ABA League champion (2010); Serbian League champion (2010); Serbian Cup winner (2010); Macedonian Cup winner (2015); Georgian League champion (2018)
Medals
Men's basketball
Representing Serbia and Montenegro
U16 European Championship
Bronze medal – third place	2006 Spain	U16 National Team

Aleksandar "Aljoša" Mitrović (Serbian Cyrillic: Александар "Аљоша" Митровић; born July 22, 1990) is a Serbian basketball executive and former professional player. He is currently serving as the team manager for Partizan Belgrade of the Serbian SuperLeague, the ABA League and the EuroLeague.

== Professional career ==
On 16 February 2015, he signed with Rabotnički of the Macedonian First League. On 10 May 2015, he parted ways with Rabotnički.

In January 2018, he signed with Dinamo Tbilisi of the Georgian Superliga. In 2018, he signed with Al-Khtot Al-Jawiya. Mitrović spent the 2019-20 season with Abha Club of the Saudi Premier League, averaging 24.4 points per game. On 8 November 2020, he signed with Borac Banja Luka. He played three games for the team, averaging 6.7 points. On 13 November 2020, Mitrović signed with Al-Ittihad Club (Bahrain) of the Bahraini Premier League. On January 26 2021, he signed with Al-Muharraq SC (Bahrain) of the Bahraini Premier League. On October 27 2021, he signed with Taoyuan Leopards of the T1 League. He was injured during the 2021–22 T1 League season and left the team in April 2022. On 14 August 2022, he signed with Al-Qurain SC from Kuwait.

Sporting positions
Preceded by Luka Vukulić	Team manager of KK Partizan; 2026–present	Incumbent
