= Daniel Orton =

American basketball player (born 1990)

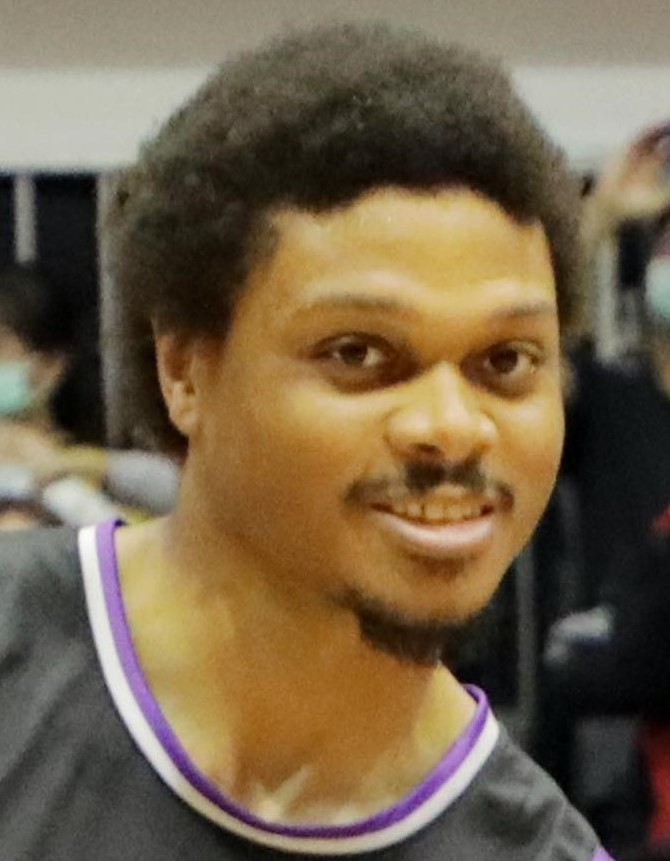
- Orton in 2021.

Personal information
- Born: August 6, 1990 (age 36) Oklahoma City, Oklahoma, U.S.
- Listed height: 6 ft 10 in (2.08 m)
- Listed weight: 265 lb (120 kg)

Career information
- High school: Bishop McGuinness (Oklahoma City, Oklahoma)
- College: Kentucky (2009–2010)
- NBA draft: 2010: 1st round, 29th overall pick
- Drafted by: Orlando Magic
- Playing career: 2010–2021
- Position: Power forward / center
- Number: 21, 33

Career history
- 2010–2012: Orlando Magic
- 2010: →New Mexico Thunderbirds
- 2012–2013: Oklahoma City Thunder
- 2012–2013: →Tulsa 66ers
- 2013–2014: Philadelphia 76ers
- 2014: Maine Red Claws
- 2014–2015: Sichuan Blue Whales
- 2015: Purefoods Star Hotshots
- 2015: Grand Rapids Drive
- 2015–2016: Santa Cruz Warriors
- 2016: Leones de Ponce
- 2016: Hunan Yongsheng
- 2016–2017: Mayrouba Club
- 2017: Kymis
- 2017: Champville
- 2017: Hi-Tech Bangkok City
- 2017–2018: SeaHorses Mikawa
- 2018–2019: Fubon Braves
- 2019: Karesi Spor
- 2019: Koshigaya Alphas
- 2019–2020: Toyama Grouses
- 2020: Kumamoto Volters
- 2020–2021: Aomori Wat's
- 2021: Taoyuan Leopards
- Stats at NBA.com
- Stats at Basketball Reference

Daniel Joseph Orton (born August 6, 1990) is an American former professional basketball player. He is a 6-foot 10-inch, 265-pound center who played college basketball for the Kentucky Wildcats.

== High school career ==
Orton played for Bishop McGuinness High School in Oklahoma City. Bishop McGuinness won the class 4A state championship Orton's freshman, sophomore, and junior year. During his senior season, he tore his anterior cruciate ligament in his knee, cutting his final season of high school basketball short. He averaged 14 points, 11 rebounds and 5 blocks per game as a junior.

Considered a five-star recruit by Rivals.com, Orton was listed as the No. 4 center and the No. 22 player in the nation in 2009.

He was recruited to the University of Kentucky by Billy Gillispie; however, Gillispie was fired following Orton's senior season. Orton kept his commitment to Kentucky after John Calipari was hired by the university.

== College career ==
Orton was a reserve on the 2009–10 Kentucky Wildcats basketball team, where he averaged 3.4 points, 3.3 rebounds, and 1.4 blocks in 13.2 minutes per game. On May 8, 2010, Orton hired an agent and declared himself eligible for the 2010 NBA draft.

== Professional career ==
With the 29th overall picking the first round of 2010 NBA draft, the Orlando Magic selected Daniel Orton. On July 1, 2010, Orton signed his rookie contract with the Magic. On December 1, 2010, it was announced that Orton would be sent to the New Mexico Thunderbirds of the NBA Development League. In his second game for the Thunderbirds, Orton suffered a season-ending knee injury.

Orton made his NBA debut on January 27, 2012, in a Magic loss to the New Orleans Hornets.

On April 15, 2012, in a win against the Cleveland Cavaliers, Orton scored a career-high 11 points while also recording 5 steals, 4 rebounds, and 3 blocks. In 16 games, he averaged 2.8 points per game. He played his first career playoff game against the Indiana Pacers.

On August 4, 2012, Orton was signed by the Oklahoma City Thunder. On October 27, 2012, Orton was released by the Oklahoma City Thunder, after losing out to DeAndre Liggins for the final roster spot during the pre-season. However, he was re-signed by the team on October 31, 2012, after the team had sent center Cole Aldrich to the Houston Rockets in a trade that also involved James Harden. The Thunder assigned Orton to the NBA D-League's Tulsa 66ers several times during the 2012–13 season.

On October 10, 2013, he was waived by the Thunder.

On October 16, 2013, he signed with the Philadelphia 76ers. On November 23, 2013, Orton recorded his first double double with 10 points, a career-high 10 rebounds, and 2 blocks in a 98–106 loss to the Indiana Pacers. On January 7, 2014, he was waived by the 76ers.

On January 22, 2014, the Tulsa 66ers traded Orton's rights to the Maine Red Claws.

In July 2014, he joined the Washington Wizards for the 2014 NBA Summer League. On September 29, 2014, he signed with the Wizards. However, he was later waived by the Wizards on October 16, 2014. The next day, he signed with Shanxi Zhongyu of the Chinese Basketball Association. He was later dismissed by Shanxi in favor of Jeremy Tyler. On December 8, 2014, he signed with the Sichuan Blue Whales for the rest of the 2014–15 CBA season. Following the conclusion of CBA regular season, he terminated his contract with the Blue Whales on February 1, 2015.

On February 4, he signed with Purefoods Star Hotshots of the Philippine Basketball Association. In his first game on February 11, he recorded 16 points and 12 rebounds. After his third game against Kia Carnival, he called Kia player-coach (now Senator) Manny Pacquiao and the game's referees "a joke". He was summoned by PBA commissioner Chito Salud two days after the incident and was fined by the commissioner's office PHP250,000 due to his comments. Subsequently, he was sent home by Purefoods' team governor Rene Pardo on February 21. On March 11, he returned to the D-League, this time joining the Grand Rapids Drive. On March 26, he was waived by the Drive. He appeared in six games for the Drive, averaging 6.7 points and 5.8 rebounds in 18.3 minutes per game. On March 31, he was acquired by the Idaho Stampede, but was deactivated the following day.

On August 20, 2015, Orton signed with AEK Athens. However, he was cut from the team a month later before appearing in a game for them. On November 12, 2015, he was acquired by the Santa Cruz Warriors. On January 18, 2016, he was waived by the Warriors.

On May 24, 2016, Orton signed with Hunan Yongsheng of China for the 2016 NBL season.

On April 12, 2019, he signed with Karesi Spor of the Turkish Basketball First League.

On November 4, 2021, he signed with Taoyuan Leopards of the T1 League.

== NBA career statistics ==
Legend
GP	Games played	GS	Games started	MPG	Minutes per game
FG%	Field goal percentage	3P%	3-point field goal percentage	FT%	Free throw percentage
RPG	Rebounds per game	APG	Assists per game	SPG	Steals per game
BPG	Blocks per game	PPG	Points per game	**Bold**	Career high

=== Regular season ===
Year	Team	GP	GS	MPG	FG%	3P%	FT%	RPG	APG	SPG	BPG	PPG
2011–12	Orlando	16	2	**11.7**	**.567**	.000	.440	2.4	.3	**.5**	.6	2.8
2012–13	Oklahoma City	13	0	8.0	.462	.000	.529	2.0	.3	.3	.2	2.5
2013–14	Philadelphia	**22**	**4**	11.4	.447	.000	**.767**	**2.8**	**.7**	.3	**.7**	**3.0**
Career		51	6	10.6	.485	.000	.597	2.5	.5	.4	.5	2.8

=== Playoffs ===
Year	Team	GP	GS	MPG	FG%	3P%	FT%	RPG	APG	SPG	BPG	PPG
2012	Orlando	4	0	2.3	.000	.000	1.000	.5	.0	.0	.0	1.0
Career		4	0	2.3	.000	.000	1.000	.5	.0	.0	.0	1.0
