= Al-Qurain SC =

Kuwaiti sports club

Al-Qurain SC نادي القرين
- Full name: Al-Qurain Sporting Club
- Nickname(s): The new comers
- Founded: March 23, 2011; 14 years ago
- Ground: Al-Qurain stadium
- Capacity: -
- Chairman: Ahmad Al-Shihoomi
- Manager: -
- League: -
- -: -

Al-Qurain Sporting Club is one of the newer established sporting clubs in Kuwait.

== History ==
After being founded in 2011, they joined the Kuwaiti Handball League the next season.

== Handball ==
=== Domestic ===
- Kuwaiti handball Premier League:0

(runners-up):2

  - 2013–14, 2014–15

- Kuwait Handball Federation Cup:0

(runners-up):2

  - 2012–13, 2014–15

=== international ===
- Arab Handball Championship of Winners' Cup:1

2014

- Asian Club League Handball Championship:0

(third place):1

2014

== Boxing ==
Boxing section was founded in 2012 and the club joined major tournaments in Kuwait and in the GCC.

On November 11, 2015, the club won their inaugural Kuwait Independence Cup and the first club honour.

=== Achievements ===
==== Honours ====
- Kuwait independence Cup:1

2015

==== Medals ====
Total:10

- Gold:4

4 (2015)

- Silver:5

5 (2015)

- Bronze:1

1 (2015)

== See also ==
- List of football clubs in Kuwait
