= Elijah Thomas =

American basketball player (born 1996)

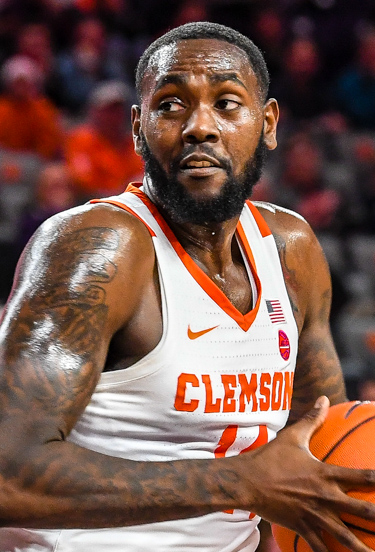
- Thomas with Clemson in 2018

No. 2 – Sagesse SC
- Position: Power forward / center
- League: Lebanese Basketball League

Personal information
- Born: October 10, 1996 (age 30) Dallas, Texas, U.S.
- Listed height: 6 ft 9 in (2.06 m)
- Listed weight: 245 lb (111 kg)

Career information
- High school: Prime Prep (Dallas, Texas); Lancaster (Lancaster, Texas)
- College: Texas A&M (2015–2016); Clemson (2016–2019)
- NBA draft: 2019: undrafted
- Playing career: 2020–present

Career history
- 2020: Larisa
- 2020: Steaua București
- 2021: Bnei Herzliya
- 2021: Grises de Humacao
- 2021: Windy City Bulls
- 2022: Taoyuan Leopards
- 2022: Titanes del Distrito Nacional
- 2022: Gladiadores de Anzoátegui
- 2022: Earthfriends Tokyo Z
- 2023: Kaohsiung Aquas
- 2023: Pioneros de Los Mochis
- 2023: Final Gençlik
- 2023: Wellington Saints
- 2023: Sagesse
- 2024: Çayırova Belediyesi
- 2024: Nalaikh Bison
- 2024–2025: Al-Ahli Manama
- 2025: Beirut Club
- 2026: Al-Ittihad Jeddah
- 2026: Fuerza Regia de Monterrey
- 2026–present: Sagesse

Career highlights
- 2× ACC All-Defensive Team (2018, 2019)

Elijah Reshard Thomas (إليجاه رشارد توماس; born October 10, 1996) is an American-born Bahraini professional basketball player for Sagesse of the Lebanese Basketball League (LBL). He played college basketball for the Texas A&M Aggies and Clemson Tigers.

== Early life ==
Thomas grew up in South Dallas and befriended Jordan Mickey in elementary school. When Deion Sanders opened Prime Prep Academy, both Mickey and Thomas decided to join. Prior to his junior season, Thomas transferred to Lancaster High School in Lancaster, Texas. In the final game of the regular season, he had 39 points and 20 rebounds as Lancaster defeated MacArthur High School 87–66. Thomas was named District 15-4A most valuable player as a junior. As a senior, he helped the team win the Class 5A state championship and averaged 26 points and 14 rebounds per game. Ranked the No. 29 recruit in his class according to ESPN, he committed to Texas A&M, the first school to offer him a scholarship, on October 21, 2014. Thomas chose the Aggies over offers from Illinois, LSU, Oklahoma State and SMU.

== College career ==
Thomas averaged 3.8 points and 2.5 rebounds per game as a freshman, but saw his minutes decline due to the emergence of Tyler Davis. On January 6, 2016, he announced he was transferring to Clemson after taking visits to Nebraska and Arizona. As a sophomore, Thomas averaged 7.5 points and 4.2 rebounds per game. On November 24, 2017, he posted career highs of 26 points and 16 rebounds in an 84–77 victory over Texas Southern. He averaged 10.7 points, 8.1 rebounds, and 2.3 blocks per game as a junior, shooting 56 percent from the floor. Thomas was named to the ACC All-Defensive Team. He had nine double-doubles and helped the Tigers reach to the Sweet 16 of the NCAA tournament for the first time since 1997. As a senior, Thomas averaged 13 points, 7.8 rebounds, and 2.2 blocks per game. He was named to the ACC All-Defensive Team for the second straight season, as well as Honorable Mention All-ACC. He was the seventh Clemson player to compile 900 points, 600 rebounds and 150 blocks.

== Professional career ==
After going undrafted in the 2019 NBA draft, Thomas joined the Charlotte Hornets for NBA Summer League. On July 18, 2019, he signed his first professional contract with Wonju DB Promy of the Korean Basketball League. On October 3, he was replaced by Chinanu Onuaku due to injury. On January 12, 2020, Thomas signed with Larisa of the Greek Basket League. In five games, he averaged 6.4 points and 4.2 rebounds per game.

Thomas started the 2020–21 season in Romania with Steaua București. In January 2021, after initially signing with Kyiv-Basket of the Ukrainian Basketball SuperLeague, he joined Bnei Herzliya of the Israeli Basketball Premier League for the rest of the season.

In August and September 2021, Thomas had a four-game stint in Puerto Rico with Grises de Humacao.

In October 2021, Thomas joined the Windy City Bulls of the NBA G League after a successful tryout. He was waived on December 25, 2021. On February 18, 2022, he signed with Taoyuan Leopards of the T1 League for the rest of the 2021–22 season.

In July 2022, Thomas had a two-game stint with Titanes del Distrito Nacional in the Dominican Republic and a one-game stint with Gladiadores de Anzoátegui in Venezuela.

In August 2022, Thomas signed with Earthfriends Tokyo Z. In November 2022, his contract was terminated. He returned to Taiwan in January 2023 and joined Kaohsiung Aquas. He was released from his contract in March. After a one-game stint with Pioneros de Los Mochis in Mexico, he joined Turkish team Final Gençlik in April 2023.

On June 22, 2023, Thomas signed with the Wellington Saints for the rest of the 2023 New Zealand NBL season.

In November 2023, Thomas had a two-game stint with Sagesse Club of the Lebanese Basketball League.

== National team ==
Thomas has played for the Bahrain national basketball team. He was first selected in the preliminary squad in June 2025, and was named part of the final squad traveling to the 2026 Asian Games in Japan.

== Personal life ==
Thomas is listed to have United States and Rwanda nationality in 2025. He is also reportedly a naturalized citizen of Bahrain.
