= John Gillon =

American basketball player (born 1994)

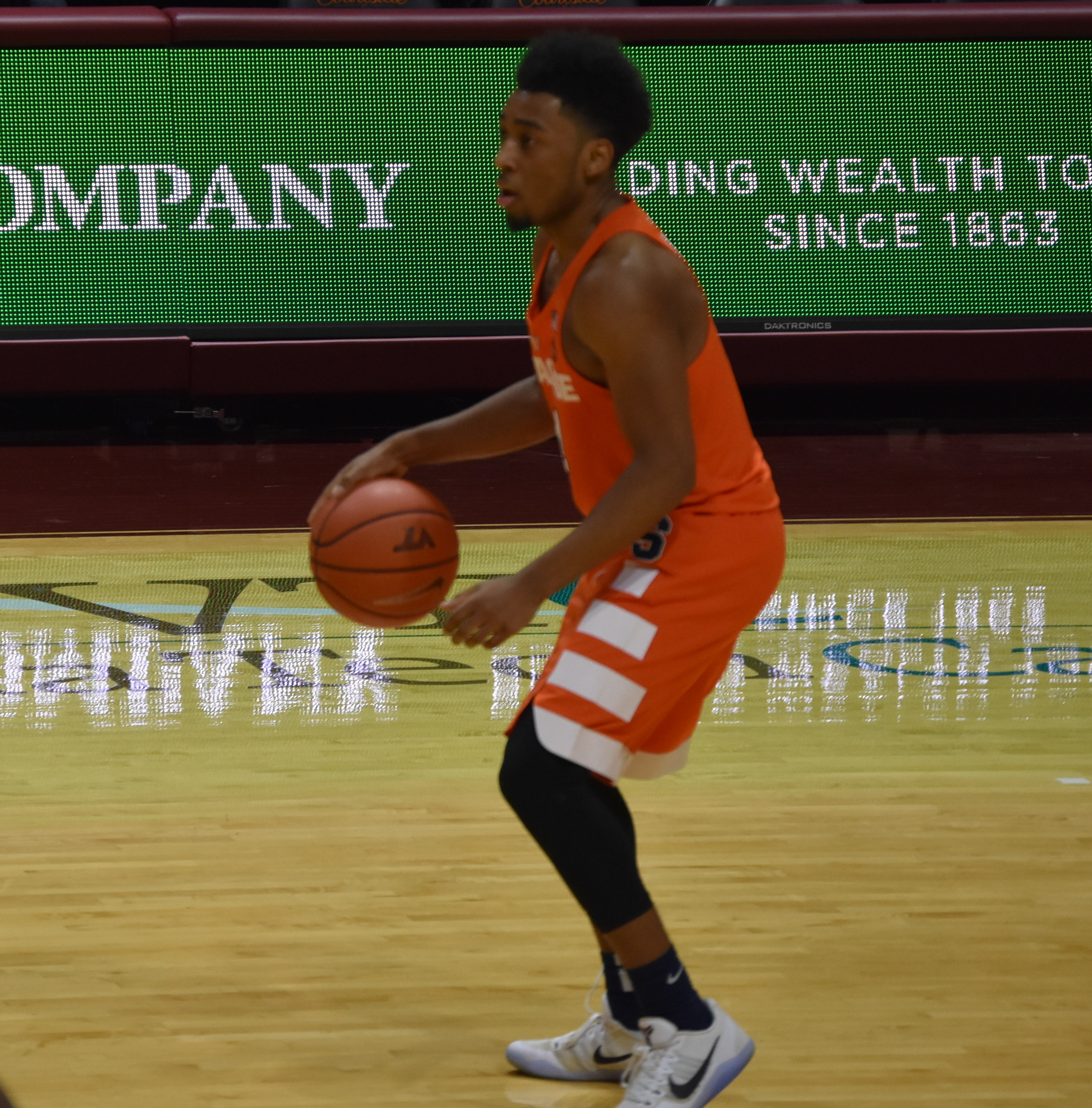
- Gillon playing for Syracuse

Personal information
- Born: March 31, 1994 (age 32) Houston, Texas
- Listed height: 6 ft 0 in (1.83 m)
- Listed weight: 178 lb (81 kg)

Career information
- High school: Strake Jesuit College Prep (Houston, Texas)
- College: Little Rock (2012–2013); Colorado State (2014–2016); Syracuse (2016–2017)
- NBA draft: 2017: undrafted
- Playing career: 2017–2024
- Position: Point guard

Career history
- 2017: Texas Legends
- 2017–2019: Erie BayHawks
- 2019: Greensboro Swarm
- 2019–2020: Pieno žvaigždės Pasvalys
- 2020–2021: Darüşşafaka Tekfen
- 2021: Alba Fehérvár
- 2021–2022: Taoyuan Pilots
- 2022: Taoyuan Leopards
- 2023: Pieno žvaigždės Pasvalys
- 2024: MZT Skopje

Career highlights
- Mountain West Sixth Man of the Year (2015); Macedonian League champion (2024)

John Benjamin Gillon III (born March 31, 1994) is an American former professional basketball player. He played in college for Little Rock, Colorado State, and Syracuse.

== College career ==
Gillon started his collegiate career at Arkansas-Little Rock, where he averaged 10.6 points in his freshman season. Afterwards, he decided to transfer to Colorado State where, under NCAA transfer rules, he would redshirt during his first year there. During his redshirt sophomore year he would only start one game for Colorado State, and averaged 7.9 points. The following season that number would improve to 13.2 points per game, and he also shot 88% from the free throw line.

After graduating from Colorado State, with one more year of remaining college eligibility Gillon decided to transfer again to Syracuse. His scoring numbers took a dip, averaging 10.5 per game, however he led the team in assists per game with 5.4, which was also his career-best. He also ended up setting the school record for most consecutive free throws made, with 48. That also tied for the third most consecutive free throws made in ACC history. On February 22, 2017, during a game in the Carrier Dome against Duke, Gillon made a last second three pointer to win the game, with a final score of 75–78.

== Professional career ==
=== 2017–18 season ===
After going undrafted in the 2017 NBA draft, Gillon was taken by the Texas Legends in the annual NBA G-League Draft, where he would play five games and average 3.6 points per game before getting waived on November 28. On December 3, Gillon was picked up by the Erie BayHawks, reuniting with former Syracuse teammate, Andrew White. Gillon had 40 points in a win against the Fort Wayne Mad Ants on March 24, 2018.

=== 2018–19 season ===
Gillon was added to the training camp roster of the Erie BayHawks in October 2018. On February 21, 2019, he was traded to the Greensboro Swarm for Cat Barber.

=== 2019–20 season ===
On September 6, 2019, Gillon signed with Pieno žvaigždės Pasvalys of the Lithuanian Basketball League. He averaged 13.1 points, 4.4 assists, and 2.2 rebounds per game.

=== 2020–21 season ===
On July 5, 2020, Gillon signed with Darüşşafaka Tekfen of the Turkish Basketbol Süper Ligi.

On February 18, 2021, Gillon signed with Alba Fehérvár of the NB I/A.

=== 2021–22 season ===
On November 9, 2021, Gillon signed with Taoyuan Pilots of the P. League+.

On January 7, 2022, Gillon signed with Taoyuan Leopards of the T1 League.

== The Basketball Tournament ==
John Gillon played for Boeheim's Army in the 2018 edition of The Basketball Tournament. In 4 games, he averaged 14.5 points, 3.5 assists, and 1.8 rebounds per game. Boeheim's Army reached the Northeast Regional Championship before falling to the Golden Eagles.
