= Deyonta Davis =

American basketball player (born 1996)

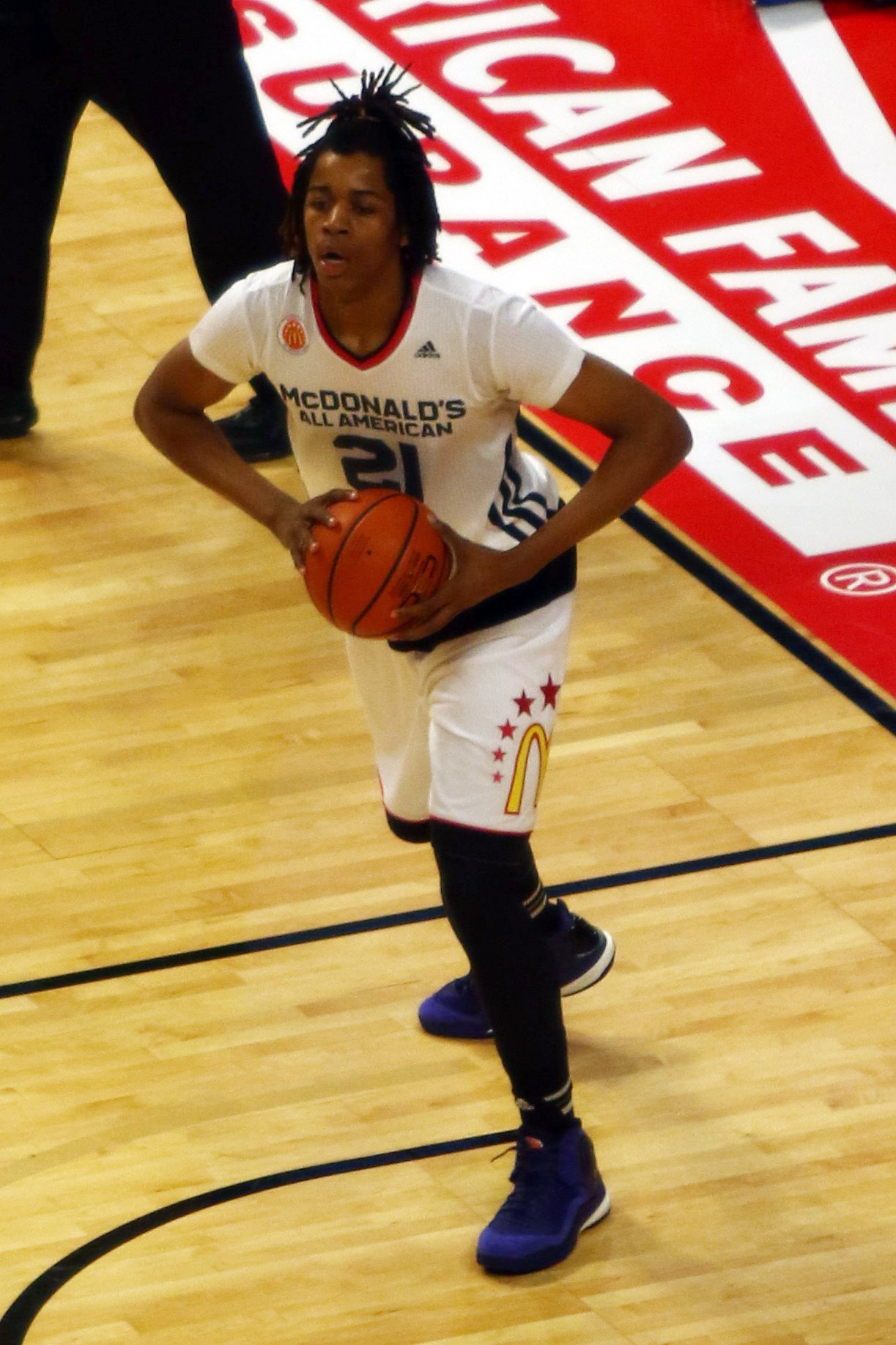
- Davis at the McDonald's All-American Game in 2015

Free Agent
- Position: Power forward / center

Personal information
- Born: December 2, 1996 (age 29) Muskegon, Michigan, U.S.
- Listed height: 6 ft 11 in (2.11 m)
- Listed weight: 237 lb (108 kg)

Career information
- High school: Muskegon (Muskegon, Michigan)
- College: Michigan State (2015–2016)
- NBA draft: 2016: 2nd round, 31st overall pick
- Drafted by: Boston Celtics
- Playing career: 2016–present

Career history
- 2016–2018: Memphis Grizzlies
- 2017: →Iowa Energy
- 2017: →Memphis Hustle
- 2018–2019: Santa Cruz Warriors
- 2019: Atlanta Hawks
- 2019–2020: Santa Cruz Warriors
- 2021–2023: Taoyuan Leopards
- 2023: Goyang Sono Skygunners
- 2023–2024: Hsinchu Toplus Lioneers

Career highlights
- 2× T1 League All-Defensive First Team (2022, 2023); 2× T1 League blocks leader (2022, 2023); McDonald's All-American (2015); First-team Parade All-American (2015); Mr. Basketball of Michigan (2015)
- Stats at NBA.com
- Stats at Basketball Reference

Deyonta Davis (born December 2, 1996) is an American professional basketball player. He won the Mr. Basketball of Michigan in 2015 and appeared in the McDonald's All-American Boys Game the same year. He played one season of college basketball for the Michigan State Spartans before being drafted by the Boston Celtics with the 31st overall pick in the 2016 NBA draft before being traded to the Memphis Grizzlies on draft night.

== High school career ==
Davis attended Muskegon High School in Muskegon, Michigan. In his final season, he recorded 4 points and 12 rebounds in the state regional finals, as Muskegon escaped Hudsonville in quadruple-overtime. He played his final game for the Big Reds on March 24, 2015, in a 52–75 quarterfinals loss to Everett High School. He contributed 12 points, 8 rebounds, and 5 blocks. It was played only three miles from the Michigan State University campus. Davis said after the loss, "It was very important [to help my team advance]. We came out ready to play, but the game just didn't go our way." The game was attended by MSU assistant basketball coach Dwayne Stephens, who helped recruit him to his team. Davis also got the chance to meet Spartans players before competing. As Muskegon's star left his team, head coach Keith Guy said, "The future is bright. Two games don't define his career."

By the end of the season, Davis was named Mr. Basketball of Michigan for 2015. In the balloting, he earned a total of 5,223 points. Arthur Hill's Eric Davis and Everett's Trevor Manuel finished after him, getting 3,757 and 2,837 points respectively. The award was won by two straight players from Muskegon High School, Deshaun Thrower winning in 2014. Big Red coach Guy complemented his team, saying, "To have another kid win it for the second consecutive year, it shows how far our program has come the last three years." Davis was given his personal Mr. Basketball trophy between the quarters of the Michigan state title game, in which Saginaw's Arthur Hill played against Detroit's Western International. He said in disappointment, "I'd much rather be on the floor playing right now."

On April 1, 2015, Davis competed in the 2015 McDonald's All-American Boys Game, playing for the West team. He played alongside the likes of Brandon Ingram, Allonzo Trier and Jalen Brunson and against future NBA All-Stars Jaylen Brown and Ben Simmons, and other high school phenomenon's like Diamond Stone and Cheick Diallo. Davis finished the game with 6 points and 9 rebounds, leading his team in the latter category. In January, when he was named to the game, Bank Hoops scout Steve Bell said, "This is huge for West Michigan." The forward was the first player from that region to appear at the stage since Matt Steigenga in 1988.

== College career ==
Davis played one season at Michigan State, averaging 7.5 points per game, 5.5 rebounds per game, and 1.6 blocks per game. Davis started 16 of the final 17 games of the season for the Spartans. Davis was a key part to Michigan States record setting start to the season, Big Ten tournament championship, and MSU's 2nd overall final rank in the AP Poll. He set the school freshman record with 64 blocked shots, second-most in a single season in program history.

== Professional career ==
=== Memphis Grizzlies (2016–2018) ===
Davis declared for the draft on April 12, 2016. Davis and teammate Denzel Valentine were selected to attend the 2016 NBA Combine. Davis hired Bill Duffy as his agent.

While Davis was consistently labelled as a lottery selection all the way until the day of the draft, he was chosen by the Boston Celtics with the 31st overall pick. He therefore became the first green room invitee to not hear his name get called in the first round since Maciej Lampe in 2003's NBA draft. Davis' rights were later traded to the Memphis Grizzlies on draft night.

On July 12, 2016, Davis signed a fully guaranteed three-year, $4-million contract with the Memphis Grizzlies. The deal marked the richest guaranteed salary for an American-born second-round pick in NBA history. On December 15, 2016, he was ruled out for six to eight weeks with a torn plantar fascia in his left foot. During his rookie and sophomore seasons, Davis received multiple assignments to the Iowa Energy and the Memphis Hustle, the Grizzlies' G League affiliates.

=== Santa Cruz Warriors (2018–2019) ===
On July 17, 2018, Davis was traded, along with Ben McLemore, a 2021 second-round pick and cash considerations, to the Sacramento Kings in exchange for Garrett Temple. On September 22, 2018, Davis was waived by the Kings.

On October 11, 2018, Davis signed with the Golden State Warriors. The Warriors released him on October 12. He was then added to the Warriors’ G League affiliate, the Santa Cruz Warriors.

=== Atlanta Hawks (2019) ===
On March 19, 2019, Davis was called up to the Atlanta Hawks and signed a 10-day contract. He signed a second 10-day contract on March 29. On April 8, 2019, following the expiration of his second 10-day contract with Atlanta, Davis signed a multi-year contract with the Hawks. On June 10, 2019, Davis was waived by the Hawks. He averaged four points and four rebounds in nine games. On the same day, Davis was claimed off free-agency waivers by the Houston Rockets. On July 30, 2019, he was waived.

=== Return to Santa Cruz (2019–2020) ===
On October 29, 2019, Davis was included in the training camp roster of the Santa Cruz Warriors. On February 23, 2020, Davis posted 18 points, 11 rebounds, two assists, two steals and two blocks in a loss against the Stockton Kings for his sixth straight double-double. He averaged 11.5 points and 8.2 rebounds per game in 2019–20.

=== Taoyuan Leopards (2021–2023) ===
On November 19, 2021, Davis signed with the Taoyuan Leopards of the T1 League. He was the league's blocks leader for the 2021–22 season. On June 30, 2022, Davis was selected to the all-defensive first team of the T1 League in 2021–22 season. Davis re-signed with the Taoyuan Leopards. He was the league's blocks leader for the 2022–23 season. On May 10, 2023, Davis was selected to the all-defensive first team of the T1 League in 2022–23 season.

=== Goyang Sono Skygunners (2023) ===
On July 17, 2023, Davis signed with the Taichung Suns of the T1 League. On October 5, Davis signed with the Goyang Sono Skygunners of the Korean Basketball League. On December 26, Davis was replaced by DaJuan Summers.

=== Hsinchu Toplus Lioneers (2023–2024) ===
On December 26, 2023, Davis joined the Hsinchu Lioneers of the P. League+.

== Career statistics ==
Legend
GP	Games played	GS	Games started	MPG	Minutes per game
FG%	Field goal percentage	3P%	3-point field goal percentage	FT%	Free throw percentage
RPG	Rebounds per game	APG	Assists per game	SPG	Steals per game
BPG	Blocks per game	PPG	Points per game	**Bold**	Career high

=== NBA ===
==== Regular season ====
Year	Team	GP	GS	MPG	FG%	3P%	FT%	RPG	APG	SPG	BPG	PPG
2016–17	Memphis	36	0	6.6	.511	–	.556	1.7	0.1	0.1	0.5	1.6
2017–18	Memphis	**62**	**6**	**15.2**	.608	–	**.667**	**4.0**	**0.6**	0.2	**0.6**	**5.8**
2018–19	Atlanta	9	0	13.1	**.682**	**.000**	.600	**4.0**	**0.6**	**0.3**	**0.6**	4.0
Career		107	6	12.1	.599	.000	.635	3.2	0.4	0.2	0.6	4.2

==== Playoffs ====
Year	Team	GP	GS	MPG	FG%	3P%	FT%	RPG	APG	SPG	BPG	PPG
2017	Memphis	3	0	3.7	.600	.000	.500	1.7	0.0	0.0	0.0	2.3
Career		3	0	3.7	.600	.000	.500	1.7	0.0	0.0	0.0	2.3

=== College ===
Year	Team	GP	GS	MPG	FG%	3P%	FT%	RPG	APG	SPG	BPG	PPG
2015–16	Michigan State	35	16	18.6	.598	.000	.605	5.5	.7	.3	1.8	7.5
