= Hsing Wu University =

University in Linkou, New Taipei, Taiwan

- 醒吾科技大學
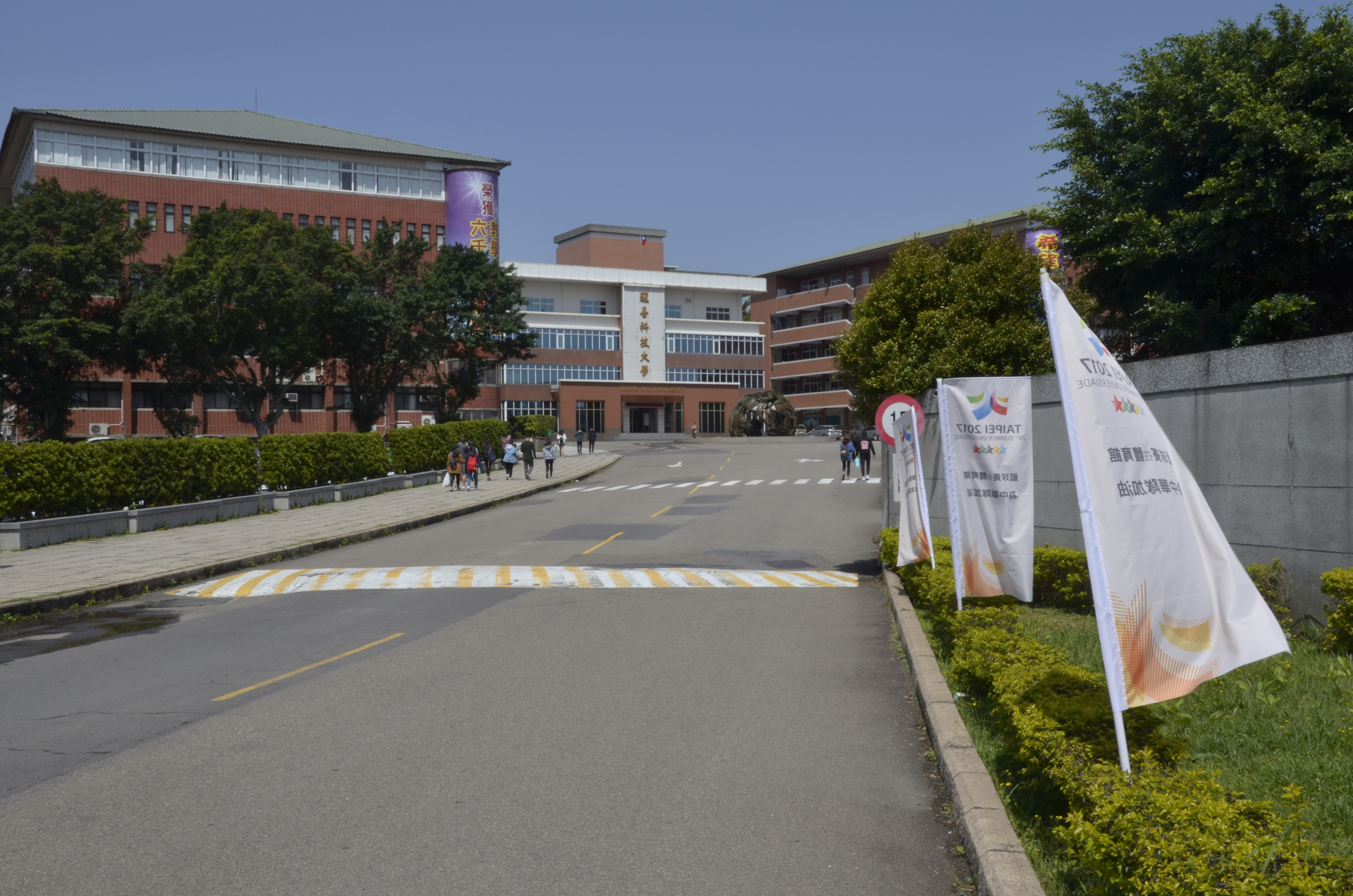
- Motto: 希望·活力·卓越(Pe̍h-ōe-jī: Hi-bāng, oa̍h-le̍k, tok-oa̍t) Hope, Energetic, Excellence
- Type: Private
- Established: 1965; 2012 (as HWU)
- President: 陳義文 Chen, Yi Wen
- Location: Linkou, New Taipei, Taiwan
- Website: Official website

Hsing Wu University
- Traditional Chinese: 醒吾科技大學
- Simplified Chinese: 醒吾科技大学
Transcriptions
Standard Mandarin
- Hanyu Pinyin: Xǐngwú Kējì Dàxué
Southern Min
- Hokkien POJ: Séng-ngô͘ Kho-ki Tāi-ha̍k

Hsing Wu University (HWU; Chinese: 醒吾科技大學; Pe̍h-ōe-jī: Séng-ngô͘ Kho-ki Tāi-ha̍k) is a private university located in Linkou District, New Taipei, Taiwan.

== History ==
HWU was originally established in 1965. It was upgraded to Hsing Wu College in 2000 and to Hsing Wu University in 2012.

== President ==
Period	President's name
1965-1968	單繩武 (Pe̍h-ōe-jī: Siān Sêng-bú)
1968-1978	左潞生 (Pe̍h-ōe-jī: Chó Lō͘-seng)
1978-1996	顧建東 (Pe̍h-ōe-jī: Kò͘ Kiàn-tong)
1996-2001	任遵時 (Pe̍h-ōe-jī: Jîm Chun-sî)
2001-2008	袁保新 (Pe̍h-ōe-jī: Oân Pó-sin)
2008-2010	周家華 (Pe̍h-ōe-jī: Chiu Ka-hôa)
2010-2015	周添城 (Pe̍h-ōe-jī: Chiu Thiam-sêng)
2015-2019	周燦德 (Pe̍h-ōe-jī: Chiu Chhàn-tek)
2019-present	陳義文 (Pe̍h-ōe-jī: Tân Gī-bûn)

== Notable alumni ==
- Liu Ping-wei, politician, member of the Legislative Yuan (1999–2002)
- Danson Tang, model, actor and singer
- Mini Tsai, actress, singer and television host
- Prince Chiu, model, actor, singer, and television host
- Puff Kuo, singer, across, and actor

== Transportation ==
The university is accessible northeast from Chang Gung Memorial Hospital Station of Taoyuan Airport MRT.

== See also ==
- List of universities in Taiwan
