= Chang Chih-feng =

Taiwanese basketball player (born 1981)

Chang Chih-Feng 張智峰
Personal information
- Born: April 22, 1981 (age 45) Taipei, Taiwan
- Listed height: 6 ft 0 in (1.83 m)
- Listed weight: 205 lb (93 kg)

Career information
- High school: National Pingtung High School (國立屏東高級中學), Taiwan
- College: Taipei Physical Education College
- Playing career: 1999–2022
- Position: Shooting guard / small forward

Career history

Playing
- 1999–2001: LUCKIPar
- 2001–2018: Dacin Engineering
- 2002: Beijing Olympians
- 2022: Taoyuan Leopards

Coaching
- 2017–2019: Dacin Engineering
- 2019–present: Chung Yuan Christian University
Medals
Men's basketball
Representing Chinese Taipei
FIBA Asia Challenge
Bronze medal – third place	2004 Taipei
East Asian Games
Silver medal – second place	2009 Hong Kong

Chang Chih-Feng (Chinese: 張智峰; pinyin: Zhāng Zhìfēng; born 22 April 1981 in Pingtung County, Taiwan) is a Taiwanese professional basketball coach. He formerly played for the Dacin Tigers of the Super Basketball League.

A high-school superstar, Chang have started his professional career early with the historical Chinese Basketball Alliance of Taiwan right before the league's termination in 1999. Since then, Chang had competed in the amateur Division A conference (甲組聯賽) of Taiwan and the second-tier National Basketball League of the People's Republic of China until the inauguration of the semi-pro Super Basketball League (SBL) in Taiwan in 2003. Chang currently plays shooting guard for the Dacin Tigers of the SBL where he won two stealing champion titles in addition to two most valuable player (MVP) awards. Named MVP for both the 2008-2009 regular season and the 2009 championship series against the then-defending champions Taiwan Beer, he led the Tigers to their first championship in franchise history.

Chang Chih-Feng was also a member of the Chinese Taipei men's national basketball team when his squad registered an improved fifth-place finish at FIBA Asia Championship 2009. He averaged 7.4 points per game in the tournament.

Although widely recognized as a diligent athlete and especially a tenacious defender, Chang's playing style is somewhat controversial as he is often accused of committing flagrant fouls purposely.

On February 8, 2022, Chang signed with Taoyuan Leopards of the T1 League. He suffered a season-ending hand injury in a game against the TaiwanBeer HeroBears on April 5, 2022.

Chang is nicknamed "Beast Master" for his ability to guard Lin Chih-chieh, who was known as the "Beast".
