= Su I-chieh =

Taiwanese basketball player

Su I-Chieh
Personal information
- Born: January 28, 1987 (age 39) Keelung, Taiwan
- Listed height: 5 ft 11 in (1.80 m)
- Position: Point Guard
- Number: 2

Su I-Chieh (born 28 January 1987 in Keelung) is a Taiwanese professional basketball player. Su also plays for the Chinese Taipei national basketball team and made his national team debut at the FIBA Asia Championship 2009.

Born in Taipei, the 22-year-old Su played primarily off the bench for the Chinese Taipei team at the 2009 Asian Championship. In his most extensive action of the tournament, he had game highs in assists in Chinese Taipei's preliminary round victories over Kuwait and Uzbekistan.

On October 28, 2022, the Taoyuan Leopards of the T1 League announced Su's return as an active player. During the season, he was also general manager of and head coach of the team, serving in his former role until his resignation on December 19, 2022. Su made his T1 League debut on 24 December 2022, and reunited with head coach Liu Chia-fa, who last coached Su with the Dacin Tigers of the Super Basketball League. On April 26, 2023, Su announced that he left the Taoyuan Leopards.
