= Taoyuan Taiwan Beer Leopards =

Professional basketball team in Taiwan

- 2026–27 Taoyuan Taiwan Beer Leopards season
- Leagues: Taiwan Professional Basketball League
- Founded: August 6, 2021
- History: Taoyuan Leopards; 2021–2023 (T1); Taiwan Beer Leopards; 2023–2024 (T1); Taoyuan Taiwan Beer Leopards; 2024–present (TPBL)
- Arena: Taoyuan Arena
- Capacity: 8,700
- Location: Taoyuan City, Taiwan
- Team colors: Green, yellow, purple
- Main sponsor: Bank SinoPac
- CEO: Chang Chien-Wei
- President: Liu Chin-Liang
- Head coach: Henrik Rödl
- Ownership: J&V Energy Technology Co., Ltd
- Championships: 1 T1: 1 (2024)
- Website: t-leopards.com

The Taoyuan Taiwan Beer Leopards (Chinese: 桃園台啤永豐雲豹) are a Taiwanese professional basketball team based in Taoyuan City. They have competed in the Taiwan Professional Basketball League (TPBL) and play their home games at the Taoyuan Arena. Leopards became one of the six teams of the inaugural T1 League season, and one of the seven teams of the inaugural TPBL season.

== Franchise history ==
On August 6, 2021, the T1 League announced that Taoyuan Leopards would join the competition.

On July 4, 2023, Taoyuan Leopards announced to cooperate with the Taiwan Beer basketball association, and changed the name to TaiwanBeer Leopards.

On June 1, 2024, Taiwan Beer Leopards defeated Taipei Mars by 4–0, winning the 2023–24 season championship. On July 9, Taiwan Beer Leopards announced to join the Taiwan Professional Basketball League (TPBL).

== Facilities ==
=== Home arenas ===
| Arena | Location | Duration |
|---|---|---|
| Chung Yuan Christian University Gymnasium | Taoyuan City | 2021–2022 |
| National Taiwan Sport University Arena | Taoyuan City | 2022–2023 |
| Taipei Heping Basketball Gymnasium | Taipei City | 2022 |
| Taoyuan Arena | Taoyuan City | 2022; 2023–present |
| Taoyuan City Zhongli Civil Sports Center | Taoyuan City | 2026 |

=== Training facilities ===
The Leopards' training facility is located at the Taiwan Beer gymnasium. The Leopards previously practiced at the New Taipei City Linkou Civil Sports Center.

== Current roster ==
Taoyuan Taiwan Beer Leopards roster
Players
Coaches

| Pos. | No. | Nat. | Name | Ht. | Wt. | Age | From |
|---|---|---|---|---|---|---|---|
| PG | 5 | (Taiwan) | Gao Jin-Wei (C) | 1.77 m (5 ft 10 in) | 66 kg (146 lb) | 26 – 23 October 2000 | UCH |
| PG | 6 | (Taiwan) | Hsu Hong-Wei | 1.73 m (5 ft 8 in) | 77 kg (170 lb) | 24 – 15 October 2002 | UCH |
| SG | 8 | (Taiwan) | Wang Jhe-Yu | 1.90 m (6 ft 3 in) | 88 kg (194 lb) | 24 – 18 March 2002 | NTUST |
| F | 9 | (Taiwan) | Chang Chao-Chen | 1.96 m (6 ft 5 in) | 97 kg (214 lb) | 26 – 2 September 2000 | NTNU |
| F | 10 | (Australia) | Brock Motum (I) | 2.08 m (6 ft 10 in) | 111 kg (245 lb) | 36 – 16 October 1990 | Washington State |
| PG | 11 | (Taiwan) | Chuang Po-Yuan | 1.85 m (6 ft 1 in) | 85 kg (187 lb) | 25 – 1 December 2000 | FJU |
| SF | 12 | (Taiwan) | Lin Sin-Kuan | 1.92 m (6 ft 4 in) | 92 kg (203 lb) | 24 – 9 May 2002 | NTNU |
| SF | 13 | (United States) | Malcolm Miller (I) | 2.01 m (6 ft 7 in) | 95 kg (209 lb) | 33 – 6 March 1993 | Holy Cross |
| SF | 18 | (Nigeria) | Humphery Gabriel (I) | 1.95 m (6 ft 5 in) | 90 kg (198 lb) | 28 – 15 December 1997 | VNU |
| SF | 20 | (United States) | Thomas Wimbush (I) | 2.01 m (6 ft 7 in) | 91 kg (201 lb) | 32 – 8 December 1993 | Fairmont State |
| F | 21 | (Taiwan) | Wang Hao-Chi | 1.95 m (6 ft 5 in) | 95 kg (209 lb) | 37 – 22 September 1989 | HWU |
| PG | 23 | (United States) (Taiwan) | Kenneth Chien | 1.86 m (6 ft 1 in) | 88 kg (194 lb) | 31 – 6 February 1995 | Broward |
| SF | 27 | (Taiwan) | Huang Jhen | 1.93 m (6 ft 4 in) | 86 kg (190 lb) | 36 – 27 June 1990 | FJU |
| SF | 31 | (Taiwan) | Tung Yung-Chuan | 1.90 m (6 ft 3 in) | 92 kg (203 lb) | 27 – 14 October 1999 | NTNU |
| PG | 57 | (Taiwan) (Vietnam) | Tsao Xun-Xiang | 1.83 m (6 ft 0 in) | 80 kg (176 lb) | 27 – 16 March 1999 | NTUA |
| C | 82 | (Taiwan) | Liu Yuan-Kai | 2.06 m (6 ft 9 in) | 105 kg (231 lb) | 35 – 9 July 1991 | FJU |

Head coach

- (Germany) Henrik Rödl

Assistant coach(es)

- (Taiwan) (Australia) Oscar Lin
- (Germany) Florian Wedell
- (Canada) Vincent Plante

Strength & conditioning coach(es)

- (Taiwan) Chen Tzu-Yi
- (Taiwan) Chou Tzu-Yao

Athletic trainer(s)

- (Taiwan) Chen Wei-Chih
- (Taiwan) Cheng Po-Wei

Legend

- (C) Team captain
- (I) Import player
- Injured

- Roster
- Transactions
Updated: November 14, 2026

== Season-by-season record ==
| Season | League | Coach | Regular season | | | | Postseason | Asian competition | | | | | |
| Season | League | Coach | Won | Lost | Win % | Finish | Postseason | League | Won | Lost | Win % | Finish | Result |
|---|---|---|---|---|---|---|---|---|---|---|---|---|---|
| 2021–22 | T1 | Wang Chih-Chun | 8 | 22 | .267 | 5th | Lost play-in (HeroBears) 0–2 | Did not participate | | | | | |
| 2021–22 | T1 | Su Yi-Chieh | 8 | 22 | .267 | 5th | Lost play-in (HeroBears) 0–2 | Did not participate | | | | | |
| 2021–22 | T1 | Liu Chia-Fa | 8 | 22 | .267 | 5th | Lost play-in (HeroBears) 0–2 | Did not participate | | | | | |
| 2022–23 | T1 | Liu Chia-Fa | 6 | 24 | .200 | 6th | Did not qualify | Did not participate | | | | | |
| 2022–23 | T1 | John Bennett | 6 | 24 | .200 | 6th | Did not qualify | Did not participate | | | | | |
| 2023–24 | T1 | Michael Olson | 18 | 10 | .643 | 2nd | Won semifinals (Aquas) 3–0; Won finals (Mars) 4–0 | Did not participate | | | | | |
| 2023–24 | T1 | Chou Chun-San | 18 | 10 | .643 | 2nd | Won semifinals (Aquas) 3–0; Won finals (Mars) 4–0 | Did not participate | | | | | |
| 2023–24 | T1 | Charles Dubé-Brais | 18 | 10 | .643 | 2nd | Won semifinals (Aquas) 3–0; Won finals (Mars) 4–0 | Did not participate | | | | | |
| 2024–25 | TPBL | Charles Dubé-Brais | 16 | 20 | .444 | 5th | Lost play-in (Mars) 1–2 | Did not participate | | | | | |
| 2025–26 | TPBL | Henrik Rödl | 23 | 13 | .639 | 1st | Lost semifinals (Kings) 1–3 | Did not participate | | | | | |
| 2026–27 | TPBL | Henrik Rödl | 2 | 2 | .500 | | | Did not participate | | | | | |
| Totals | | | 73 | 91 | .445 | – | 4 Playoff appearances | – | 0 | 0 | – | – | 0 Playoff appearances |

== Notable players ==
Local players

- (Taiwan) Chang Chih-Feng (張智峰) – Chinese Taipei national team player, SBL MVP (2009), SBL Finals MVP (2009)
- (Taiwan) Chiang Yu-An (蔣淯安) – Chinese Taipei national team player, SBL Finals MVP (2020), SBL MVP (2019, 2020), T1 League MVP (2022)
- (Taiwan) Gao Jin-Wei (高錦瑋) – Chinese Taipei national team player, TPBL MVP (2026)
- (Taiwan) Huang Jhen (黃鎮) – Chinese Taipei national team player
- (Taiwan) Lee Chi-Wei (李啟瑋) – Chinese Taipei national team player
- (Taiwan) Lin Sin-Kuan (林信寬) – Chinese Taipei national team player
- (Taiwan) Lin Yi-Huei (林宜輝) – Chinese Taipei national team player
- (Taiwan) Su Yi-Chieh (蘇翊傑) – Chinese Taipei national team player, SBL Final MVP (2017)
- (Taiwan) Wang Hao-Chi (王皓吉) – Chinese Taipei national team player

Import players

- DeMarcus Cousins – NBA player, United States national team player, T1 League Finals MVP (2024)
- (United States) Deyonta Davis – NBA player
- (Mali) Cheick Diallo – NBA player
- (United States) Michael Efevberha – Nigeria national team player
- Dwight Howard – NBA player, United States national team player
- Daniel Johnson – Australia national team player
- Adam Łapeta – Poland national team player
- (United States) Chris McCullough – NBA player
- (United States) Malcolm Miller – NBA player
- Egidijus Mockevičius – Lithuania national team player
- Brock Motum – Australia national team player
- (United States) Daniel Orton – NBA player
- (United States) Earnest Ross – Guam national team player
- (United States) Larry Sanders – NBA player
- Axel Toupane – NBA player, France national team player
- Devin Williams – United States national team player
- (United States) Troy Williams – NBA player
- (United States) Thomas Wimbush – VTB United League Supercup MVP (2022)
