= 2024 T1 League finals =

Taiwanese basketball championship

Team	Coach	Wins
Taiwan Beer Leopards	Charles Dubé-Brais	4
Taipei Mars	Hsu Hao-Cheng	0
- Dates: May 24 – June 1, 2024
- MVP: DeMarcus Cousins (Taiwan Beer Leopards)

The 2024 T1 League finals was the championship series of the T1 League's 2023–24 season and conclusion of the season's playoffs. The best-of-seven final series was played by the winners of the semifinals series. The finals series started on May 24 and ended on June 7. The series was matched by Taiwan Beer Leopards and Taipei Mars. On June 1, the Taiwan Beer Leopards defeated the Taipei Mars, 4–0, winning the 2023–24 season championship. DeMarcus Cousins of the Taiwan Beer Leopards was named the Finals MVP.

== Bracket ==
Semifinals
1	New Taipei CTBC DEA	2
4	**Taipei Mars**	**3**
2	**Taiwan Beer Leopards**	**3**
3	Kaohsiung Aquas	0

Finals
4	Taipei Mars	0
2	**Taiwan Beer Leopards**	**4**

Bold: Series winner
Italic: Team with home-court advantage

== Background ==
=== Road to the finals ===
Taiwan Beer Leopards (2nd seed)

Taipei Mars (4th seed)

Team	GP	W	L	PCT	GB
New Taipei CTBC DEA	28	19	9	.679	—
**Taiwan Beer Leopards**	28	18	10	.643	1
Kaohsiung Aquas	28	15	13	.536	4
Taipei Mars	28	11	17	.393	8
Tainan TSG GhostHawks	28	7	21	.250	12

Regular season

Team	GP	W	L	PCT	GB
New Taipei CTBC DEA	28	19	9	.679	—
Taiwan Beer Leopards	28	18	10	.643	1
Kaohsiung Aquas	28	15	13	.536	4
**Taipei Mars**	28	11	17	.393	8
Tainan TSG GhostHawks	28	7	21	.250	12

Defeated the 3rd seed Kaohsiung Aquas, 3–0
Semifinals
Defeated the 1st seed New Taipei CTBC DEA, 3–2

=== Regular season series ===
The Leopards won 4–3 in the regular-season series.

November 19, 2023

boxscore

Taipei Mars	99–**102**	**Taiwan Beer Leopards**

Taoyuan Arena, Taoyuan City

December 2, 2023

boxscore

**Taipei Mars**	**111**–104	Taiwan Beer Leopards

Taoyuan Arena, Taoyuan City

December 24, 2023

boxscore

**Taiwan Beer Leopards**	**109**–102	Taipei Mars

Taipei Heping Basketball Gymnasium, Taipei City

December 31, 2023

boxscore

**Taiwan Beer Leopards**	**120**–113	Taipei Mars

Taipei Heping Basketball Gymnasium, Taipei City

March 24, 2024

boxscore

Taiwan Beer Leopards	96–**126**	**Taipei Mars**

Taipei Heping Basketball Gymnasium, Taipei City

April 20, 2024

boxscore

Taipei Mars	96–**101**	**Taiwan Beer Leopards**

Taoyuan Arena, Taoyuan City

April 21, 2024

boxscore

**Taipei Mars**	**91**–79	Taiwan Beer Leopards

Taoyuan Arena, Taoyuan City

== Series summary ==
Game	Date	Away team	Result	Home team
Game 1	May 24	Taipei Mars	101–**106** (0–1)	**Taiwan Beer Leopards**
Game 2	May 26	Taipei Mars	107–**112** (0–2)	**Taiwan Beer Leopards**
Game 3	May 30	**Taiwan Beer Leopards**	**94**–79 (3–0)	Taipei Mars
Game 4	June 1	**Taiwan Beer Leopards**	**108**–80 (4–0)	Taipei Mars

== Game summaries ==
=== Game 1 ===
VL Sports
ELTA TV

May 24, 2024
19:00 (UTC+8)

boxscore

Taipei Mars	101–**106**	**Taiwan Beer Leopards**
Scoring by quarter: 25–**36**, **33**–19, 25–**28**, 18–**23**
Pts: Lin Ping-Sheng 25; Rebs: Koreniuk 12; Asts: Chen Wen-Hung, Ndoye 5		Pts: Cousins, Kromah 30; Rebs: Cousins 15; Asts: Kromah 7
**Leopards leads series, 1–0**

Taoyuan Arena, Taoyuan City
Attendance: 5,019
Referees: Ho Chang-Jen, Lai Chien-Hao, Huang Po-Wei

=== Game 2 ===
VL Sports
ELTA TV

May 26, 2024
14:00 (UTC+8)

boxscore

Taipei Mars	107–**112**	**Taiwan Beer Leopards**
Scoring by quarter: **32**–19, 22–**30**, 20–**26**, 33–**37**
Pts: Lin Ping-Sheng 38; Rebs: Johnson 15; Asts: Lin Ping-Sheng 8		Pts: Gao Jin-Wei, Cousins 27; Rebs: Cousins 12; Asts: Chiang Yu-An, Kromah 4
**Leopards leads series, 2–0**

Taoyuan Arena, Taoyuan City
Attendance: 6,869
Referees: Yu Jung, Lan Wei-Hsiung, Hsieh Shang-Chien

=== Game 3 ===
VL Sports
ELTA TV

May 30, 2024
19:00 (UTC+8)

boxscore

**Taiwan Beer Leopards**	**94**–79	Taipei Mars
Scoring by quarter: **33**–18, 19–**20**, **26**–16, 16–**25**
Pts: Chiang Yu-An, Kromah 21; Rebs: Cousins 15; Asts: Kromah 7		Pts: Lin Ping-Sheng 24; Rebs: Johnson 12; Asts: Johnson 7
**Leopards leads series, 3–0**

Taipei Heping Basketball Gymnasium, Taipei City
Attendance: 3,754
Referees: Lin Chien-Hung, Chuang Chih-Chun, Lai Chien-Hao

=== Game 4 ===
VL Sports
ELTA TV

June 1, 2024
14:00 (UTC+8)

boxscore

**Taiwan Beer Leopards**	**108**–80	Taipei Mars
Scoring by quarter: **27**–26, **28**–17, 20–**23**, **33**–14
Pts: Kromah 36; Rebs: Cousins 24; Asts: Gao Jin-Wei 7		Pts: Johnson 30; Rebs: Johnson 14; Asts: Johnson, Tsao Xun-Xiang 5
**Leopards wins T1 League finals, 4–0**

Taipei Heping Basketball Gymnasium, Taipei City
Attendance: 5,000
Referees: Yu Jung, Ho Chang-Jen, Hsieh Shang-Chien

== Rosters ==
=== Taiwan Beer Leopards ===
2023–24 Taiwan Beer Leopards roster
Players
Coaches

Pos.	No.	Nat.	Name	Ht.	Wt.	Age	From
G	0	(Taiwan)	Chen Hsiao-Jung	1.80 m (5 ft 11 in)	70 kg (154 lb)	24 – 6 November 1999	NTUST
PG	1	(Taiwan)	Cheng Wei **(C)**	1.80 m (5 ft 11 in)	90 kg (198 lb)	33 – 8 January 1991	USC
G	5	(Taiwan)	Gao Jin-Wei	1.77 m (5 ft 10 in)	66 kg (146 lb)	23 – 23 October 2000	UCH
SG	7	(Taiwan)	Lu Chieh-Min	1.84 m (6 ft 0 in)	88 kg (194 lb)	28 – 12 October 1995	FJU
SF	10	(Taiwan)	Chu I-Tsung	1.86 m (6 ft 1 in)	85 kg (187 lb)	37 – 4 August 1986	HWU
F	12	(Taiwan)	Lin Sin-Kuan	1.92 m (6 ft 4 in)	97 kg (214 lb)	22 – 9 May 2002	NTNU
F	13	(United States)	DeAndre Williams **(I)**	2.06 m (6 ft 9 in)	93 kg (205 lb)	27 – 4 October 1996	Memphis
PG	14	(Taiwan)	Chiang Yu-An	1.74 m (5 ft 9 in)	65 kg (143 lb)	32 – 4 August 1991	NTUS
C	15	(United States)	DeMarcus Cousins **(I)**	2.08 m (6 ft 10 in)	122 kg (269 lb)	33 – 13 August 1990	Kentucky
SF	24	(Liberia) (United States)	Lasan Kromah **(I)**	1.98 m (6 ft 6 in)	91 kg (201 lb)	32 – 24 June 1991	UConn
SG	27	(Taiwan)	Huang Jhen	1.93 m (6 ft 4 in)	86 kg (190 lb)	33 – 27 June 1990	FJU
C	32	(Taiwan)	Wu Pei-Chia	2.05 m (6 ft 9 in)	100 kg (220 lb)	24 – 27 September 1999	SHU
PF	41	(United States)	Devin Williams **(I)**	2.06 m (6 ft 9 in)	122 kg (269 lb)	30 – 31 May 1994	West Virginia
SG	75	(Taiwan)	Lee Chi-Wei	1.92 m (6 ft 4 in)	87 kg (192 lb)	31 – 8 April 1993	MDU
C	82	(Taiwan)	Liu Yuan-Kai	2.06 m (6 ft 9 in)	105 kg (231 lb)	32 – 9 July 1991	FJU

Head coach

- (Canada) Charles Dubé-Brais

Assistant coach(es)

- (Philippines) (Canada) Jeffrey Dosado
- (Taiwan) Liu Wen-He

Strength & conditioning coach(es)

- (Taiwan) Chen Tzu-Yi
- (Taiwan) Chen Ting-Wei

Athletic trainer(s)

- (Taiwan) Chen Wei-Chih
- (Taiwan) Cheng Po-Wei

Legend

- **(C)** Team captain
- **(I)** Import player
- Injured

- Roster
Updated: May 10, 2024

=== Taipei Mars ===
2023–24 Taipei Mars roster
Players
Coaches

Pos.	No.	Nat.	Name	Ht.	Wt.	Age	From
SG	0	(Taiwan)	Lin Ping-Sheng	1.84 m (6 ft 0 in)	77 kg (170 lb)	27 – 26 December 1996	CCU
PG	3	(Taiwan)	Ting Sheng-Ju	1.74 m (5 ft 9 in)	75 kg (165 lb)	25 – 22 August 1998	St. Francis
PG	5	(Taiwan)	Lin Li	1.83 m (6 ft 0 in)	81 kg (179 lb)	22 – 20 June 2001	NCCU
PF	7	(Taiwan)	Liu Yen-Ting	1.96 m (6 ft 5 in)	96 kg (212 lb)	24 – 17 January 2000	OCU
SF	8	(Taiwan)	Chen Wen-Hung	1.88 m (6 ft 2 in)	98 kg (216 lb)	32 – 14 July 1991	NTSU
PF	9	(Taiwan)	Chang Chao-Chen	1.96 m (6 ft 5 in)	97 kg (214 lb)	23 – 2 September 2000	NTNU
C	10	(United States)	Jaylen Johnson **(I)**	2.06 m (6 ft 9 in)	104 kg (229 lb)	27 – 7 August 1996	Louisville
SF	11	(Taiwan)	Huang Tsung-Han	1.93 m (6 ft 4 in)	96 kg (212 lb)	29 – 7 July 1994	MDU
PF	12	(Taiwan)	Lin Yi-Huei **(C)**	1.92 m (6 ft 4 in)	100 kg (220 lb)	38 – 24 March 1986	NTNU
F	15	(United States)	Rahlir Hollis-Jefferson **(I)**	1.98 m (6 ft 6 in)	98 kg (216 lb)	32 – 26 June 1991	Temple
C	20	(Taiwan)	Sun Szu-Yao	2.03 m (6 ft 8 in)	105 kg (231 lb)	26 – 3 October 1997	NYIT
SG	24	(Taiwan)	Hsu Ching-En	1.90 m (6 ft 3 in)	90 kg (198 lb)	22 – 11 July 2001	NTNU
SG	29	(Taiwan)	Chang Keng-Yu	1.88 m (6 ft 2 in)	88 kg (194 lb)	28 – 16 October 1995	NTUS
C	30	(Ukraine)	Vladyslav Koreniuk **(I)**	2.10 m (6 ft 11 in)	123 kg (271 lb)	30 – 8 January 1994	Ukraine
C	35	(Senegal)	Youssou Ndoye **(I)**	2.13 m (7 ft 0 in)	113 kg (249 lb)	32 – 15 July 1991	St. Bonaventure
SG	57	(Taiwan)	Tsao Xun-Xiang	1.81 m (5 ft 11 in)	81 kg (179 lb)	25 – 16 March 1999	NTUA

Head coach

- (Taiwan) Hsu Hao-Cheng (interim)

Assistant coach(es)

- (Taiwan) Peng Te-Hsuan
- (Taiwan) Ni Hsueh-Chien
- (Serbia) Milan Stevanovic

Strength & conditioning coach(es)

- (Taiwan) Chen Hung-Lin
- (Taiwan) Chiang Cheng-Han

Athletic trainer(s)

- (Taiwan) Chien Shao-Fu
- (Taiwan) Guan Yen-Lin

Team manager

- (Taiwan) Lin You-Ting

Legend

- **(C)** Team captain
- **(I)** Import player
- Injured

- Roster
Updated: May 5, 2024

== Player statistics ==
Legend
GP	Games played	MPG	Minutes per game	FG%	Field goal percentage
3P%	3-point field goal percentage	FT%	Free throw percentage	RPG	Rebounds per game
APG	Assists per game	SPG	Steals per game	BPG	Blocks per game
PPG	Points per game		Finals MVP

=== Taiwan Beer Leopards ===
Player	GP	MPG	PPG	FG%	3P%	FT%	RPG	APG	SPG	BPG
Chen Hsiao-Jung	2	3:08	1.5	0.0%	0.0%	75.0%	0.5	0.0	0.0	0.0
Cheng Wei	2	2:15	0.5	0.0%	0.0%	50.0%	1.0	0.0	0.0	0.0
Gao Jin-Wei	4	35:11	16.8	49.0%	33.3%	91.7%	4.5	3.5	2.0	0.0
Lu Chieh-Min	2	1:45	0.0	0.0%	0.0%	0.0%	0.5	0.0	0.0	0.0
Chu I-Tsung	1	3:41	2.0	50.0%	0.0%	0.0%	1.0	0.0	0.0	0.0
Lin Sin-Kuan	4	27:30	5.0	36.4%	30.8%	0.0%	4.3	0.5	0.0	0.0
DeAndre Williams	1	9:46	2.0	0.0%	0.0%	100.0%	4.0	0.0	0.0	2.0
Chiang Yu-An	3	39:42	17.0	50.0%	45.0%	50.0%	4.0	4.0	1.7	0.0
DeMarcus Cousins	4	35:39	25.3	45.0%	20.0%	85.7%	16.5	2.0	1.8	1.8
Lasan Kromah	4	39:32	25.5	47.6%	44.0%	64.7%	4.5	5.8	3.5	0.5
Huang Jhen	4	8:05	3.0	30.8%	36.4%	0.0%	1.8	0.8	0.0	0.5
Wu Pei-Chia	Did not play									
Devin Williams	3	20:48	6.3	32.0%	0.0%	75.0%	6.3	1.3	0.7	0.3
Lee Chi-Wei	4	36:15	9.3	56.5%	52.6%	50.0%	2.3	1.5	0.8	0.5
Liu Yuan-Kai	4	5:25	0.8	50.0%	0.0%	50.0%	1.3	0.0	0.0	0.0

=== Taipei Mars ===
Player	GP	MPG	PPG	FG%	3P%	FT%	RPG	APG	SPG	BPG
Lin Ping-Sheng	4	36:03	25.0	48.1%	35.7%	70.0%	4.8	4.5	2.8	0.3
Ting Sheng-Ju	3	12:04	0.3	0.0%	0.0%	50.0%	2.7	2.0	0.0	0.0
Lin Li	2	2:10	0.0	0.0%	0.0%	0.0%	0.5	0.5	0.0	0.0
Liu Yen-Ting	1	2:30	0.0	0.0%	0.0%	0.0%	0.0	0.0	0.0	0.0
Chen Wen-Hung	4	25:50	5.5	29.2%	27.8%	75.0%	3.0	2.3	0.5	0.5
Chang Chao-Chen	2	1:45	1.0	33.3%	0.0%	0.0%	1.0	0.0	0.0	0.0
Jaylen Johnson	4	43:01	19.0	43.3%	30.0%	63.2%	13.0	4.8	2.0	0.8
Huang Tsung-Han	4	23:49	7.8	29.4%	32.0%	100.0%	1.8	0.3	1.5	0.0
Lin Yi-Huei	3	19:10	6.7	38.9%	27.3%	60.0%	3.0	1.0	1.0	0.0
Rahlir Hollis-Jefferson	Did not play									
Sun Szu-Yao	2	3:11	0.0	0.0%	0.0%	0.0%	1.5	0.0	0.0	0.5
Hsu Ching-En	Did not play									
Chang Keng-Yu	2	22:58	6.5	60.0%	33.3%	0.0%	3.0	0.0	0.5	0.0
Vladyslav Koreniuk	3	14:36	6.0	53.8%	0.0%	66.7%	4.7	0.7	0.0	0.7
Youssou Ndoye	3	32:03	15.0	55.2%	0.0%	76.5%	8.3	2.3	0.0	0.3
Tsao Xun-Xiang	4	37:10	9.8	34.8%	30.0%	50.0%	4.3	3.8	1.5	0.3

- Reference：
