= 2024 T1 League playoffs =

Taiwanese basketball tournament

Tournament details
- Dates: May 4 – June 1, 2024
- Season: 2023–24
- Teams: 4

Final positions
- Champions: Taiwan Beer Leopards (1st title)
- Runners-up: Taipei Mars
- Semifinalists: New Taipei CTBC DEA; Kaohsiung Aquas

The 2024 T1 League playoffs was the postseason tournament of the T1 League's 2023–24 season. The semifinals series started on May 4 and ended on May 14. The finals series started on May 24 and ended on June 1. On June 1, the Taiwan Beer Leopards defeated the Taipei Mars, 4–0, winning the 2023–24 season championship.

== Format ==
Four teams participated in the playoffs. The top four seeds, based on winning percentage of regular season, played the best-of-five semifinals series, which was in a 2-2-1 format. The winners of the semifinals series played the best-of-seven finals series, which was in a 2-2-1-1-1 format.

== Playoff qualifying ==
On March 16, 2024, the New Taipei CTBC DEA became the first team to clinch the semifinals series. On April 20, the Taipei Mars became the final team to clinch the semifinals series, qualifying as the fourth seed. On April 27, the New Taipei CTBC DEA clinched the regular season title.

Seed	Team	Record	Clinched	
Seed	Team	Record	Semifinals berth	Best record in T1
1	New Taipei CTBC DEA	19–9	March 16	April 27
2	Taiwan Beer Leopards	18–10	April 4	—
3	Kaohsiung Aquas	15–13	March 31	—
4	Taipei Mars	11–17	April 20	—

== Bracket ==
Semifinals
1	New Taipei CTBC DEA	2
4	**Taipei Mars**	**3**
2	**Taiwan Beer Leopards**	**3**
3	Kaohsiung Aquas	0

Finals
4	Taipei Mars	0
2	**Taiwan Beer Leopards**	**4**

Bold: Series winner
Italic: Team with home-court advantage

== Semifinals ==
=== (1) New Taipei CTBC DEA vs. (4) Taipei Mars ===
VL Sports
ELTA TV

May 4, 2024
14:00 (UTC+8)

boxscore

**Taipei Mars**	**95**–94 (OT)	New Taipei CTBC DEA
Scoring by quarter: **35**–12, 19–**27**, 18–**26**, 15–**22**, Overtime: **8**–7
Pts: Johnson 23; Rebs: Johnson 16; Asts: Koreniuk, Johnson 5		Pts: Želionis 28; Rebs: Želionis 15; Asts: Hsieh Ya-Hsuan 8
**Mars leads series, 1–0**

Xinzhuang Gymnasium, New Taipei City
Attendance: 3,183
Referees: Yu Jung, Lin Chien-Hung, Hsieh Shang-Chien

VL Sports
ELTA TV

May 6, 2024
19:00 (UTC+8)

boxscore

Taipei Mars	88–**95**	**New Taipei CTBC DEA**
Scoring by quarter: **26**–20, **21**–18, 26–**34**, 15–**23**
Pts: Lin Ping-Sheng 30; Rebs: Ndoye 14; Asts: Ndoye 6		Pts: Želionis 32; Rebs: Želionis, Demps 11; Asts: Lin Wei-Han 13
**Series tied, 1–1**

Xinzhuang Gymnasium, New Taipei City
Attendance: 5,057
Referees: Chuang Chih-Chun, Chen Chien-Lin, Chien Chun-Yen

VL Sports
ELTA TV

May 9, 2024
19:00 (UTC+8)

boxscore

New Taipei CTBC DEA	72–**80**	**Taipei Mars**
Scoring by quarter: **20**–18, **23**–10, 12–**26**, 17–**26**
Pts: Bachir 23; Rebs: Demps 11; Asts: Krajina, Lin Wei-Han 4		Pts: Lin Ping-Sheng 24; Rebs: Ndoye 17; Asts: Tsao Xun-Xiang 9
**Mars leads series, 2–1**

National Taiwan University Sports Center, Taipei City
Attendance: 3,326
Referees: Yu Jung, Lai Chien-Hao, Hsieh Chieh-Lung

VL Sports
ELTA TV

May 11, 2024
19:00 (UTC+8)

boxscore

**New Taipei CTBC DEA**	**81**–71	Taipei Mars
Scoring by quarter: 19–**20**, **21**–16, **23**–18, **18**–17
Pts: Želionis 27; Rebs: Želionis 16; Asts: Bachir 6		Pts: Ndoye 25; Rebs: Ndoye 13; Asts: Johnson 5
**Series tied, 2–2**

National Taiwan University Sports Center, Taipei City
Attendance: 3,775
Referees: Lin Chien-Hung, Chen Chien-Lin, Hsieh Shang-Chien

VL Sports
ELTA TV

May 14, 2024
19:00 (UTC+8)

boxscore

**Taipei Mars**	**97**–91	New Taipei CTBC DEA
Scoring by quarter: 22–**30**, 20–**22**, **32**–17, **23**–22
Pts: Ndoye 34; Rebs: Ndoye 16; Asts: Lin Ping-Sheng 7		Pts: Bachir, Demps 25; Rebs: Demps 12; Asts: Tseng Wen-Ting 7
**Mars wins series, 3–2**

Xinzhuang Gymnasium, New Taipei City
Attendance: 5,650
Referees: Yu Jung, Ho Chang-Jen, Lai Chien-Hao

Regular-season series
The DEA won 6–1 in the regular-season series

November 25, 2023

boxscore

**New Taipei CTBC DEA**	**104**–79	Taipei Mars

Taipei Heping Basketball Gymnasium, Taipei City

December 10, 2023

boxscore

Taipei Mars	85–**86**	**New Taipei CTBC DEA**

Xinzhuang Gymnasium, New Taipei City

January 7, 2024

boxscore

**New Taipei CTBC DEA**	**105**–91	Taipei Mars

Taipei Heping Basketball Gymnasium, Taipei City

January 20, 2024

boxscore

**New Taipei CTBC DEA**	**94**–75	Taipei Mars

Taipei Heping Basketball Gymnasium, Taipei City

March 2, 2024

boxscore

Taipei Mars	83–**87**	**New Taipei CTBC DEA**

Xinzhuang Gymnasium, New Taipei City

April 13, 2024

boxscore

Taipei Mars	81–**88**	**New Taipei CTBC DEA**

Taipei Dome, Taipei City

April 14, 2024

boxscore

**Taipei Mars**	**114**–76	New Taipei CTBC DEA

Taipei Dome, Taipei City

This was the first playoff meeting between these two teams.

=== (2) Taiwan Beer Leopards vs. (3) Kaohsiung Aquas ===
VL Sports
ELTA TV

May 5, 2024
14:00 (UTC+8)

boxscore

Kaohsiung Aquas	76–**90**	**Taiwan Beer Leopards**
Scoring by quarter: 18–**20**, 14–**25**, **22**–21, 22–**24**
Pts: Kupšas 19; Rebs: Kupšas 12; Asts: Scott 7		Pts: Cousins 22; Rebs: Cousins 15; Asts: Cousins 6
**Leopards leads series, 1–0**

Taoyuan Arena, Taoyuan City
Attendance: 5,515
Referees: Ho Chang-Jen, Lai Chien-Hao, Huang Po-Wei

VL Sports
ELTA TV

May 7, 2024
19:00 (UTC+8)

boxscore

Kaohsiung Aquas	98–**107**	**Taiwan Beer Leopards**
Scoring by quarter: 23–**37**, 19–**20**, **24**–23, **32**–27
Pts: Hu Long-Mao 28; Rebs: Kupšas 13; Asts: Scott 6		Pts: Kromah 30; Rebs: Williams 12; Asts: Kromah 5
**Leopards leads series, 2–0**

Taoyuan Arena, Taoyuan City
Attendance: 2,758
Referees: Lan Wei-Hsiung, Lin Chien-Hung, Hou Chun-Jen

VL Sports
ELTA TV

May 10, 2024
19:00 (UTC+8)

boxscore

**Taiwan Beer Leopards**	**113**–111 (OT)	Kaohsiung Aquas
Scoring by quarter: 22–**38**, **28**–18, 21–21, **30**–24, Overtime: **12**–10
Pts: Cousins 37; Rebs: Cousins 18; Asts: Cousins 5		Pts: Scott 24; Rebs: Geramipoor 14; Asts: Scott 11
**Leopards wins series, 3–0**

Fengshan Arena, Kaohsiung City
Attendance: 4,123
Referees: Yu Jung, Lan Wei-Hsiung, Hsieh Shang-Chien

Regular-season series
The Leopards won 4–3 in the regular-season series

November 25, 2023

boxscore

Kaohsiung Aquas	95–**110**	**Taiwan Beer Leopards**

Taoyuan Arena, Taoyuan City

December 9, 2023

boxscore

Taiwan Beer Leopards	104–**122**	**Kaohsiung Aquas**

Kaohsiung Arena, Kaohsiung City

January 6, 2024

boxscore

**Taiwan Beer Leopards**	**103**–99	Kaohsiung Aquas

Kaohsiung Arena, Kaohsiung City

January 27, 2024

boxscore

**Kaohsiung Aquas**	**108**–101	Taiwan Beer Leopards

Taoyuan Arena, Taoyuan City

February 18, 2024

boxscore

Taiwan Beer Leopards	117–**118**	**Kaohsiung Aquas**

Kaohsiung Arena, Kaohsiung City

April 13, 2024

boxscore

Kaohsiung Aquas	78–**117**	**Taiwan Beer Leopards**

Taoyuan Arena, Taoyuan City

April 28, 2024

boxscore

**Taiwan Beer Leopards**	**113**–109	Kaohsiung Aquas

Fengshan Arena, Kaohsiung City

This was the first playoff meeting between these two teams.

== T1 League finals: (2) Taiwan Beer Leopards vs. (4) Taipei Mars ==
VL Sports
ELTA TV

May 24, 2024
19:00 (UTC+8)

boxscore

Taipei Mars	101–**106**	**Taiwan Beer Leopards**
Scoring by quarter: 25–**36**, **33**–19, 25–**28**, 18–**23**
Pts: Lin Ping-Sheng 25; Rebs: Koreniuk 12; Asts: Chen Wen-Hung, Ndoye 5		Pts: Cousins, Kromah 30; Rebs: Cousins 15; Asts: Kromah 7
**Leopards leads series, 1–0**

Taoyuan Arena, Taoyuan City
Attendance: 5,019
Referees: Ho Chang-Jen, Lai Chien-Hao, Huang Po-Wei

VL Sports
ELTA TV

May 26, 2024
14:00 (UTC+8)

boxscore

Taipei Mars	107–**112**	**Taiwan Beer Leopards**
Scoring by quarter: **32**–19, 22–**30**, 20–**26**, 33–**37**
Pts: Lin Ping-Sheng 38; Rebs: Johnson 15; Asts: Lin Ping-Sheng 8		Pts: Gao Jin-Wei, Cousins 27; Rebs: Cousins 12; Asts: Chiang Yu-An, Kromah 4
**Leopards leads series, 2–0**

Taoyuan Arena, Taoyuan City
Attendance: 6,869
Referees: Yu Jung, Lan Wei-Hsiung, Hsieh Shang-Chien

VL Sports
ELTA TV

May 30, 2024
19:00 (UTC+8)

boxscore

**Taiwan Beer Leopards**	**94**–79	Taipei Mars
Scoring by quarter: **33**–18, 19–**20**, **26**–16, 16–**25**
Pts: Chiang Yu-An, Kromah 21; Rebs: Cousins 15; Asts: Kromah 7		Pts: Lin Ping-Sheng 24; Rebs: Johnson 12; Asts: Johnson 7
**Leopards leads series, 3–0**

Taipei Heping Basketball Gymnasium, Taipei City
Attendance: 3,754
Referees: Lin Chien-Hung, Chuang Chih-Chun, Lai Chien-Hao

VL Sports
ELTA TV

June 1, 2024
14:00 (UTC+8)

boxscore

**Taiwan Beer Leopards**	**108**–80	Taipei Mars
Scoring by quarter: **27**–26, **28**–17, 20–**23**, **33**–14
Pts: Kromah 36; Rebs: Cousins 24; Asts: Gao Jin-Wei 7		Pts: Johnson 30; Rebs: Johnson 14; Asts: Johnson, Tsao Xun-Xiang 5
**Leopards wins series, 4–0**

Taipei Heping Basketball Gymnasium, Taipei City
Attendance: 5,000
Referees: Yu Jung, Ho Chang-Jen, Hsieh Shang-Chien

Regular-season series
The Leopards won 4–3 in the regular-season series

November 19, 2023

boxscore

Taipei Mars	99–**102**	**Taiwan Beer Leopards**

Taoyuan Arena, Taoyuan City

December 2, 2023

boxscore

**Taipei Mars**	**111**–104	Taiwan Beer Leopards

Taoyuan Arena, Taoyuan City

December 24, 2023

boxscore

**Taiwan Beer Leopards**	**109**–102	Taipei Mars

Taipei Heping Basketball Gymnasium, Taipei City

December 31, 2023

boxscore

**Taiwan Beer Leopards**	**120**–113	Taipei Mars

Taipei Heping Basketball Gymnasium, Taipei City

March 24, 2024

boxscore

Taiwan Beer Leopards	96–**126**	**Taipei Mars**

Taipei Heping Basketball Gymnasium, Taipei City

April 20, 2024

boxscore

Taipei Mars	96–**101**	**Taiwan Beer Leopards**

Taoyuan Arena, Taoyuan City

April 21, 2024

boxscore

**Taipei Mars**	**91**–79	Taiwan Beer Leopards

Taoyuan Arena, Taoyuan City

This was the first playoff meeting between these two teams.

== Statistical leaders ==
Category	Game high			Average			
Category	Player	Team	High	Player	Team	Avg.	GP
Points	Lin Ping-Sheng	Taipei Mars	38	Lasan Kromah	Taiwan Beer Leopards	25.6	7
Rebounds	DeMarcus Cousins	Taiwan Beer Leopards	24	DeMarcus Cousins	Taiwan Beer Leopards	15.4	7
Assists	Lin Wei-Han	New Taipei CTBC DEA	13	Shannon Scott	Kaohsiung Aquas	8.0	3
Steals	Lasan Kromah	Taiwan Beer Leopards	8	Lasan Kromah	Taiwan Beer Leopards	4.4	7
Blocks	Jaylen Johnson	Taipei Mars	4	Perry Jones	Kaohsiung Aquas	3.0	1
