= List of Taipei Taishin Mars head coaches =

The Taipei Taishin Mars are a Taiwanese professional basketball team based in Taipei City, Taiwan. The team was formerly known as the Taipei Mars from 2023 to 2024. The team is owned by TS Financial Holdings and coached by Gianluca Tucci, with Lin You-Ting as the general manager. The Mars won 0 T1 League championship and 0 Taiwan Professional Basketball League championship since the team was founded in 2023.

There have been 4 head coaches for the Taipei Taishin Mars franchise and haven't won any T1 League and Taiwan Professional Basketball League championship.

== Key ==
GC	Games coached
W	Wins
L	Losses
Win%	Winning percentage
#	Number of coaches

== Coaches ==
Note: Statistics are correct through the end of the 2025–26 TPBL season.

#	Name	Term	GC	W	L	Win%	GC	W	L	Win%	Achievements
#	Name	Term	Regular season				Playoffs				Achievements
Taipei Mars
1	Brian Adams	2023	10	2	8	.200	–	–	–	–	
2	Hsu Hao-Cheng	2024	18	9	9	.500	9	3	6	.333	
Taipei Taishin Mars
—	Hsu Hao-Cheng	2024–2026	63	25	38	.397	6	1	5	.167	
3	Milan Stevanovic	2026	9	2	7	.222	–	–	–	–	
4	Gianluca Tucci	2026–present	0	0	0	–	–	–	–	–	
