= 2023–24 Tainan TSG GhostHawks season =

Taiwanese professional basketball season

- President: Wang Chiung-Fen
- General Manager: Chien Wei-Cheng
- Head Coach: Liu Meng-Chu (resigned); Lin Yu-Cheng (interim); Raoul Korner
- Arena: Chia Nan University of Pharmacy and Science Shao Tsung Gymnasium

T1 League results
- Record: 7–21 (25.0%)
- Place: 5th
- Playoffs finish: Did not qualify

Player records
- Points: Nick King 24.2
- Rebounds: Nick King 10.3
- Assists: Nick King 5.7

The 2023–24 Tainan TSG GhostHawks season was the franchise's third season, its third season in the T1 League.

The GhostHawks were coached by Liu Meng-Chu in his third year as their head coach. On January 9, 2024, the GhostHawks announced that Liu Meng-Chu resigned from head coach, and named Lin Yu-Cheng, the assistant coach of the Tainan TSG GhostHawks, as their interim head coach. On January 29, the GhostHawks hired Raoul Korner as their new head coach.

== Draft ==
The GhostHawks did not select any players in the 2023 T1 League draft.

== Roster ==
2023–24 Tainan TSG GhostHawks roster
Players
Coaches

Pos.	No.	Nat.	Name	Ht.	Wt.	Age	From
SG	2	(Taiwan)	Chien Wei-Ju	1.86 m (6 ft 1 in)	85 kg (187 lb)	32 – 20 January 1992	NTNU
PG	3	(Taiwan)	Ku Mao Wei-Chia	1.75 m (5 ft 9 in)	68 kg (150 lb)	24 – 4 December 1999	UCH
PG	4	(Taiwan)	Li Han-Sheng	1.77 m (5 ft 10 in)	76 kg (168 lb)	29 – 24 October 1994	NTNU
F	5	(United States)	Nick King (I)	2.03 m (6 ft 8 in)	102 kg (225 lb)	28 – 5 August 1995	Middle Tennessee
PG	6	(Mongolia)	Delgerchuluun Bayasgalan (SFS)	1.83 m (6 ft 0 in)	75 kg (165 lb)	26 – 30 October 1997	HDUT
SF	12	(Taiwan)	Hu Kai-Hsiang	1.90 m (6 ft 3 in)	93 kg (205 lb)	32 – 16 May 1991	CCU
PF	17	(Croatia)	Domagoj Vuković (I)	2.08 m (6 ft 10 in)	100 kg (220 lb)	30 – 29 October 1993	Croatia
C	18	(Taiwan)	Wu Hung-Hsing	2.02 m (6 ft 8 in)	96 kg (212 lb)	34 – 21 October 1989	SRHS
F	21	(Taiwan)	Lu Kuan-Ting	1.97 m (6 ft 6 in)	100 kg (220 lb)	31 – 13 October 1992	NTUA
F	24	(Taiwan)	Kuo Shao-Chieh	1.90 m (6 ft 3 in)	84 kg (185 lb)	34 – 9 April 1990	TNU
F	29	(Taiwan)	Han Chieh-Yu	1.94 m (6 ft 4 in)	95 kg (209 lb)	24 – 17 December 1999	NTSU
PF	41	(Taiwan)	Su Yi-Chin	1.96 m (6 ft 5 in)	105 kg (231 lb)	30 – 29 December 1993	MDU
C	51	(Montenegro) (Serbia)	Milko Bjelica (I)	2.08 m (6 ft 10 in)	113 kg (249 lb)	39 – 4 June 1984	Serbia
C	55	(Lithuania)	Egidijus Mockevičius (I)	2.08 m (6 ft 10 in)	108 kg (238 lb)	31 – 1 September 1992	Evansville
G	68	(Taiwan)	Chang Po-Sheng	1.85 m (6 ft 1 in)	82 kg (181 lb)	37 – 2 February 1987	NTUA
G	72	(Taiwan)	Lu Chi-Erh (C)	1.87 m (6 ft 2 in)	80 kg (176 lb)	32 – 15 January 1992	NKNU

Head coach

- (Austria) Raoul Korner

Assistant coach(es)

- (Taiwan) Lin Yu-Cheng
- (Republic of Ireland) Sean Kilmartin

Strength & conditioning coach(es)

- (Taiwan) Kuo Han-Po

Athletic trainer(s)

- (Taiwan) Lin Te-Min

Physiotherapist(s)

- (Taiwan) Kuei Shan-Yu

Team manager

- (Taiwan) Chien Wei-Cheng

Legend

- (C) Team captain
- (I) Import player
- (SFS) Special foreign student
- Injured

- Roster
Updated: March 15, 2024

== Preseason ==
=== Game log ===
2023 preseason game log
Total: 1–1 (home: 1–0; road: 0–1)
Preseason : 1–1 (home: 1–0; road: 0–1)

Game	Date	Team	Score	High points	High rebounds	High assists	Location Attendance	Record
1	October 13	@ DEA	L 108–114	Samuel Deguara (27)	Nick King (8); Samuel Deguara (8)	Li Han-Sheng (5); Nick King (5); Hu Kai-Hsiang (5)	Xinzhuang Gymnasium; 753	0–1
2	October 14	Mars	W 100–91	Samuel Deguara (45)	Samuel Deguara (25)	Nick King (9); Hu Kai-Hsiang (9)	Xinzhuang Gymnasium; 2,876	1–1

Color： Win Lose
Schedule

== Regular season ==
=== Standings ===
Pos	Team	Pld	W	L	PCT	GB	Qualification
1	New Taipei CTBC DEA	28	19	9	.679	—	Advance to semifinals
2	Taiwan Beer Leopards	28	18	10	.643	1	Advance to semifinals
3	Kaohsiung Aquas	28	15	13	.536	4	Advance to semifinals
4	Taipei Mars	28	11	17	.393	8	Advance to semifinals
5	Tainan TSG GhostHawks	28	7	21	.250	12	

Source: T1 League

=== Game log ===
2023–24 regular season game log
Total: 7–21 (home: 6–8; road: 1–13)
October : 0–1 (home: 0–0; road: 0–1)

Game	Date	Team	Score	High points	High rebounds	High assists	Location Attendance	Record
1	October 28	@ DEA	L 92–106	Nick King (25)	Samuel Deguara (19)	Hu Kai-Hsiang (5)	Xinzhuang Gymnasium; 4,182	0–1

November : 0–1 (home: 0–0; road: 0–1)

Game	Date	Team	Score	High points	High rebounds	High assists	Location Attendance	Record
2	November 26	@ Leopards	L 112–120	Nick King (35)	Nick King (13)	Nick King (10)	Taoyuan Arena; 1,524	0–2

December : 3–4 (home: 2–2; road: 1–2)

Game	Date	Team	Score	High points	High rebounds	High assists	Location Attendance	Record
3	December 3	@ Aquas	W 98–89	Nick King (33)	Sim Bhullar (12)	Nick King (8)	Kaohsiung Arena; 6,237	1–2
4	December 9	@ DEA	L 85–88	Sim Bhullar (27)	Nick King (15)	Li Han-Sheng (4); Nick King (4)	Xinzhuang Gymnasium; 4,141	1–3
5	December 10	@ Aquas	L 82–110	Nick King (18)	Sim Bhullar (12)	Nick King (5)	Kaohsiung Arena; 5,634	1–4
6	December 16	Leopards	W 108–97	Nick King (23)	Nick King (13)	Nick King (11)	Chia Nan University of Pharmacy and Science Shao Tsung Gymnasium; 2,038	2–4
7	December 17	Mars	W 112–90	Nick King (38)	Nick King (9)	Nick King (10)	Chia Nan University of Pharmacy and Science Shao Tsung Gymnasium; 1,666	3–4
8	December 23	DEA	L 91–108	Nick King (24)	Nick King (14)	Ku Mao Wei-Chia (6)	Chia Nan University of Pharmacy and Science Shao Tsung Gymnasium; 1,314	3–5
9	December 24	Aquas	L 89–98	Samuel Deguara (19)	Sim Bhullar (17)	Sim Bhullar (4)	Chia Nan University of Pharmacy and Science Shao Tsung Gymnasium; 1,331	3–6

January : 0–5 (home: 0–0; road: 0–5)

Game	Date	Team	Score	High points	High rebounds	High assists	Location Attendance	Record
10	January 6	@ Mars	L 112–119	Nick King (31)	Nick King (16)	Li Han-Sheng (7)	Taipei Heping Basketball Gymnasium; 2,672	3–7
11	January 7	@ Aquas	L 111–120	Nick King (34)	Milko Bjelica (10)	Nick King (8)	Kaohsiung Arena; 5,816	3–8
12	January 20	@ Leopards	L 90–119	Samuel Deguara (15); Ku Mao Wei-Chia (15); Milko Bjelica (15)	Samuel Deguara (13)	Nick King (7); Ku Mao Wei-Chia (7)	Taoyuan Arena; 6,015	3–9
13	January 21	@ Mars	L 99–107	Nick King (26)	Nick King (15)	Nick King (8)	Taipei Heping Basketball Gymnasium; 3,509	3–10
14	January 28	@ Leopards	L 88–114	Nick King (22)	Nick King (14)	Nick King (9)	Taoyuan Arena; 6,125	3–11

February : 0–1 (home: 0–0; road: 0–1)

Game	Date	Team	Score	High points	High rebounds	High assists	Location Attendance	Record
15	February 24	@ Mars	L 89–96	Egidijus Mockevičius (20)	Egidijus Mockevičius (13)	Li Han-Sheng (9)	Taipei Heping Basketball Gymnasium; 4,280	3–12

March : 3–4 (home: 3–3; road: 0–1)

Game	Date	Team	Score	High points	High rebounds	High assists	Location Attendance	Record
16	March 2	Aquas	W 98–95	Nick King (34)	Egidijus Mockevičius (13)	Nick King (5)	Chia Nan University of Pharmacy and Science Shao Tsung Gymnasium; 1,688	4–12
17	March 3	Mars	L 90–92	Nick King (26)	Nick King (9); Milko Bjelica (9)	Ku Mao Wei-Chia (6)	Chia Nan University of Pharmacy and Science Shao Tsung Gymnasium; 1,664	4–13
18	March 9	@ DEA	L 73–85	Lu Kuan-Ting (15)	Domagoj Vuković (16)	Nick King (5)	Xinzhuang Gymnasium; 3,726	4–14
19	March 16	DEA	L 94–105	Nick King (21)	Domagoj Vuković (13)	Li Han-Sheng (5)	Chia Nan University of Pharmacy and Science Shao Tsung Gymnasium; 1,452	4–15
20	March 17	Leopards	W 108–93	Domagoj Vuković (22)	Egidijus Mockevičius (17)	Li Han-Sheng (7)	Chia Nan University of Pharmacy and Science Shao Tsung Gymnasium; 1,568	5–15
21	March 30	DEA	W 113–100	Nick King (31)	Egidijus Mockevičius (14)	Ku Mao Wei-Chia (6)	Chia Nan University of Pharmacy and Science Shao Tsung Gymnasium; 1,778	6–15
22	March 31	Aquas	L 92–99	Delgerchuluun Bayasgalan (26)	Egidijus Mockevičius (15)	Li Han-Sheng (7)	Chia Nan University of Pharmacy and Science Shao Tsung Gymnasium; 1,382	6–16

April : 1–5 (home: 1–3; road: 0–2)

Game	Date	Team	Score	High points	High rebounds	High assists	Location Attendance	Record
23	April 6	Mars	W 109–106 (OT)	Nick King (27)	Nick King (20)	Delgerchuluun Bayasgalan (6)	Chia Nan University of Pharmacy and Science Shao Tsung Gymnasium; 1,248	7–16
24	April 7	Leopards	L 85–105	Lu Kuan-Ting (18)	Domagoj Vuković (11)	Ku Mao Wei-Chia (8)	Chia Nan University of Pharmacy and Science Shao Tsung Gymnasium; 1,250	7–17
—	April 13	@ DEA	Rescheduled to March 9					
25	April 14	@ Leopards	L 121–125	Egidijus Mockevičius (25)	Egidijus Mockevičius (16)	Ku Mao Wei-Chia (15)	Taoyuan Arena; 2,519	7–18
26	April 20	DEA	L 88–91	Delgerchuluun Bayasgalan (17); Domagoj Vuković (17)	Egidijus Mockevičius (18)	Ku Mao Wei-Chia (7)	Chia Nan University of Pharmacy and Science Shao Tsung Gymnasium; 1,355	7–19
27	April 21	Aquas	L 78–86	Milko Bjelica (18); Domagoj Vuković (18)	Egidijus Mockevičius (16)	Li Han-Sheng (4)	Chia Nan University of Pharmacy and Science Shao Tsung Gymnasium; 1,799	7–20
28	April 28	@ Mars	L 70–97	Ku Mao Wei-Chia (13)	Egidijus Mockevičius (14)	Ku Mao Wei-Chia (3); Domagoj Vuković (3)	Taipei Heping Basketball Gymnasium; 4,861	7–21

Color： Win Lose Rescheduled
Schedule

=== Regular season note ===
- Due to the second home arena application of New Taipei CTBC DEA, the T1 League declared that the game on April 13 would be rescheduled to March 9.

== Player statistics ==
Legend
GP	Games played	MPG	Minutes per game	FG%	Field goal percentage
3P%	3-point field goal percentage	FT%	Free throw percentage	RPG	Rebounds per game
APG	Assists per game	SPG	Steals per game	BPG	Blocks per game
PPG	Points per game		Led the league

=== Regular season ===
Player	GP	MPG	PPG	FG%	3P%	FT%	RPG	APG	SPG	BPG
Chien Wei-Ju	23	16:35	4.5	30.3%	26.6%	91.7%	1.6	1.0	0.6	0.1
Ku Mao Wei-Chia	27	23:28	9.6	39.9%	31.3%	75.6%	1.5	3.7	1.0	0.0
Li Han-Sheng	27	25:15	8.3	41.2%	35.9%	79.4%	1.9	4.0	0.9	0.0
Nick King	22	41:15	24.2	45.6%	35.9%	74.8%	10.3	5.7	1.9	0.4
Delgerchuluun Bayasgalan	22	24:02	8.0	37.0%	26.7%	61.8%	2.0	2.0	0.7	0.0
Wu Yen-Lun^{‡}	1	1:23	0.0	0.0%	0.0%	0.0%	0.0	0.0	0.0	0.0
Hu Kai-Hsiang	15	13:05	3.1	40.9%	23.1%	83.3%	0.9	1.5	0.3	0.0
Samuel Deguara^{‡}	11	26:44	13.5	70.0%	0.0%	75.5%	9.7	0.6	0.5	1.7
Eric Griffin^{≠‡}	3	20:09	10.7	40.0%	33.3%	50.0%	4.7	2.0	0.7	1.0
Domagoj Vuković^{≠}	9	30:10	14.4	42.7%	23.5%	53.7%	10.1	2.4	1.9	1.2
Wu Hung-Hsing	10	5:24	1.0	35.7%	0.0%	0.0%	0.8	0.3	0.0	0.2
Lu Kuan-Ting	14	16:16	6.6	50.9%	46.7%	92.9%	1.5	1.2	0.7	0.0
Kao Cheng-En^{‡}	3	9:08	3.7	33.3%	25.0%	50.0%	1.0	1.7	0.3	0.0
Chen Ching-Huan^{‡}	1	19:48	6.0	50.0%	50.0%	0.0%	1.0	0.0	0.0	0.0
Kuo Shao-Chieh	24	17:48	6.1	34.7%	30.6%	85.0%	1.9	0.9	0.1	0.0
Lan Shao-Fu^{‡}	5	11:16	3.2	38.5%	28.6%	80.0%	2.0	0.6	0.2	0.2
Han Chieh-Yu	11	13:47	2.9	25.7%	26.1%	80.0%	2.0	0.7	0.5	0.1
Willie Reed^{≠‡}	1	13:25	7.0	60.0%	0.0%	100.0%	6.0	0.0	0.0	2.0
Sim Bhullar	8	29:46	13.9	67.6%	0.0%	52.8%	10.9	2.3	0.4	2.8
Su Yi-Chin	20	16:34	5.3	42.6%	26.8%	78.9%	2.4	1.6	0.5	0.2
Milko Bjelica^{≠}	15	26:23	13.5	40.9%	35.9%	64.5%	6.1	1.2	0.7	0.5
Wu Tai-Hao^{‡}	4	4:17	0.5	0.0%	0.0%	100.0%	0.5	0.0	0.0	0.0
Robert Upshaw^{‡}	1	12:40	0.0	0.0%	0.0%	0.0%	4.0	0.0	0.0	0.0
Egidijus Mockevičius^{≠}	12	33:55	13.8	51.4%	42.9%	77.1%	13.9	1.8	2.2	1.8
Chang Po-Sheng	11	5:42	2.3	53.8%	50.0%	100.0%	0.5	0.3	0.0	0.0
Lu Chi-Erh	24	14:20	3.8	33.0%	28.8%	60.0%	0.9	0.8	0.4	0.0

^{‡} Left during the season
^{≠} Acquired during the season

- Reference：

== Transactions ==
On March 9, 2024, the news reported that Tainan TSG GhostHawks had cancelled the registration of Sim Bhullar's playership.

=== Overview ===
Players added

Via free agency

- Delgerchuluun Bayasgalan
- Milko Bjelica
- Chang Po-Sheng
- Eric Griffin
- Kao Cheng-En
- Nick King
- Kuo Shao-Chieh
- Lan Shao-Fu
- Egidijus Mockevičius
- Willie Reed
- Su Yi-Chin
- Domagoj Vuković
Players lost

Via free agency

- Chang Wei-Hsiang
- Lin Tzu-Feng
- Liu Chun-Ting
- Tsai Chien-Yu
- Marcus Weathers

Waived

- Chen Ching-Huan
- Samuel Deguara
- Eric Griffin
- Willie Reed
- Robert Upshaw

Retirement

- Lung Hung-Yuan

Players communication to Yulon Luxgen Dinos

- Kao Cheng-En
- Lan Shao-Fu
- Wu Tai-Hao
- Wu Yen-Lun

=== Players communication to Yulon Luxgen Dinos ===
Date	Player	Ref.
January 4, 2024	Wu Tai-Hao	
January 4, 2024	Lan Shao-Fu	
January 4, 2024	Kao Cheng-En	
January 4, 2024	Wu Yen-Lun	

=== Free agency ===
==== Re-signed ====
Date	Player	Contract terms	Ref.
July 17, 2023	Wu Yen-Lun	—N/a	
July 24, 2023	Robert Upshaw	—N/a	
August 7, 2023	Sim Bhullar	—N/a	
August 28, 2023	Wu Tai-Hao	—N/a	
September 8, 2023	Samuel Deguara	—N/a	

==== Additions ====
Date	Player	Contract terms	Former team	Ref.
August 1, 2023	Chang Po-Sheng	—N/a	Bank of Taiwan	
August 5, 2023	Nick King	—N/a	(Taiwan) New Taipei CTBC DEA	
August 11, 2023	Kao Cheng-En	—N/a	(Taiwan) New Taipei Kings	
August 21, 2023	Kuo Shao-Chieh	—N/a	(Taiwan) Hsinchu JKO Lioneers	
October 18, 2023	Su Yi-Chin	—N/a	(Taiwan) Taichung Suns	
October 18, 2023	Lan Shao-Fu	—N/a	(Taiwan) Taichung Suns	
October 18, 2023	Delgerchuluun Bayasgalan	—N/a	(Taiwan) Taichung Suns	
November 22, 2023	Eric Griffin	—N/a	(Israel) Hapoel Eilat	
January 5, 2024	Milko Bjelica	—N/a	NSA Lebanon	
January 26, 2024	Willie Reed	—N/a	(Spain) Baloncesto Fuenlabrada	
February 21, 2024	Egidijus Mockevičius	—N/a	(Italy) Victoria Libertas Pesaro	
March 7, 2024	Domagoj Vuković	—N/a	(Croatia) Cibona	

==== Subtractions ====
Date	Player	Reason	New team	Ref.
April 16, 2023	Lung Hung-Yuan	Retirement	(Taiwan) NFU basketball team center coach	
May 31, 2023	Marcus Weathers	Contract expired	(United States) DuBois Dream	
June 14, 2023	Samuel Deguara	Contract expired	Hong Kong Bulls	
July 4, 2023	Robert Upshaw	Contract expired	(China) Shaanxi Wolves	
August 4, 2023	Lin Tzu-Feng	Contract expired	(Taiwan) Changhua BLL	
August 25, 2023	Chang Wei-Hsiang	Contract expired	(Taiwan) Changhua BLL	
October 6, 2023	Tsai Chien-Yu	Contract expired	—N/a	
October 11, 2023	Liu Chun-Ting	Career decision	(Japan) Aomori Wat's	
November 1, 2023	Chen Ching-Huan	Left the team due to suspected of gambling	—N/a	
November 20, 2023	Robert Upshaw	Contract terminated	(Turkey) Alagöz Holding Iğdır Basketbol	
December 30, 2023	Eric Griffin	Contract terminated	(Israel) Hapoel Haifa	
January 27, 2024	Samuel Deguara	Contract terminated	Taiwan Mustangs	
February 5, 2024	Willie Reed	Contract terminated	(Venezuela) Cocodrilos de Caracas	
