= 2023–24 Taipei Mars season =

Taiwanese professional basketball season

- President: Tiao Chien-Sheng
- General Manager: Lin You-Ting
- Head Coach: Brian Adams (resigned); Hsu Hao-Cheng (interim)
- Arena: Taipei Heping Basketball Gymnasium; Taipei Dome (co-home arena); National Taiwan University Sports Center

T1 League results
- Record: 11–17 (39.3%)
- Place: 4th
- Playoffs finish: Finals (lost to Leopards, 0–4)

Player records
- Points: Youssou Ndoye 18.8
- Rebounds: Youssou Ndoye 11.7
- Assists: Tsao Xun-Xiang 4.5

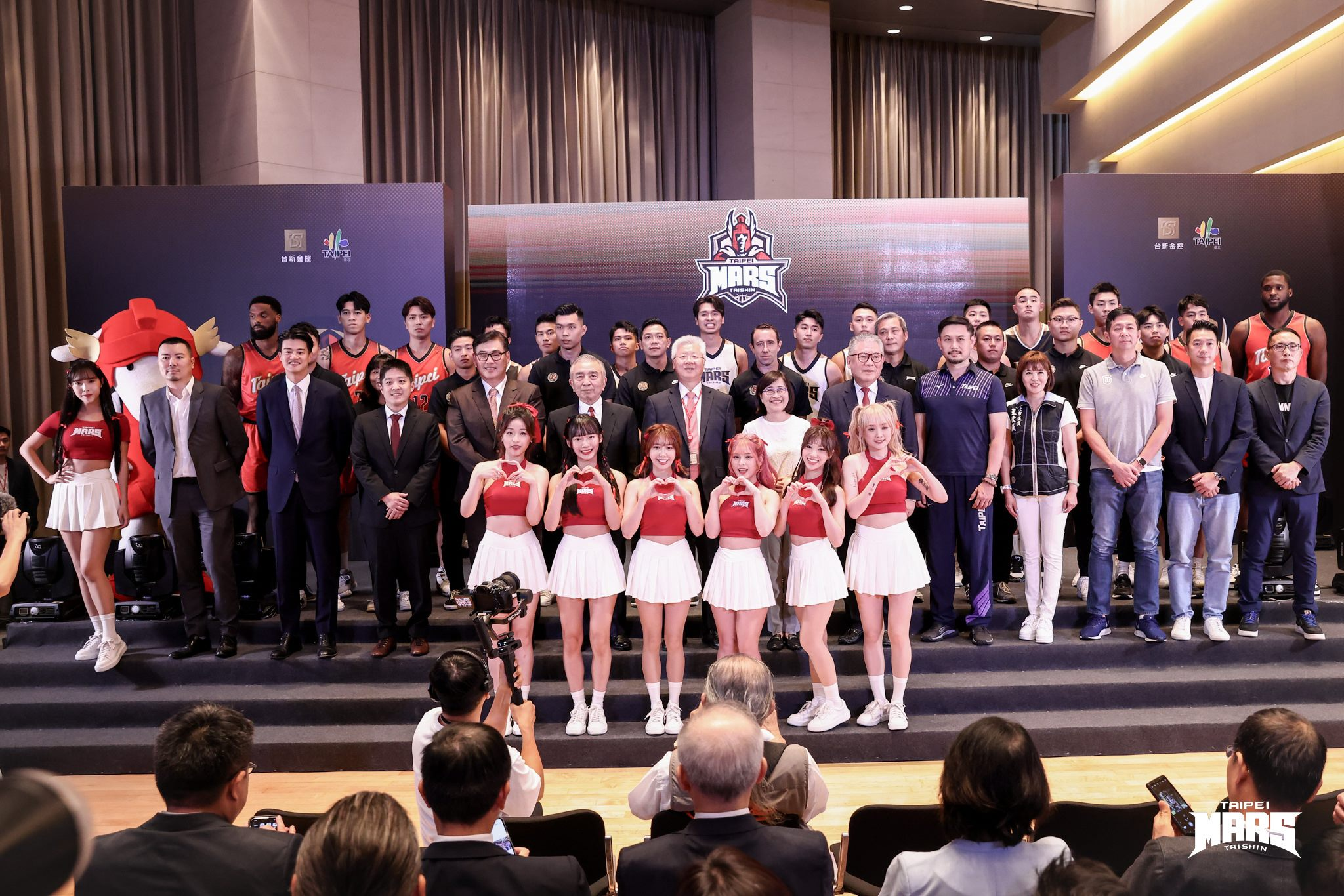
Taipei Taishin Mars held the preseason press conference on September 14, 2023.

The 2023–24 Taipei Mars season was the franchise's first season, its first season in the T1 League.

The Mars were coached by Brian Adams in his first year as their head coach. On July 14, 2023, the Mars hired Lin You-Ting as their general manager. On December 31, the Mars announced that Brian Adams resigned from head coach. On January 3, 2024, the Mars named Hsu Hao-Cheng, the assistant coach of the Taipei Mars, as their interim head coach.

== Draft ==
Round	Pick	Player	Position(s)	School / club team
1	3	Chang Chao-Chen	Forward	NTNU
1	4	Chien Ho-Yu	Guard	SHU

- Reference：

On March 16, 2022, the HeroBears acquired 2022 and 2023 second-round picks from Taichung Wagor Suns in exchange for Chou Tzu-Hua.

On June 26, 2023, the T1 League announced that the Taishin Sports Entertainment Co., Ltd. took over the participation rights of the TaiwanBeer HeroBears.

On June 26, 2023, the T1 League announced that the Taishin acquired the draft rights from the TaiwanBeer HeroBears (2023 first-round 4th pick and 2023 second-round pick traded from Taichung Wagor Suns). And the Taishin acquired the second pick and the last pick (additional draft rights) in each round of 2023 T1 League draft.

On July 12, 2023, the Taishin's 2023 first-round 2nd pick was traded to TaiwanBeer Leopards in exchange for Huang Tsung-Han and 2024 first-round pick.

On July 12, 2023, the Taishin acquired 2023 first-round pick from Taichung Suns in exchange for 2023 second-round 3rd pick and 2024 second-round pick.

On August 4, 2023, the Taishin Sports Entertainment Co., Ltd. announced to terminate cooperation with Chien Ho-Yu due to involving in violence.

== Roster ==
2023–24 Taipei Mars roster
Players
Coaches

Pos.	No.	Nat.	Name	Ht.	Wt.	Age	From
SG	0	(Taiwan)	Lin Ping-Sheng	1.84 m (6 ft 0 in)	77 kg (170 lb)	27 – 26 December 1996	CCU
PG	3	(Taiwan)	Ting Sheng-Ju	1.74 m (5 ft 9 in)	75 kg (165 lb)	25 – 22 August 1998	St. Francis
PG	5	(Taiwan)	Lin Li	1.83 m (6 ft 0 in)	81 kg (179 lb)	22 – 20 June 2001	NCCU
PF	7	(Taiwan)	Liu Yen-Ting	1.96 m (6 ft 5 in)	96 kg (212 lb)	24 – 7 January 2000	OCU
SF	8	(Taiwan)	Chen Wen-Hung	1.88 m (6 ft 2 in)	98 kg (216 lb)	32 – 14 July 1991	NTSU
PF	9	(Taiwan)	Chang Chao-Chen	1.96 m (6 ft 5 in)	97 kg (214 lb)	23 – 2 September 2000	NTNU
C	10	(United States)	Jaylen Johnson (I)	2.06 m (6 ft 9 in)	104 kg (229 lb)	27 – 7 August 1996	Louisville
SF	11	(Taiwan)	Huang Tsung-Han	1.93 m (6 ft 4 in)	96 kg (212 lb)	29 – 7 July 1994	MDU
PF	12	(Taiwan)	Lin Yi-Huei (C)	1.92 m (6 ft 4 in)	100 kg (220 lb)	38 – 24 March 1986	NTNU
F	15	(United States)	Rahlir Hollis-Jefferson (I)	1.98 m (6 ft 6 in)	98 kg (216 lb)	32 – 26 June 1991	Temple
C	20	(Taiwan)	Sun Szu-Yao	2.03 m (6 ft 8 in)	105 kg (231 lb)	26 – 3 October 1997	NYIT
SG	24	(Taiwan)	Hsu Ching-En	1.90 m (6 ft 3 in)	90 kg (198 lb)	22 – 11 July 2001	NTNU
SG	29	(Taiwan)	Chang Keng-Yu	1.88 m (6 ft 2 in)	88 kg (194 lb)	28 – 16 October 1995	NTUS
C	30	(Ukraine)	Vladyslav Koreniuk (I)	2.10 m (6 ft 11 in)	123 kg (271 lb)	30 – 8 January 1994	Ukraine
C	35	(Senegal)	Youssou Ndoye (I)	2.13 m (7 ft 0 in)	113 kg (249 lb)	32 – 15 July 1991	St. Bonaventure
SG	57	(Taiwan) (Vietnam)	Tsao Xun-Xiang	1.81 m (5 ft 11 in)	81 kg (179 lb)	25 – 16 March 1999	NTUA

Head coach

- (Taiwan) Hsu Hao-Cheng (interim)

Assistant coach(es)

- (Taiwan) Peng Te-Hsuan
- (Taiwan) Ni Hsueh-Chien
- (Serbia) Milan Stevanovic

Strength & conditioning coach(es)

- (Taiwan) Chen Hung-Lin
- (Taiwan) Chiang Cheng-Han

Athletic trainer(s)

- (Taiwan) Chien Shao-Fu
- (Taiwan) Guan Yen-Lin

Team manager

- (Taiwan) Lin You-Ting

Legend

- (C) Team captain
- (I) Import player
- Injured

- Roster
Updated: June 1, 2024

== 2023 interleague play ==
=== Standings ===
Pos	Team	Pld	W	L	PCT	GB
1	NCCU Griffins	5	5	0	1.000	—
2	Bank of Taiwan	5	4	1	.800	1
3	Taipei Taishin Mars	5	3	2	.600	2
4	Taiwan Beer	5	2	3	.400	3
5	Changhua BLL	5	1	4	.200	4
6	Pilots / Dreamers United Training Team	5	0	5	.000	5

Source: Official website

=== Game log ===
September 16, 2023	Taipei Taishin Mars	86–77	Changhua BLL	Taipei City
19:30 (UTC+8)	Scoring by quarter: 26–21, 24–18, 14–21, 22–17
	Pts: Lin Ping-Sheng 24; Rebs: Sun Szu-Yao 10; Asts: Lin Ping-Sheng 7	boxscore	Pts: Hsieh Cheng-An 22; Rebs: Kuo Han 11; Asts: Tsai Houng-Yang 5	Arena: Taipei Heping Basketball Gymnasium

September 17, 2023	Taiwan Beer	71–80	Taipei Taishin Mars	Taipei City
17:00 (UTC+8)	Scoring by quarter: 25–20, 11–13, 20–18, 15–29
	Pts: Wu Chi-Ying 19; Rebs: Chu I-Tsung 8 Asts: Wu Chi-Ying, Chen Chao-Hao 3	boxscore	Pts: Lin Ping-Sheng 24; Rebs: Sun Szu-Yao 8 Asts: Lin Ping-Sheng, Ting Sheng-Ju 5	Arena: Taipei Heping Basketball Gymnasium

September 18, 2023	Pilots / Dreamers United Training Team	69–88	Taipei Taishin Mars	Taipei City
19:00 (UTC+8)	Scoring by quarter: 20–22, 24–25, 17–20, 8–21
	Pts: Kuan Ta-You 13; Rebs: Hu Chin-Hao 7 Asts: Kuan Ta-You 6	boxscore	Pts: Tsao Xun-Xiang 21; Rebs: Chang Chao-Chen 11; Asts: Tsao Xun-Xiang 6	Arena: Taipei Heping Basketball Gymnasium

September 20, 2023	NCCU Griffins	98–70	Taipei Taishin Mars	Taipei City
17:00 (UTC+8)	Scoring by quarter: 23–18, 24–15, 22–19, 29–18
	Pts: Chuan Chao-Sheng 20; Rebs: Boubacar Mboup 14; Asts: Yu Ai-Che 8	boxscore	Pts: Tsao Xun-Xiang 12; Rebs: Lin Ping-Sheng 8 Asts: Lin Yi-Huei 7	Arena: Taipei Heping Basketball Gymnasium

September 21, 2023	Taipei Taishin Mars	71–85	Bank of Taiwan	Taipei City
17:00 (UTC+8)	Scoring by quarter: 14–16, 21–17, 15–26, 21–26
	Pts: Lin Ping-Sheng 18; Rebs: Lin Ping-Sheng, Liu Yen-Ting 9 Asts: Ting Sheng-Ju 8	boxscore	Pts: Lin Jyun-Hao 19; Rebs: Lin Jyun-Hao 10; Asts: Lin Zhe-Ting 5	Arena: Taipei Heping Basketball Gymnasium

== Preseason ==
=== Game log ===
2023 preseason game log
Total: 0–2 (home: 0–1; road: 0–1)
Preseason : 0–2 (home: 0–1; road: 0–1)

Game	Date	Team	Score	High points	High rebounds	High assists	Location Attendance	Record
1	October 14	@ GhostHawks	L 91–100	Erik McCree (23)	Jaylen Johnson (15)	Lin Ping-Sheng (4); Ting Sheng-Ju (4)	Xinzhuang Gymnasium; 2,876	0–1
2	October 15	Leopards	L 85–95	Jaylen Johnson (23)	Jaylen Johnson (16)	Lin Ping-Sheng (4); Matt Mobley (4)	Xinzhuang Gymnasium; 3,198	0–2

Color： Win Lose
Schedule

== Regular season ==
=== Standings ===
Pos	Team	Pld	W	L	PCT	GB	Qualification
1	New Taipei CTBC DEA	28	19	9	.679	—	Advance to semifinals
2	Taiwan Beer Leopards	28	18	10	.643	1	Advance to semifinals
3	Kaohsiung Aquas	28	15	13	.536	4	Advance to semifinals
4	Taipei Mars	28	11	17	.393	8	Advance to semifinals
5	Tainan TSG GhostHawks	28	7	21	.250	12	

Source: T1 League

=== Game log ===
2023–24 regular season game log
Total: 11–17 (home: 7–7; road: 4–10)
November : 1–2 (home: 1–1; road: 0–1)

Game	Date	Team	Score	High points	High rebounds	High assists	Location Attendance	Record
1	November 19	@ Leopards	L 99–102	Youssou Ndoye (32)	Jaylen Johnson (16)	Ting Sheng-Ju (7)	Taoyuan Arena; 1,688	0–1
2	November 25	DEA	L 79–104	Jaylen Johnson (11); Danny Pippen (11); Tsao Xun-Xiang (11)	Jaylen Johnson (14)	Jaylen Johnson (4)	Taipei Heping Basketball Gymnasium; 5,700	0–2
3	November 26	Aquas	W 124–110	Ting Sheng-Ju (27)	Youssou Ndoye (15)	Ting Sheng-Ju (5)	Taipei Heping Basketball Gymnasium; 4,502	1–2

December : 1–6 (home: 0–4; road: 1–2)

Game	Date	Team	Score	High points	High rebounds	High assists	Location Attendance	Record
4	December 2	@ Leopards	W 111–104	Youssou Ndoye (31)	Jaylen Johnson (14)	Ting Sheng-Ju (13)	Taoyuan Arena; 1,987	2–2
5	December 10	@ DEA	L 85–86	Erik McCree (36)	Erik McCree (15); Youssou Ndoye (15)	Ting Sheng-Ju (5)	Xinzhuang Gymnasium; 4,280	2–3
6	December 17	@ GhostHawks	L 90–112	Youssou Ndoye (20)	Erik McCree (12)	Lin Ping-Sheng (6)	Chia Nan University of Pharmacy and Science Shao Tsung Gymnasium; 1,666	2–4
7	December 23	Aquas	L 98–114	Erik McCree (25)	Jaylen Johnson (11)	Ting Sheng-Ju (7)	Taipei Heping Basketball Gymnasium; 4,344	2–5
8	December 24	Leopards	L 102–109	Erik McCree (26)	Danny Pippen (14)	Ting Sheng-Ju (5); Lin Ping-Sheng (5)	Taipei Heping Basketball Gymnasium; 4,588	2–6
9	December 30	Aquas	L 106–109	Jaylen Johnson (33)	Erik McCree (15)	Erik McCree (6); Ting Sheng-Ju (6)	Taipei Heping Basketball Gymnasium; 3,456	2–7
10	December 31	Leopards	L 113–120	Erik McCree (27)	Youssou Ndoye (11)	Erik McCree (5); Lin Ping-Sheng (5)	Taipei Heping Basketball Gymnasium; 3,663	2–8

January : 2–3 (home: 2–2; road: 0–1)

Game	Date	Team	Score	High points	High rebounds	High assists	Location Attendance	Record
11	January 6	GhostHawks	W 119–112	Erik McCree (31)	Jaylen Johnson (13)	Erik McCree (4)	Taipei Heping Basketball Gymnasium; 2,672	3–8
12	January 7	DEA	L 91–105	Jaylen Johnson (24)	Danny Pippen (8); Chen Wen-Hung (8)	Ting Sheng-Ju (6)	Taipei Heping Basketball Gymnasium; 3,374	3–9
13	January 12	@ Aquas	L 86–111	Jaylen Johnson (19); Lin Ping-Sheng (19); Tsao Xun-Xiang (19)	Jaylen Johnson (9)	Tsao Xun-Xiang (5)	Kaohsiung Arena; 3,982	3–10
14	January 20	DEA	L 75–94	Youssou Ndoye (21)	Youssou Ndoye (10)	Tsao Xun-Xiang (5)	Taipei Heping Basketball Gymnasium; 4,291	3–11
15	January 21	GhostHawks	W 107–99	Youssou Ndoye (26)	Jaylen Johnson (12)	Tsao Xun-Xiang (7)	Taipei Heping Basketball Gymnasium; 3,509	4–11

February : 1–1 (home: 1–0; road: 0–1)

Game	Date	Team	Score	High points	High rebounds	High assists	Location Attendance	Record
16	February 17	@ Aquas	L 94–98	Rahlir Hollis-Jefferson (34)	Rahlir Hollis-Jefferson (7)	Chen Wen-Hung (5); Rahlir Hollis-Jefferson (5)	Kaohsiung Arena; 6,057	4–12
17	February 24	GhostHawks	W 96–89	Youssou Ndoye (22)	Youssou Ndoye (19)	Tsao Xun-Xiang (7)	Taipei Heping Basketball Gymnasium; 4,280	5–12
—	February 25	@ DEA	Rescheduled to February 28					
—	February 28	@ DEA	Rescheduled to April 13					

March : 3–1 (home: 2–0; road: 1–1)

Game	Date	Team	Score	High points	High rebounds	High assists	Location Attendance	Record
18	March 2	@ DEA	L 83–87	Lin Ping-Sheng (20)	Jaylen Johnson (17)	Jaylen Johnson (7)	Xinzhuang Gymnasium; 3,673	5–13
19	March 3	@ GhostHawks	W 92–90	Rahlir Hollis-Jefferson (21)	Vladyslav Koreniuk (14)	Chen Wen-Hung (4); Tsao Xun-Xiang (4)	Chia Nan University of Pharmacy and Science Shao Tsung Gymnasium; 1,664	6–13
20	March 23	Aquas	W 100–94	Lin Ping-Sheng (25)	Youssou Ndoye (18)	Lin Ping-Sheng (6)	Taipei Heping Basketball Gymnasium; 4,868	7–13
21	March 24	Leopards	W 126–96	Rahlir Hollis-Jefferson (22)	Youssou Ndoye (12)	Tsao Xun-Xiang (13)	Taipei Heping Basketball Gymnasium; 4,672	8–13

April : 3–4 (home: 1–0; road: 2–4)

Game	Date	Team	Score	High points	High rebounds	High assists	Location Attendance	Record
22	April 6	@ GhostHawks	L 106–109 (OT)	Lin Ping-Sheng (24)	Youssou Ndoye (9); Lin Ping-Sheng (9)	Tsao Xun-Xiang (6); Lin Ping-Sheng (6)	Chia Nan University of Pharmacy and Science Shao Tsung Gymnasium; 1,248	8–14
23	April 7	@ Aquas	L 89–107	Lin Ping-Sheng (32)	Jaylen Johnson (12)	Lin Ping-Sheng (4)	Kaohsiung Arena; 5,573	8–15
—	April 13	@ Leopards	Rescheduled to April 20					
24	April 13	@ DEA	L 81–88	Youssou Ndoye (17)	Youssou Ndoye (13)	Tsao Xun-Xiang (5)	Taipei Dome; 15,600	8–16
25	April 14	@ DEA	W 114–76	Rahlir Hollis-Jefferson (28)	Youssou Ndoye (16)	Tsao Xun-Xiang (8)	Taipei Dome; 15,600	9–16
26	April 20	@ Leopards	L 96–101	Youssou Ndoye (26)	Youssou Ndoye (20)	Rahlir Hollis-Jefferson (4); Lin Ping-Sheng (4)	Taoyuan Arena; 4,015	9–17
27	April 21	@ Leopards	W 91–79	Ting Sheng-Ju (26)	Vladyslav Koreniuk (14)	Ting Sheng-Ju (6)	Taoyuan Arena; 5,267	10–17
28	April 28	GhostHawks	W 97–70	Youssou Ndoye (20)	Youssou Ndoye (15)	Tsao Xun-Xiang (10)	Taipei Heping Basketball Gymnasium; 4,861	11–17

Color： Win Lose Rescheduled
Schedule

=== Regular season note ===
- Due to the 2025 FIBA Asia Cup qualification, the T1 League declared that the games on February 25 would be rescheduled to February 28.
- Due to the second home arena application of New Taipei CTBC DEA, the T1 League declared that the games on February 28 and April 13 would be rescheduled to April 13 and 20.

== Playoffs ==
=== Game log ===
2024 playoffs game log
Total: 3–6 (home: 1–3; road: 2–3)
Semifinals : 3–2 (home: 1–1; road: 2–1)

Game	Date	Team	Score	High points	High rebounds	High assists	Location Attendance	Series
1	May 4	@ DEA	W 95–94 (OT)	Jaylen Johnson (23)	Jaylen Johnson (16)	Vladyslav Koreniuk (5); Jaylen Johnson (5)	Xinzhuang Gymnasium; 3,183	1–0
2	May 6	@ DEA	L 88–95	Lin Ping-Sheng (30)	Youssou Ndoye (14)	Youssou Ndoye (6)	Xinzhuang Gymnasium; 5,057	1–1
3	May 9	DEA	W 80–72	Lin Ping-Sheng (24)	Youssou Ndoye (17)	Tsao Xun-Xiang (9)	National Taiwan University Sports Center; 3,326	2–1
4	May 11	DEA	L 71–81	Youssou Ndoye (25)	Youssou Ndoye (13)	Jaylen Johnson (5)	National Taiwan University Sports Center; 3,775	2–2
5	May 14	@ DEA	W 97–91	Youssou Ndoye (34)	Youssou Ndoye (16)	Lin Ping-Sheng (7)	Xinzhuang Gymnasium; 5,650	3–2

Finals : 0–4 (home: 0–2; road: 0–2)

Game	Date	Team	Score	High points	High rebounds	High assists	Location Attendance	Series
1	May 24	@ Leopards	L 101–106	Lin Ping-Sheng (25)	Vladyslav Koreniuk (12)	Chen Wen-Hung (5); Youssou Ndoye (5)	Taoyuan Arena; 5,019	0–1
2	May 26	@ Leopards	L 107–112	Lin Ping-Sheng (38)	Jaylen Johnson (15)	Lin Ping-Sheng (8)	Taoyuan Arena; 6,869	0–2
3	May 30	Leopards	L 79–94	Lin Ping-Sheng (24)	Jaylen Johnson (12)	Jaylen Johnson (7)	Taipei Heping Basketball Gymnasium; 3,754	0–3
4	June 1	Leopards	L 80–108	Jaylen Johnson (30)	Jaylen Johnson (14)	Jaylen Johnson (5); Tsao Xun-Xiang (5)	Taipei Heping Basketball Gymnasium; 5,000	0–4

Color： Win Lose
Schedule

== Player statistics ==
Legend
GP	Games played	MPG	Minutes per game	FG%	Field goal percentage
3P%	3-point field goal percentage	FT%	Free throw percentage	RPG	Rebounds per game
APG	Assists per game	SPG	Steals per game	BPG	Blocks per game
PPG	Points per game		Led the league

=== Regular season ===
Player	GP	MPG	PPG	FG%	3P%	FT%	RPG	APG	SPG	BPG
Lin Ping-Sheng	23	28:36	15.4	43.4%	26.9%	76.5%	4.3	3.5	2.6	0.1
Erik McCree^{‡}	9	34:09	27.1	52.4%	33.3%	75.0%	10.0	2.7	1.2	0.7
Ting Sheng-Ju	26	22:34	6.6	36.8%	26.0%	78.8%	2.2	3.6	1.1	0.1
Danny Pippen^{‡}	9	21:28	10.4	42.9%	29.0%	68.4%	5.3	1.1	0.9	0.4
Lin Li	3	10:44	0.7	25.0%	0.0%	0.0%	1.0	1.3	1.0	0.0
Liu Yen-Ting	7	2:38	1.6	57.1%	50.0%	50.0%	0.7	0.3	0.0	0.0
Chen Wen-Hung	28	30:55	6.0	40.1%	37.0%	50.0%	3.0	1.8	0.8	0.1
Chang Chao-Chen	8	1:51	0.8	42.9%	0.0%	0.0%	0.3	0.1	0.1	0.1
Jaylen Johnson	21	32:02	15.0	43.9%	25.7%	68.4%	9.9	2.9	1.0	1.1
Huang Tsung-Han	28	27:15	8.6	30.5%	31.7%	87.9%	2.2	0.9	1.1	0.1
Lin Yi-Huei	24	10:50	3.2	42.5%	34.2%	15.4%	1.3	1.0	0.3	0.1
Rahlir Hollis-Jefferson^{≠}	12	34:57	18.2	36.8%	39.6%	75.0%	8.1	3.8	2.1	0.8
Sun Szu-Yao	16	7:28	1.2	36.0%	0.0%	50.0%	1.3	0.3	0.2	0.2
Hsu Ching-En	3	1:32	0.0	0.0%	0.0%	0.0%	0.0	0.3	0.0	0.0
Chang Keng-Yu	22	12:40	2.8	30.7%	16.7%	83.3%	1.1	0.2	0.2	0.0
Vladyslav Koreniuk^{≠}	10	25:38	12.9	65.1%	25.0%	57.1%	8.4	1.1	0.4	0.7
Youssou Ndoye	21	33:27	18.8	58.2%	0.0%	63.4%	11.7	1.5	1.1	1.2
Tsao Xun-Xiang	25	23:35	9.8	42.1%	37.3%	73.5%	2.8	4.5	0.8	0.0

^{‡} Left during the season
^{≠} Acquired during the season

=== Semifinals ===
Player	GP	MPG	PPG	FG%	3P%	FT%	RPG	APG	SPG	BPG
Lin Ping-Sheng	5	37:24	17.4	38.8%	27.3%	84.2%	5.6	3.4	2.2	0.2
Ting Sheng-Ju	5	17:41	4.8	24.0%	11.8%	71.4%	1.8	1.6	0.6	0.0
Lin Li	1	0:02	0.0	0.0%	0.0%	0.0%	0.0	0.0	0.0	0.0
Liu Yen-Ting	Did not play									
Chen Wen-Hung	5	35:04	5.8	35.5%	30.4%	0.0%	4.0	1.2	0.8	0.0
Chang Chao-Chen	Did not play									
Jaylen Johnson	5	39:33	16.2	39.2%	15.6%	60.9%	11.4	4.2	3.4	1.4
Huang Tsung-Han	5	22:21	4.0	15.8%	14.3%	75.0%	2.8	1.0	1.0	0.2
Lin Yi-Huei	2	10:51	2.0	28.6%	0.0%	0.0%	2.0	0.5	0.0	0.0
Rahlir Hollis-Jefferson	1	7:25	8.0	75.0%	50.0%	100.0%	0.0	1.0	1.0	0.0
Sun Szu-Yao	3	2:42	0.0	0.0%	0.0%	0.0%	0.7	0.3	0.0	0.0
Hsu Ching-En	Did not play									
Chang Keng-Yu	1	2:02	0.0	0.0%	0.0%	0.0%	0.0	0.0	0.0	0.0
Vladyslav Koreniuk	5	19:34	7.0	41.2%	33.3%	66.7%	4.2	1.0	0.6	0.6
Youssou Ndoye	4	43:45	25.3	67.2%	0.0%	79.2%	15.0	2.8	0.5	0.8
Tsao Xun-Xiang	5	30:27	8.4	22.2%	23.8%	100.0%	3.8	4.2	1.2	0.0

=== Finals ===
Player	GP	MPG	PPG	FG%	3P%	FT%	RPG	APG	SPG	BPG
Lin Ping-Sheng	4	36:03	25.0	48.1%	35.7%	70.0%	4.8	4.5	2.8	0.3
Ting Sheng-Ju	3	12:04	0.3	0.0%	0.0%	50.0%	2.7	2.0	0.0	0.0
Lin Li	2	2:10	0.0	0.0%	0.0%	0.0%	0.5	0.5	0.0	0.0
Liu Yen-Ting	1	2:30	0.0	0.0%	0.0%	0.0%	0.0	0.0	0.0	0.0
Chen Wen-Hung	4	25:50	5.5	29.2%	27.8%	75.0%	3.0	2.3	0.5	0.5
Chang Chao-Chen	2	1:45	1.0	33.3%	0.0%	0.0%	1.0	0.0	0.0	0.0
Jaylen Johnson	4	43:01	19.0	43.3%	30.0%	63.2%	13.0	4.8	2.0	0.8
Huang Tsung-Han	4	23:49	7.8	29.4%	32.0%	100.0%	1.8	0.3	1.5	0.0
Lin Yi-Huei	3	19:10	6.7	38.9%	27.3%	60.0%	3.0	1.0	1.0	0.0
Rahlir Hollis-Jefferson	Did not play									
Sun Szu-Yao	2	3:11	0.0	0.0%	0.0%	0.0%	1.5	0.0	0.0	0.5
Hsu Ching-En	Did not play									
Chang Keng-Yu	2	22:58	6.5	60.0%	33.3%	0.0%	3.0	0.0	0.5	0.0
Vladyslav Koreniuk	3	14:36	6.0	53.8%	0.0%	66.7%	4.7	0.7	0.0	0.7
Youssou Ndoye	3	32:03	15.0	55.2%	0.0%	76.5%	8.3	2.3	0.0	0.3
Tsao Xun-Xiang	4	37:10	9.8	34.8%	30.0%	50.0%	4.3	3.8	1.5	0.3

- Reference：

== Transactions ==
=== Overview ===
Players added

Via draft

- Chang Chao-Chen

Via trade

- Huang Tsung-Han

Via free agency

- Chang Keng-Yu
- Chen Wen-Hung
- Rahlir Hollis-Jefferson
- Hsu Ching-En
- Jaylen Johnson
- Vladyslav Koreniuk
- Lin Li
- Lin Ping-Sheng
- Lin Yi-Huei
- Liu Yen-Ting
- Erik McCree
- Matt Mobley
- Youssou Ndoye
- Danny Pippen
- Sun Szu-Yao
- Ting Sheng-Ju
- Tsao Xun-Xiang
Players lost

Waived

- Erik McCree
- Matt Mobley
- Danny Pippen

=== Trades ===
Date	Trade		Ref.
July 12, 2023	To Taipei Taishin basketball team: Huang Tsung-Han; 2024 Leopards' first-round pick	To TaiwanBeer Leopards: 2023 Taishin's first-round 2nd pick	
July 12, 2023	To Taipei Taishin basketball team: 2023 Suns' first-round pick	To Taichung Suns: 2023 Taishin's second-round 3rd pick; 2024 Taishin's second-round pick	

=== Free agency ===
==== Additions ====
Date	Player	Contract terms	Former team	Ref.
July 14, 2023	Ting Sheng-Ju	—N/a	(Taiwan) Taichung Suns	
July 14, 2023	Lin Yi-Huei	2-year contract, worth unknown	(Taiwan) Taoyuan Leopards	
July 14, 2023	Chen Wen-Hung	—N/a	(Taiwan) Taichung Suns	
July 14, 2023	Chang Keng-Yu	—N/a	(Taiwan) Taipei Fubon Braves	
July 14, 2023	Tsao Xun-Xiang	—N/a	(Taiwan) TaiwanBeer HeroBears	
August 16, 2023	Lin Ping-Sheng	1+2-year contract, worth unknown	(Taiwan) New Taipei CTBC DEA	
August 24, 2023	Chang Chao-Chen	—N/a	(Taiwan) NTNU	
August 24, 2023	Sun Szu-Yao	—N/a	(Taiwan) Kaohsiung 17LIVE Steelers	
August 24, 2023	Hsu Ching-En	—N/a	(Taiwan) NTNU	
August 24, 2023	Liu Yen-Ting	—N/a	(Taiwan) OCU	
August 24, 2023	Lin Li	—N/a	(Taiwan) NCCU	
September 14, 2023	Erik McCree	—N/a	(Philippines) Magnolia Hotshots	
September 14, 2023	Jaylen Johnson	—N/a	(Uruguay) Nacional	
October 6, 2023	Matt Mobley	—N/a	(France) JDA Dijon Basket	
October 18, 2023	Youssou Ndoye	—N/a	(Spain) Covirán Granada	
November 17, 2023	Danny Pippen	—N/a	(Lebanon) CS Maristes	
January 17, 2024	Vladyslav Koreniuk	—N/a	(China) Jiangxi Ganchi	
February 6, 2024	Rahlir Hollis-Jefferson	—N/a	(Philippines) TNT Tropang Giga	

==== Subtractions ====
Date	Player	Reason	New team	Ref.
November 10, 2023	Matt Mobley	Contract terminated	(France) SLUC Nancy Basket	
January 17, 2024	Danny Pippen	Contract terminated	(France) UB Chartres Métropole	
February 6, 2024	Erik McCree	Contract terminated	(Venezuela) Broncos de Caracas	

== Awards ==
=== Yearly awards ===
Recipient	Award	Ref.
Lin Ping-Sheng	All-Defensive First Team	
Lin Ping-Sheng	Sixth Man of the Year	
Lin Ping-Sheng	Most Improved Player	
Taishin Wonders	Best Cheerleaders of the Year	
