= 2023–24 New Taipei CTBC DEA season =

Taiwanese professional basketball season

- President: Chen Kuo-En
- General Manager: Liu Chih-Wei
- Head Coach: Lee Yi-Hua
- Arena: Xinzhuang Gymnasium; Taipei Dome (co-home arena)

T1 League results
- Record: 19–9 (67.9%)
- Place: 1st
- Playoffs finish: Semifinals (lost to Mars, 2–3)

Player records
- Points: Mohammad Al Bachir Gadiaga 22.5
- Rebounds: Dragan Zeković 6.6
- Assists: Hsieh Ya-Hsuan 4.2

The 2023–24 New Taipei CTBC DEA season was the franchise's third season, its third season in the T1 League.

The DEA were coached by Lee Yi-Hua in his third year as their head coach.

== Draft ==
Round	Pick	Player	Position(s)	School / club team
1	6	Li Pei-Cheng	Guard	FJU

- Reference：

== Roster ==
2023–24 New Taipei CTBC DEA roster
Players
Coaches

Pos.	No.	Nat.	Name	Ht.	Wt.	Age	From
F	0	(Taiwan)	Mohammad Al Bachir Gadiaga	1.89 m (6 ft 2 in)	92 kg (203 lb)	26 – 27 April 1998	SHU
C	1	(Lithuania)	Edgaras Želionis (I)	2.07 m (6 ft 9 in)	97 kg (214 lb)	34 – 4 June 1989	Lithuania
PG	2	(Taiwan)	Liu Jen-Hao	1.75 m (5 ft 9 in)	70 kg (154 lb)	28 – 10 November 1995	UCH
F	4	(Taiwan)	Liu Min-Yan	1.95 m (6 ft 5 in)	85 kg (187 lb)	24 – 4 December 1999	NKNU
PG	7	(Taiwan)	Wei Chia-Hao	1.82 m (6 ft 0 in)	78 kg (172 lb)	24 – 13 January 2000	FJU
C	9	(Croatia)	Kristijan Krajina (I)	2.08 m (6 ft 10 in)	111 kg (245 lb)	33 – 28 December 1990	Mount St. Mary's
SG	10	(Taiwan)	Hsieh Ya-Hsuan	1.87 m (6 ft 2 in)	81 kg (179 lb)	25 – 30 October 1998	UCH
PF	11	(Taiwan)	Zhou Cheng-Rui	1.93 m (6 ft 4 in)	82 kg (181 lb)	24 – 24 February 2000	CCU
PF	12	(Taiwan) (United Kingdom)	Jonah Morrison	2.03 m (6 ft 8 in)	105 kg (231 lb)	23 – 2 June 2000	UBC
F	13	(Taiwan)	Chen Yu-An	1.92 m (6 ft 4 in)	88 kg (194 lb)	23 – 26 May 2000	UT
PG	16	(Taiwan)	Lin Wei-Han (C)	1.80 m (5 ft 11 in)	71 kg (157 lb)	33 – 9 July 1990	FJU
F	22	(Taiwan)	Huang Hung-Han	1.92 m (6 ft 4 in)	92 kg (203 lb)	29 – 15 October 1994	UCH
C	27	(Montenegro) (Serbia)	Dragan Zeković (I)	2.10 m (6 ft 11 in)	109 kg (240 lb)	36 – 27 May 1987	Serbia
SF	30	(Taiwan)	Liu Weir-Chern	1.90 m (6 ft 3 in)	84 kg (185 lb)	35 – 27 November 1988	MDU
C	76	(Taiwan)	Tseng Wen-Ting	2.04 m (6 ft 8 in)	98 kg (216 lb)	39 – 6 July 1984	TPEC
SG	77	(Taiwan)	Li Pei-Cheng	1.81 m (5 ft 11 in)	79 kg (174 lb)	23 – 25 October 2000	FJU
PG	93	(United States)	Cody Demps (I)	1.93 m (6 ft 4 in)	88 kg (194 lb)	30 – 2 December 1993	Sacramento State

Head coach

- (Taiwan) Lee Yi-Hua

Assistant coach(es)

- (Serbia) Momir Ratković

Strength & conditioning coach(es)

- (Taiwan) Mu Chien-Hung

Athletic trainer(s)

- (Taiwan) Li Kuo-Yi
- (Taiwan) Fan Hsiang-Yu

Team manager

- (Taiwan) Liu Chih-Wei

Legend

- (C) Team captain
- (I) Import player
- Injured

- Roster
Updated: May 9, 2024

== Preseason ==
=== Game log ===
2023 preseason game log
Total: 1–1 (home: 1–0; road: 0–1)
Preseason : 1–1 (home: 1–0; road: 0–1)

Game	Date	Team	Score	High points	High rebounds	High assists	Location Attendance	Record
1	October 13	GhostHawks	W 114–108	Viktor Gaddefors (28)	Kristijan Krajina (6); Huang Hung-Han (6)	Liu Jen-Hao (8)	Xinzhuang Gymnasium; 753	1–0
2	October 15	@ Aquas	L 80–87	Dragan Zeković (21)	Viktor Gaddefors (15)	Viktor Gaddefors (7)	Xinzhuang Gymnasium; 1,932	1–1

Color： Win Lose
Schedule

== Interleague Basketball Games ==
=== Game log ===
Recap

October 21, 2023
17:00 (UTC+8)

Formosa Dreamers	107–101	New Taipei CTBC DEA

Taichung Intercontinental Basketball Stadium, Taichung City

Recap

October 22, 2023
14:30 (UTC+8)

New Taipei CTBC DEA	99–86	Taoyuan Pauian Pilots

Taichung Intercontinental Basketball Stadium, Taichung City

== Regular season ==
=== Standings ===
Pos	Team	Pld	W	L	PCT	GB	Qualification
1	New Taipei CTBC DEA	28	19	9	.679	—	Advance to semifinals
2	Taiwan Beer Leopards	28	18	10	.643	1	Advance to semifinals
3	Kaohsiung Aquas	28	15	13	.536	4	Advance to semifinals
4	Taipei Mars	28	11	17	.393	8	Advance to semifinals
5	Tainan TSG GhostHawks	28	7	21	.250	12	

Source: T1 League

With a victory against the Kaohsiung Aquas on April 27, 2024, the DEA clinched the league's best record for the 2023–24 season.

=== Game log ===
2023–24 regular season game log
Total: 19–9 (home: 10–4; road: 9–5)
October : 2–0 (home: 2–0; road: 0–0)

Game	Date	Team	Score	High points	High rebounds	High assists	Location Attendance	Record
1	October 28	GhostHawks	W 106–92	Mohammad Al Bachir Gadiaga (22)	Mohammad Al Bachir Gadiaga (7); Kristijan Krajina (7); Tseng Wen-Ting (7)	Kristijan Krajina (7); Viktor Gaddefors (7)	Xinzhuang Gymnasium; 4,182	1–0
2	October 29	Aquas	W 86–77	Viktor Gaddefors (31)	Kristijan Krajina (11); Viktor Gaddefors (11)	Wei Chia-Hao (5)	Xinzhuang Gymnasium; 4,032	2–0

November : 2–0 (home: 0–0; road: 2–0)

Game	Date	Team	Score	High points	High rebounds	High assists	Location Attendance	Record
3	November 18	@ Leopards	W 87–73	Mohammad Al Bachir Gadiaga (25)	Kristijan Krajina (16); Viktor Gaddefors (16)	Viktor Gaddefors (4); Huang Hung-Han (4)	Taoyuan Arena; 2,118	3–0
4	November 25	@ Mars	W 104–79	Mohammad Al Bachir Gadiaga (32)	Viktor Gaddefors (10); Dragan Zeković (10)	Viktor Gaddefors (7)	Taipei Heping Basketball Gymnasium; 5,700	4–0

December : 4–3 (home: 3–1; road: 1–2)

Game	Date	Team	Score	High points	High rebounds	High assists	Location Attendance	Record
5	December 2	@ Aquas	L 93–94	Mohammad Al Bachir Gadiaga (28)	Viktor Gaddefors (16)	Hsieh Ya-Hsuan (7)	Kaohsiung Arena; 8,012	4–1
6	December 3	@ Leopards	L 91–97	Mohammad Al Bachir Gadiaga (25)	Kristijan Krajina (11); Viktor Gaddefors (11)	Mohammad Al Bachir Gadiaga (10)	Taoyuan Arena; 1,826	4–2
7	December 9	GhostHawks	W 88–85	Mohammad Al Bachir Gadiaga (34)	Kristijan Krajina (20)	Kristijan Krajina (5); Hsieh Ya-Hsuan (5)	Xinzhuang Gymnasium; 4,141	5–2
8	December 10	Mars	W 86–85	Hsieh Ya-Hsuan (23)	Viktor Gaddefors (14)	Mohammad Al Bachir Gadiaga (7)	Xinzhuang Gymnasium; 4,280	6–2
9	December 16	Aquas	W 102–100	Dragan Zeković (28)	Kristijan Krajina (10)	Mohammad Al Bachir Gadiaga (7)	Xinzhuang Gymnasium; 4,301	7–2
10	December 17	Leopards	L 100–107	Viktor Gaddefors (21)	Dragan Zeković (12)	Tseng Wen-Ting (8)	Xinzhuang Gymnasium; 4,202	7–3
11	December 23	@ GhostHawks	W 108–91	Viktor Gaddefors (28)	Dragan Zeković (12)	Viktor Gaddefors (8)	Chia Nan University of Pharmacy and Science Shao Tsung Gymnasium; 1,314	8–3

January : 2–2 (home: 0–0; road: 2–2)

Game	Date	Team	Score	High points	High rebounds	High assists	Location Attendance	Record
12	January 7	@ Mars	W 105–91	Mohammad Al Bachir Gadiaga (28)	Viktor Gaddefors (9); Edgaras Želionis (9)	Mohammad Al Bachir Gadiaga (6)	Taipei Heping Basketball Gymnasium; 3,374	9–3
13	January 14	@ Aquas	L 93–99	Tyran De Lattibeaudiere (24)	Tyran De Lattibeaudiere (12)	Kristijan Krajina (8)	Kaohsiung Arena; 5,868	9–4
14	January 20	@ Mars	W 94–75	Mohammad Al Bachir Gadiaga (25)	Dragan Zeković (9)	Hsieh Ya-Hsuan (6)	Taipei Heping Basketball Gymnasium; 4,291	10–4
15	January 21	@ Leopards	L 85–105	Edgaras Želionis (24)	Kristijan Krajina (13)	Mohammad Al Bachir Gadiaga (7)	Taoyuan Arena; 5,515	10–5

February : 0–0 (home: 0–0; road: 0–0)

Game	Date	Team	Score	High points	High rebounds	High assists	Location Attendance	Record
—	February 24	Leopards	Rescheduled to March 3					
—	February 25	Mars	Rescheduled to February 28					
—	February 28	Mars	Rescheduled to April 13					

March : 5–2 (home: 4–1; road: 1–1)

Game	Date	Team	Score	High points	High rebounds	High assists	Location Attendance	Record
16	March 2	Mars	W 87–83	Cody Demps (21)	Mohammad Al Bachir Gadiaga (8); Huang Hung-Han (8)	Mohammad Al Bachir Gadiaga (5); Cody Demps (5)	Xinzhuang Gymnasium; 3,673	11–5
17	March 3	Leopards	W 95–90	Edgaras Želionis (30)	Mohammad Al Bachir Gadiaga (12); Edgaras Želionis (12)	Hsieh Ya-Hsuan (9)	Xinzhuang Gymnasium; 4,562	12–5
18	March 9	GhostHawks	W 85–73	Mohammad Al Bachir Gadiaga (40)	Mohammad Al Bachir Gadiaga (10); Edgaras Želionis (10); Dragan Zeković (10)	Edgaras Želionis (4); Cody Demps (4)	Xinzhuang Gymnasium; 3,726	13–5
19	March 16	@ GhostHawks	W 105–94	Huang Hung-Han (22)	Dragan Zeković (7)	Hsieh Ya-Hsuan (6)	Chia Nan University of Pharmacy and Science Shao Tsung Gymnasium; 1,452	14–5
20	March 23	Leopards	L 97–104	Edgaras Želionis (27)	Edgaras Želionis (16)	Mohammad Al Bachir Gadiaga (5); Wei Chia-Hao (5)	Xinzhuang Gymnasium; 4,029	14–6
21	March 24	Aquas	W 90–87	Edgaras Želionis (24)	Edgaras Želionis (11)	Mohammad Al Bachir Gadiaga (5); Tseng Wen-Ting (5)	Xinzhuang Gymnasium; 4,091	15–6
22	March 30	@ GhostHawks	L 100–113	Mohammad Al Bachir Gadiaga (20)	Edgaras Želionis (12)	Cody Demps (5)	Chia Nan University of Pharmacy and Science Shao Tsung Gymnasium; 1,778	15–7

April : 4–2 (home: 1–2; road: 3–0)

Game	Date	Team	Score	High points	High rebounds	High assists	Location Attendance	Record
23	April 4	Leopards	L 94–104	Mohammad Al Bachir Gadiaga (27)	Edgaras Želionis (14)	Lin Wei-Han (7)	Xinzhuang Gymnasium; 4,190	15–8
24	April 6	@ Aquas	W 108–93	Edgaras Želionis (27)	Edgaras Želionis (13)	Tseng Wen-Ting (5); Cody Demps (5); Lin Wei-Han (5)	Kaohsiung Arena; 6,618	16–8
—	April 13	GhostHawks	Rescheduled to March 9					
25	April 13	Mars	W 88–81	Cody Demps (24)	Edgaras Želionis (9)	Tseng Wen-Ting (9)	Taipei Dome; 15,600	17–8
26	April 14	Mars	L 76–114	Cody Demps (25)	Huang Hung-Han (6); Tseng Wen-Ting (6); Kristijan Krajina (6)	Lin Wei-Han (3)	Taipei Dome; 15,600	17–9
27	April 20	@ GhostHawks	W 91–88	Edgaras Želionis (43)	Edgaras Želionis (13)	Cody Demps (5); Wei Chia-Hao (5)	Chia Nan University of Pharmacy and Science Shao Tsung Gymnasium; 1,355	18–9
28	April 27	@ Aquas	W 121–99	Mohammad Al Bachir Gadiaga (34)	Dragan Zeković (8)	Tseng Wen-Ting (9)	Fengshan Arena; 3,259	19–9

Color： Win Lose Rescheduled
Schedule

=== Regular season note ===
- Due to the 2025 FIBA Asia Cup qualification, the T1 League declared that the games on February 24 and 25 would be rescheduled to March 3 and February 28.
- Due to the second home arena application of New Taipei CTBC DEA, the T1 League declared that the games on February 28 and April 13 would be rescheduled to April 13 and March 9.

== Playoffs ==
=== Game log ===
2024 playoffs game log
Total: 2–3 (home: 1–2; road: 1–1)
Semifinals : 2–3 (home: 1–2; road: 1–1)

Game	Date	Team	Score	High points	High rebounds	High assists	Location Attendance	Series
1	May 4	Mars	L 94–95 (OT)	Edgaras Želionis (28)	Edgaras Želionis (15)	Hsieh Ya-Hsuan (8)	Xinzhuang Gymnasium; 3,183	0–1
2	May 6	Mars	W 95–88	Edgaras Želionis (32)	Edgaras Želionis (11); Cody Demps (11)	Lin Wei-Han (13)	Xinzhuang Gymnasium; 5,057	1–1
3	May 9	@ Mars	L 72–80	Mohammad Al Bachir Gadiaga (23)	Cody Demps (11)	Kristijan Krajina (4); Lin Wei-Han (4)	National Taiwan University Sports Center; 3,326	1–2
4	May 11	@ Mars	W 81–71	Edgaras Želionis (27)	Edgaras Želionis (16)	Mohammad Al Bachir Gadiaga (6)	National Taiwan University Sports Center; 3,775	2–2
5	May 14	Mars	L 91–97	Mohammad Al Bachir Gadiaga (25); Cody Demps (25)	Cody Demps (12)	Tseng Wen-Ting (7)	Xinzhuang Gymnasium; 5,650	2–3

Color： Win Lose
Schedule

== Player statistics ==
Legend
GP	Games played	MPG	Minutes per game	FG%	Field goal percentage
3P%	3-point field goal percentage	FT%	Free throw percentage	RPG	Rebounds per game
APG	Assists per game	SPG	Steals per game	BPG	Blocks per game
PPG	Points per game		Led the league

=== Regular season ===
Player	GP	MPG	PPG	FG%	3P%	FT%	RPG	APG	SPG	BPG
Mohammad Al Bachir Gadiaga	24	39:37	22.5	46.8%	33.5%	75.2%	5.6	4.2	2.2	0.5
Edgaras Želionis	16	31:07	20.1	56.6%	29.7%	67.3%	9.5	1.4	0.9	0.6
Liu Jen-Hao	21	10:14	2.1	31.4%	26.7%	50.0%	0.9	0.6	0.8	0.0
Liu Min-Yan	4	2:37	0.8	50.0%	50.0%	0.0%	0.5	0.3	0.5	0.0
Wei Chia-Hao	27	16:17	3.5	30.5%	22.6%	50.0%	1.3	1.9	1.2	0.1
Kristijan Krajina	16	34:09	15.4	49.0%	32.2%	64.0%	10.1	3.1	0.9	0.4
Hsieh Ya-Hsuan	28	34:14	11.1	40.5%	34.0%	72.7%	4.0	4.2	1.8	0.3
Zhou Cheng-Rui	5	2:22	0.8	40.0%	0.0%	0.0%	0.6	0.2	0.2	0.2
Jonah Morrison	19	14:00	3.8	32.5%	27.1%	87.5%	1.9	0.8	0.2	0.2
Chen Yu-An	2	2:15	0.0	0.0%	0.0%	0.0%	0.0	0.0	0.0	0.0
Lin Wei-Han	4	21:03	9.8	48.1%	45.0%	100.0%	3.0	3.8	0.5	0.0
Viktor Gaddefors^{‡}	12	36:36	17.2	56.2%	21.7%	50.0%	9.4	4.5	1.8	0.3
Huang Hung-Han	26	26:09	5.7	36.5%	22.6%	69.6%	4.2	1.9	1.1	0.3
Tyran De Lattibeaudiere^{≠‡}	3	22:59	15.0	46.9%	27.3%	60.0%	7.0	1.7	2.3	0.3
Dragan Zeković	20	24:25	13.4	44.0%	30.4%	73.3%	6.6	1.1	0.7	0.8
Liu Weir-Chern	3	4:58	1.0	20.0%	20.0%	0.0%	1.0	0.0	0.0	0.0
Tseng Wen-Ting	20	27:13	5.6	36.4%	30.2%	35.3%	3.9	3.9	1.1	0.7
Li Pei-Cheng	10	3:43	0.1	0.0%	0.0%	50.0%	0.1	0.1	0.1	0.1
Cody Demps^{≠}	13	35:24	15.7	41.8%	33.3%	64.6%	5.8	4.3	1.8	0.5

^{‡} Left during the season
^{≠} Acquired during the season

=== Semifinals ===
Player	GP	MPG	PPG	FG%	3P%	FT%	RPG	APG	SPG	BPG
Mohammad Al Bachir Gadiaga	4	40:04	21.0	45.6%	34.3%	83.3%	7.3	3.3	0.5	0.5
Edgaras Želionis	5	39:12	22.2	47.0%	31.3%	69.7%	11.8	1.6	1.2	0.4
Liu Jen-Hao	1	0:20	0.0	0.0%	0.0%	0.0%	0.0	0.0	0.0	0.0
Liu Min-Yan	Did not play									
Wei Chia-Hao	3	14:27	2.0	25.0%	28.6%	0.0%	3.0	1.3	0.3	0.0
Kristijan Krajina	4	26:56	10.3	43.6%	6.7%	66.7%	7.0	1.8	0.8	0.8
Hsieh Ya-Hsuan	5	37:14	11.4	37.3%	32.3%	50.0%	5.2	4.0	3.2	0.4
Zhou Cheng-Rui	Did not play									
Jonah Morrison	1	3:04	0.0	0.0%	0.0%	0.0%	1.0	0.0	0.0	0.0
Chen Yu-An	Did not play									
Lin Wei-Han	4	23:38	5.0	16.7%	16.0%	66.7%	2.0	5.5	1.0	0.0
Huang Hung-Han	5	17:33	2.6	23.8%	20.0%	0.0%	2.2	0.6	1.0	0.2
Dragan Zeković	1	23:04	15.0	50.0%	42.9%	100.0%	2.0	1.0	0.0	0.0
Liu Weir-Chern	Did not play									
Tseng Wen-Ting	5	32:02	4.4	27.6%	27.3%	0.0%	3.4	4.0	0.6	0.2
Li Pei-Cheng	Did not play									
Cody Demps	5	32:28	12.8	32.8%	22.7%	54.3%	10.4	4.0	1.8	0.8

- Reference：

== Transactions ==
=== Overview ===
Players added

Via draft

- Li Pei-Cheng

Via free agency

- Cody Demps
- Viktor Gaddefors
- Huang Hung-Han
- Tyran De Lattibeaudiere
- Dragan Zeković
Players lost

Via free agency

- Kaspars Bērziņš
- Nick King
- Tyran De Lattibeaudiere
- Lee Hsueh-Lin
- Lin Ping-Sheng
- Tung Fang Yi-Kang

Waived

- Viktor Gaddefors

=== Free agency ===
==== Re-signed ====
Date	Player	Contract terms	Ref.
June 21, 2023	Edgaras Želionis	—N/a	
July 24, 2023	Kristijan Krajina	—N/a	

==== Additions ====
Date	Player	Contract terms	Former team	Ref.
July 28, 2023	Viktor Gaddefors	—N/a	(Netherlands) Donar Groningen	
August 1, 2023	Huang Hung-Han	Multi-year contract, worth unknown	(Taiwan) Taoyuan Pauian Pilots	
August 3, 2023	Li Pei-Cheng	—N/a	(Taiwan) FJU	
August 25, 2023	Dragan Zeković	—N/a	(Bulgaria) BC CSKA Sofia	
January 12, 2024	Tyran De Lattibeaudiere	—N/a	(France) Le Mans Sarthe Basket	
February 19, 2024	Cody Demps	—N/a	(Mexico) Abejas de León	

==== Subtractions ====
Date	Player	Reason	New team	Ref.
August 5, 2023	Nick King	Contract expired	(Taiwan) Tainan TSG GhostHawks	
August 15, 2023	Lin Ping-Sheng	Not execute team option	(Taiwan) Taipei Taishin	
August 24, 2023	Tung Fang Yi-Kang	Contract expired	(Taiwan) Yulon Luxgen Dinos	
August 25, 2023	Kaspars Bērziņš	Contract expired	(Latvia) Rīgas Zeļļi	
October 7, 2023	Lee Hsueh-Lin	Contract expired	(Taiwan) Taoyuan Pauian Pilots	
January 12, 2024	Viktor Gaddefors	Contract terminated	(Italy) San Giobbe Basket	
February 29, 2024	Tyran De Lattibeaudiere	Contract expired	(Poland) Legia Warszawa	

== Awards ==
=== Yearly awards ===
Recipient	Award	Ref.
Mohammad Al Bachir Gadiaga	All-T1 League First Team	
Mohammad Al Bachir Gadiaga	All-Defensive First Team	
Mohammad Al Bachir Gadiaga	Most Valuable Player	
Lee Yi-Hua	Coach of the Year	
New Taipei CTBC DEA	Best Home-Court of the Year	

=== MVP of the Month ===
Month	Recipient	Award	Ref.
February & March	Mohammad Al Bachir Gadiaga	February & March MVP of the Month	
