= 2023–24 Kaohsiung Aquas season =

Taiwanese professional basketball season

- President: Hou Chia-Chi
- Head Coach: Brendan Joyce
- Arena: Kaohsiung Arena; Fengshan Arena

T1 League results
- Record: 15–13 (53.6%)
- Place: 3rd
- Playoffs finish: Semifinals (lost to Leopards, 0–3)

Player records
- Points: Mindaugas Kupšas 21.9
- Rebounds: Mindaugas Kupšas 9.9
- Assists: Jason Brickman 12.7

The 2023–24 Kaohsiung Aquas season was the franchise's third season, its third season in the T1 League.

The Aquas were coached by Brendan Joyce in his third year as their head coach.

== Draft ==
Round	Pick	Player	Position(s)	School / club team
1	5	Tang Wei-Chieh	Guard	VMI

- Reference：

== Roster ==
2023–24 Kaohsiung Aquas roster
Players
Coaches

Pos.	No.	Nat.	Name	Ht.	Wt.	Age	From
F	1	(United States)	Perry Jones (I)	2.11 m (6 ft 11 in)	100 kg (220 lb)	32 – 24 September 1991	Baylor
PG	2	(United States)	Shannon Scott (I)	1.87 m (6 ft 2 in)	90 kg (198 lb)	31 – 21 December 1992	Ohio State
PF	3	(Taiwan)	Wang Yung-Cheng	1.96 m (6 ft 5 in)	92 kg (203 lb)	25 – 29 December 1998	NCCU
SG	7	(Taiwan)	Yu Huan-Ya	1.82 m (6 ft 0 in)	80 kg (176 lb)	30 – 30 November 1993	NTNU
SG	8	(Taiwan)	Chiu Tzu-Hsuan	1.90 m (6 ft 3 in)	90 kg (198 lb)	24 – 8 December 1999	ISU
PF	10	(Taiwan)	Hu Long-Mao	1.95 m (6 ft 5 in)	97 kg (214 lb)	31 – 22 December 1992	Chaminade
SF	11	(Taiwan)	Tang Wei-Chieh	1.92 m (6 ft 4 in)	89 kg (196 lb)	24 – 25 September 1999	VMI
SF	12	(Taiwan)	Lin Jen-Hung	1.94 m (6 ft 4 in)	88 kg (194 lb)	30 – 18 December 1993	NTNU
PF	18	(Taiwan)	Wu I-Ping	2.00 m (6 ft 7 in)	90 kg (198 lb)	31 – 29 August 1992	ISU
C	21	(Taiwan)	Lu Wei-Ting	2.00 m (6 ft 7 in)	100 kg (220 lb)	27 – 16 April 1997	ISU
SG	24	(Taiwan)	Su Wen-Ju	1.87 m (6 ft 2 in)	80 kg (176 lb)	26 – 16 October 1997	ISU
SG	28	(Taiwan)	Yu Chun-An (C)	1.89 m (6 ft 2 in)	83 kg (183 lb)	32 – 13 February 1992	NTNU
C	32	(United Kingdom) (Iran)	Aaron Geramipoor (I)	2.13 m (7 ft 0 in)	120 kg (265 lb)	31 – 11 September 1992	Seton Hall
C	49	(Lithuania)	Mindaugas Kupšas (I)	2.17 m (7 ft 1 in)	122 kg (269 lb)	33 – 9 April 1991	LSU
SF	57	(Taiwan)	Wu Siao-Jin	1.90 m (6 ft 3 in)	83 kg (183 lb)	28 – 28 August 1995	NKNU
PG	66	(Taiwan)	Chen Huai-An	1.86 m (6 ft 1 in)	90 kg (198 lb)	27 – 29 April 1997	NTUA
C	85	(Taiwan)	Chin Ming-Ching	1.95 m (6 ft 5 in)	110 kg (243 lb)	29 – 14 November 1994	NTNU

Head coach

- (Australia) Brendan Joyce

Assistant coach(es)

- (Taiwan) Zhu Yong-Hong
- (Taiwan) Yu Chia-Chieh

Athletic trainer(s)

- (Taiwan) Liao Hsuan-Yi

Legend

- (C) Team captain
- (I) Import player
- Injured

- Roster
Updated: May 10, 2024

== Preseason ==
=== Game log ===
2023 preseason game log
Total: 2–0 (home: 1–0; road: 1–0)
Preseason : 2–0 (home: 1–0; road: 1–0)

Game	Date	Team	Score	High points	High rebounds	High assists	Location Attendance	Record
1	October 14	@ Leopards	W 98–94	Perry Jones (24)	Mindaugas Kupšas (7)	Jason Brickman (13)	Xinzhuang Gymnasium; 1,236	1–0
2	October 15	DEA	W 87–80	Jason Brickman (19)	Perry Jones (15)	Jason Brickman (7)	Xinzhuang Gymnasium; 1,932	2–0

Color： Win Lose
Schedule

== Interleague Basketball Games ==
=== Game log ===
Recap

October 21, 2023
14:30 (UTC+8)

Taipei Fubon Braves	98–104	Kaohsiung Aquas

Taichung Intercontinental Basketball Stadium, Taichung City

Recap

October 22, 2023
17:00 (UTC+8)

Formosa Dreamers	87–84	Kaohsiung Aquas

Taichung Intercontinental Basketball Stadium, Taichung City

== Regular season ==
=== Standings ===
Pos	Team	Pld	W	L	PCT	GB	Qualification
1	New Taipei CTBC DEA	28	19	9	.679	—	Advance to semifinals
2	Taiwan Beer Leopards	28	18	10	.643	1	Advance to semifinals
3	Kaohsiung Aquas	28	15	13	.536	4	Advance to semifinals
4	Taipei Mars	28	11	17	.393	8	Advance to semifinals
5	Tainan TSG GhostHawks	28	7	21	.250	12	

Source: T1 League

=== Game log ===
2023–24 regular season game log
Total: 15–13 (home: 9–5; road: 6–8)
October : 0–1 (home: 0–0; road: 0–1)

Game	Date	Team	Score	High points	High rebounds	High assists	Location Attendance	Record
1	October 29	@ DEA	L 77–86	Mindaugas Kupšas (20)	Mindaugas Kupšas (18)	Jason Brickman (5)	Xinzhuang Gymnasium; 4,032	0–1

November : 0–2 (home: 0–0; road: 0–2)

Game	Date	Team	Score	High points	High rebounds	High assists	Location Attendance	Record
2	November 25	@ Leopards	L 95–110	Mindaugas Kupšas (18)	Jason Brickman (7); Hu Long-Mao (7)	Jason Brickman (9)	Taoyuan Arena; 1,023	0–2
3	November 26	@ Mars	L 110–124	Mindaugas Kupšas (24)	Jason Brickman (9)	Jason Brickman (13)	Taipei Heping Basketball Gymnasium; 4,502	0–3

December : 6–2 (home: 3–1; road: 3–1)

Game	Date	Team	Score	High points	High rebounds	High assists	Location Attendance	Record
4	December 2	DEA	W 94–93	Mindaugas Kupšas (29)	Mindaugas Kupšas (15)	Jason Brickman (14)	Kaohsiung Arena; 8,012	1–3
5	December 3	GhostHawks	L 89–98	Mindaugas Kupšas (22)	Mindaugas Kupšas (9)	Jason Brickman (14)	Kaohsiung Arena; 6,237	1–4
6	December 9	Leopards	W 122–104	Hu Long-Mao (33)	Hu Long-Mao (11)	Jason Brickman (20)	Kaohsiung Arena; 6,318	2–4
7	December 10	GhostHawks	W 110–82	Hu Long-Mao (24)	Jason Brickman (8); Hu Long-Mao (8)	Jason Brickman (17)	Kaohsiung Arena; 5,634	3–4
8	December 16	@ DEA	L 100–102	Yu Huan-Ya (32)	Mindaugas Kupšas (9)	Jason Brickman (11)	Xinzhuang Gymnasium; 4,301	3–5
9	December 23	@ Mars	W 114–98	Jason Brickman (31)	Jason Brickman (12)	Jason Brickman (16)	Taipei Heping Basketball Gymnasium; 4,344	4–5
10	December 24	@ GhostHawks	W 98–89	Hu Long-Mao (20)	Hu Long-Mao (13)	Jason Brickman (11)	Chia Nan University of Pharmacy and Science Shao Tsung Gymnasium; 1,331	5–5
11	December 30	@ Mars	W 109–106	Mindaugas Kupšas (29)	Mindaugas Kupšas (12)	Jason Brickman (14)	Taipei Heping Basketball Gymnasium; 3,456	6–5

January : 4–1 (home: 3–1; road: 1–0)

Game	Date	Team	Score	High points	High rebounds	High assists	Location Attendance	Record
12	January 6	Leopards	L 99–103	Jason Brickman (27)	Mindaugas Kupšas (7); Perry Jones (7)	Jason Brickman (11)	Kaohsiung Arena; 5,021	6–6
13	January 7	GhostHawks	W 120–111	Hu Long-Mao (34)	Hu Long-Mao (10); Mindaugas Kupšas (10)	Jason Brickman (13)	Kaohsiung Arena; 5,816	7–6
14	January 12	Mars	W 111–86	Mindaugas Kupšas (30)	Mindaugas Kupšas (18)	Jason Brickman (13)	Kaohsiung Arena; 3,982	8–6
15	January 14	DEA	W 99–93	Jason Brickman (24)	Mindaugas Kupšas (11)	Jason Brickman (11)	Kaohsiung Arena; 5,868	9–6
16	January 27	@ Leopards	W 108–101	Jason Brickman (25)	Mindaugas Kupšas (13)	Jason Brickman (11)	Taoyuan Arena; 6,215	10–6

February : 2–0 (home: 2–0; road: 0–0)

Game	Date	Team	Score	High points	High rebounds	High assists	Location Attendance	Record
17	February 17	Mars	W 98–94	Mindaugas Kupšas (21)	Mindaugas Kupšas (10)	Jason Brickman (13)	Kaohsiung Arena; 6,057	11–6
18	February 18	Leopards	W 118–117	Perry Jones (23); Mindaugas Kupšas (23)	Perry Jones (14); Mindaugas Kupšas (14)	Perry Jones (5); Yu Huan-Ya (5)	Kaohsiung Arena; 6,123	12–6

March : 1–3 (home: 0–0; road: 1–3)

Game	Date	Team	Score	High points	High rebounds	High assists	Location Attendance	Record
19	March 2	@ GhostHawks	L 95–98	Mindaugas Kupšas (31)	Mindaugas Kupšas (10)	Yu Huan-Ya (10)	Chia Nan University of Pharmacy and Science Shao Tsung Gymnasium; 1,688	12–7
20	March 23	@ Mars	L 94–100	Mindaugas Kupšas (26)	Mindaugas Kupšas (14)	Shannon Scott (8)	Taipei Heping Basketball Gymnasium; 4,868	12–8
21	March 24	@ DEA	L 87–90	Mindaugas Kupšas (32)	Shannon Scott (17)	Shannon Scott (8)	Xinzhuang Gymnasium; 4,091	12–9
22	March 31	@ GhostHawks	W 99–92	Mindaugas Kupšas (24)	Mindaugas Kupšas (7); Tang Wei-Chieh (7)	Shannon Scott (14)	Chia Nan University of Pharmacy and Science Shao Tsung Gymnasium; 1,382	13–9

April : 2–4 (home: 1–3; road: 1–1)

Game	Date	Team	Score	High points	High rebounds	High assists	Location Attendance	Record
23	April 6	DEA	L 93–108	Wu Siao-Jin (29)	Hu Long-Mao (9); Mindaugas Kupšas (9)	Shannon Scott (11)	Kaohsiung Arena; 6,618	13–10
24	April 7	Mars	W 107–89	Mindaugas Kupšas (26)	Mindaugas Kupšas (9)	Shannon Scott (12)	Kaohsiung Arena; 5,573	14–10
25	April 13	@ Leopards	L 78–117	Mindaugas Kupšas (15)	Mindaugas Kupšas (11)	Shannon Scott (12)	Taoyuan Arena; 2,567	14–11
—	April 20	@ Leopards	Rescheduled to April 13					
26	April 21	@ GhostHawks	W 86–78	Shannon Scott (18)	Shannon Scott (12)	Shannon Scott (8)	Chia Nan University of Pharmacy and Science Shao Tsung Gymnasium; 1,799	15–11
27	April 27	DEA	L 99–121	Shannon Scott (22)	Shannon Scott (11)	Hu Long-Mao (6)	Fengshan Arena; 3,259	15–12
28	April 28	Leopards	L 109–113	Shannon Scott (27)	Shannon Scott (12); Aaron Geramipoor (12)	Shannon Scott (11)	Fengshan Arena; 4,577	15–13

Color： Win Lose Rescheduled
Schedule

=== Regular season note ===
- Due to the second home arena application of New Taipei CTBC DEA, the T1 League declared that the game on April 20 would be rescheduled to April 13.

== Playoffs ==
=== Game log ===
2024 playoffs game log
Total: 0–3 (home: 0–1; road: 0–2)
Semifinals : 0–3 (home: 0–1; road: 0–2)

Game	Date	Team	Score	High points	High rebounds	High assists	Location Attendance	Series
1	May 5	@ Leopards	L 76–90	Mindaugas Kupšas (19)	Mindaugas Kupšas (12)	Shannon Scott (7)	Taoyuan Arena; 5,515	0–1
2	May 7	@ Leopards	L 98–107	Hu Long-Mao (28)	Mindaugas Kupšas (13)	Shannon Scott (6)	Taoyuan Arena; 2,758	0–2
3	May 10	Leopards	L 111–113 (OT)	Shannon Scott (24)	Aaron Geramipoor (14)	Shannon Scott (11)	Fengshan Arena; 4,123	0–3

Color： Win Lose
Schedule

== Player statistics ==
Legend
GP	Games played	MPG	Minutes per game	FG%	Field goal percentage
3P%	3-point field goal percentage	FT%	Free throw percentage	RPG	Rebounds per game
APG	Assists per game	SPG	Steals per game	BPG	Blocks per game
PPG	Points per game		Led the league

=== Regular season ===
Player	GP	MPG	PPG	FG%	3P%	FT%	RPG	APG	SPG	BPG
Perry Jones	12	22:12	10.8	42.7%	25.0%	66.7%	5.2	1.9	0.4	0.3
Shannon Scott^{≠}	9	40:16	18.9	39.7%	28.4%	87.1%	9.4	9.9	3.6	0.4
Wang Yung-Cheng	2	1:16	0.0	0.0%	0.0%	0.0%	0.0	0.0	0.0	0.0
Jason Brickman	17	41:08	17.9	50.4%	45.1%	86.5%	6.3	12.7	2.0	0.0
Yu Huan-Ya	26	33:13	11.7	41.5%	39.9%	69.4%	2.3	3.1	1.0	0.0
Chiu Tzu-Hsuan	16	26:38	9.3	42.1%	37.3%	57.1%	3.6	1.7	1.3	0.1
Hu Long-Mao	25	32:49	15.3	43.7%	33.3%	71.2%	5.9	2.6	0.7	0.2
Tang Wei-Chieh	18	10:17	3.8	35.8%	0.0%	66.0%	1.9	0.9	0.3	0.2
Lin Jen-Hung	28	25:21	6.8	42.2%	35.1%	40.0%	1.8	2.0	1.0	0.0
Wu I-Ping	22	5:33	1.9	50.0%	35.7%	50.0%	0.6	0.3	0.0	0.0
Lu Wei-Ting	27	10:05	3.2	34.2%	23.3%	68.6%	2.3	0.6	0.3	0.3
Su Wen-Ju	27	8:55	1.8	31.5%	24.2%	60.0%	1.4	0.5	0.4	0.0
Yu Chun-An	16	4:47	0.9	21.7%	25.0%	0.0%	0.4	0.3	0.2	0.1
Aaron Geramipoor	18	20:41	12.4	59.1%	0.0%	63.2%	6.2	1.4	0.8	0.5
Mindaugas Kupšas	27	33:05	21.9	64.5%	25.0%	72.2%	9.9	2.1	0.6	1.7
Wu Siao-Jin	27	11:38	3.3	35.2%	29.1%	72.7%	0.9	0.4	0.1	0.2
Chen Huai-An	15	5:53	1.7	47.6%	41.7%	50.0%	0.7	0.7	0.5	0.0
Chin Ming-Ching	2	1:10	0.0	0.0%	0.0%	0.0%	0.0	0.0	0.5	0.0

^{≠} Acquired during the season

=== Semifinals ===
Player	GP	MPG	PPG	FG%	3P%	FT%	RPG	APG	SPG	BPG
Perry Jones	1	28:23	21.0	43.8%	66.7%	71.4%	6.0	5.0	0.0	3.0
Shannon Scott	3	39:59	20.3	42.9%	28.6%	78.9%	3.3	8.0	3.3	1.0
Wang Yung-Cheng	Did not play									
Yu Huan-Ya	3	39:13	12.0	34.2%	30.0%	100.0%	3.3	4.0	0.7	0.3
Hu Long-Mao	3	35:29	19.0	48.9%	45.0%	50.0%	6.7	1.7	1.3	0.0
Tang Wei-Chieh	2	8:29	2.0	33.3%	0.0%	0.0%	1.5	0.0	0.0	0.0
Lin Jen-Hung	3	31:00	8.3	52.6%	50.0%	50.0%	3.0	1.7	1.0	0.3
Wu I-Ping	1	6:06	0.0	0.0%	0.0%	0.0%	1.0	0.0	0.0	0.0
Lu Wei-Ting	2	9:01	1.5	50.0%	100.0%	0.0%	2.5	1.5	0.0	0.0
Su Wen-Ju	3	14:35	5.0	38.5%	42.9%	100.0%	1.0	0.3	0.7	0.3
Yu Chun-An	1	8:11	2.0	100.0%	0.0%	0.0%	1.0	1.0	0.0	0.0
Aaron Geramipoor	3	26:11	9.3	41.2%	0.0%	0.0%	10.3	2.7	0.3	0.0
Mindaugas Kupšas	2	32:08	15.0	50.0%	0.0%	54.5%	12.5	2.0	0.5	0.5
Wu Siao-Jin	3	8:10	0.0	0.0%	0.0%	0.0%	0.7	0.3	0.7	0.0
Chen Huai-An	2	8:58	1.5	11.1%	20.0%	0.0%	2.0	2.0	1.5	0.0
Chin Ming-Ching	1	1:05	0.0	0.0%	0.0%	0.0%	0.0	0.0	0.0	0.0

- Reference：

== Transactions ==
On March 18, 2024, Jason Brickman was not registered in the 2023–24 T1 League season final rosters.

=== Overview ===
Players added

Via draft

- Tang Wei-Chieh

Via free agency

- Aaron Geramipoor
- Perry Jones
- Shannon Scott
Players lost

Via free agency

- Xavier Alexander
- John Bohannon

=== Free agency ===
==== Re-signed ====
Date	Player	Contract terms	Ref.
August 5, 2023	Jason Brickman	—N/a	
August 6, 2023	Mindaugas Kupšas	—N/a	
August 24, 2023	Wu Siao-Jin	—N/a	
August 27, 2023	Chin Ming-Ching	—N/a	
August 29, 2023	Wu I-Ping	—N/a	

==== Additions ====
Date	Player	Contract terms	Former team	Ref.
August 4, 2023	Tang Wei-Chieh	—N/a	(United States) VMI	
August 10, 2023	Aaron Geramipoor	—N/a	(Taiwan) Taichung Suns	
August 11, 2023	Perry Jones	—N/a	(Puerto Rico) Capitanes de Arecibo	
March 5, 2024	Shannon Scott	—N/a	(Australia) Brisbane Bullets	

==== Subtractions ====
Date	Player	Reason	New team	Ref.
August 8, 2023	John Bohannon	Contract expired	(Mexico) Tijuana Zonkeys	
August 8, 2023	Xavier Alexander	Contract expired	(Indonesia) Tangerang Hawks	

== Awards ==
=== Yearly awards ===
Recipient	Award	Ref.
Jason Brickman	Assists Leader	
Mindaugas Kupšas	Blocks Leader	
Mindaugas Kupšas	All-Defensive First Team	
Mindaugas Kupšas	Defensive Player of the Year	
Hu Long-Mao	All-T1 League First Team	
Hu Long-Mao	All-Defensive First Team	

=== MVP of the Month ===
Month	Recipient	Award	Ref.
December	Hu Long-Mao	December MVP of the Month	
January	Chiu Tzu-Hsuan	January MVP of the Month	

=== Import of the Month ===
Month	Recipient	Award	Ref.
December	Jason Brickman	December Import of the Month	
February & March	Mindaugas Kupšas	February & March Import of the Month	
