= Cody Demps =

American basketball player (born 1993)

No. 93 – Rimini
- Position: Point guard
- League: Serie A2

Personal information
- Born: December 2, 1993 (age 32) Santa Clara County, California, U.S.
- Listed height: 6 ft 4 in (1.93 m)
- Listed weight: 195 lb (88 kg)

Career information
- High school: Pleasant Grove (Elk Grove, California)
- College: Sacramento State (2012–2016)
- NBA draft: 2016: undrafted
- Playing career: 2017–present

Career history
- 2017–2020: Reno Bighorns / Stockton Kings
- 2021: NBA G League Ignite
- 2021–2022: Hapoel Be'er Sheva
- 2022–2023: Toyama Grouses
- 2023: Hapoel Be'er Sheva
- 2023: Abejas de León
- 2024: New Taipei CTBC DEA
- 2024: Elitzur Netanya
- 2024–2026: Hapoel Be'er Sheva
- 2026–present: Rimini
- Stats at Basketball Reference

Cody Cooper Demps (born December 2, 1993) is an American professional basketball player for Rimini of the Italian Serie A2. He played college basketball for the Sacramento State Hornets.

== Early life ==
Demps grew up in the Sacramento, California, suburb of Elk Grove, California, and attended Pleasant Grove High School. He was a two-sport star for the Eagles, as a forward in basketball and in football as Pleasant Grove's starting quarterback. As a senior, Demps completed 67% of his passes for 1,794 yards and 22 touchdowns, and was named the Delta River League's co-Offensive Player of the Year. In basketball, Demps averaged 15.6 points per game, and was named first team All-Metro by the Sacramento Bee.

== College career ==
Demps played four seasons for the Sacramento State Hornets, starting his final three years. He averaged 12 points, 4.5 rebounds, and 4.7 assists per game in his senior season. He finished his collegiate basketball career tied for fourth in school history in starts (86), fifth in games (114) played, and seventh in assists (286).

After finishing two classes short of graduating after his senior year, Demps turned down an offer to play basketball professionally overseas and walked-on to the Hornets football team as a wide receiver while completing his degree in the fall of 2016. In his only season playing college football, Demps caught 15 passes for 158 yards.

== Professional career ==
=== Reno Bighorns/Stockton Kings ===
Demps signed with the Reno Bighorns of the NBA G League on October 30, 2017, following a successful tryout. In his first professional season, Demps averaged 7.4 points and 5.5 rebounds per game.

Following the season, Demps played for the Sacramento Kings Summer League team. He returned to the team, now the Stockton Kings, for a second season. He averaged 11.8 points, 4.8 rebounds, 3.3 assists, and 1.1 steals in 50 games (42 starts) during the regular season.

=== Sacramento Kings ===
Demps was signed by the Sacramento Kings to a 10-day contract on March 22, 2019. The Kings assigned him back to Stockton the next day. He was recalled back to the active roster after Stockton was eliminated in the G League playoffs but did not play in an NBA game before his 10 day contract expired. Following the end of the season, Demps was invited to participate in the 2019 G-League Elite Camp along with other top G League players and college prospects.

Demps was named to the Indiana Pacers roster for the 2019 NBA Summer League. Following the end of Summer League, Demps participated in The Basketball Tournament for Loyalty is Love, a team founded by DeMarcus Cousins.

=== Return to Stockton (2019–2020) ===
Demps returned to the Stockton Kings to begin the 2019–20 G League season. On November 26, 2019, he posted 29 points, seven rebounds and five assists in a win over the Canton Charge. Demps averaged 14.4 points, 5.5 rebounds and 2.6 assists per game.

=== NBA G League Ignite (2021) ===
On November 12, 2020, the NBA G League Ignite signed Demps as a veteran player to mentor the younger prospects. He averaged 5.5 points and 2.6 rebounds per game.

=== Hapoel Be'er Sheva (2021–2022) ===
On August 6, 2021, Demps signed with Hapoel Be'er Sheva of the Israeli Basketball Premier League.

=== New Taipei CTBC DEA (2024) ===
On February 19, 2024, Demps signed with the New Taipei CTBC DEA of the T1 League. On August 10, he left the team.

=== Elitzur Netanya (2024–present) ===
In October 2024, Demps joined the Elitzur Netanya of the Israeli Premier League.

== Personal ==
Demps' father, Chris Demps, played defensive end for Sacramento State's football team.
