= Shannon Scott =

American basketball player (born 1992)

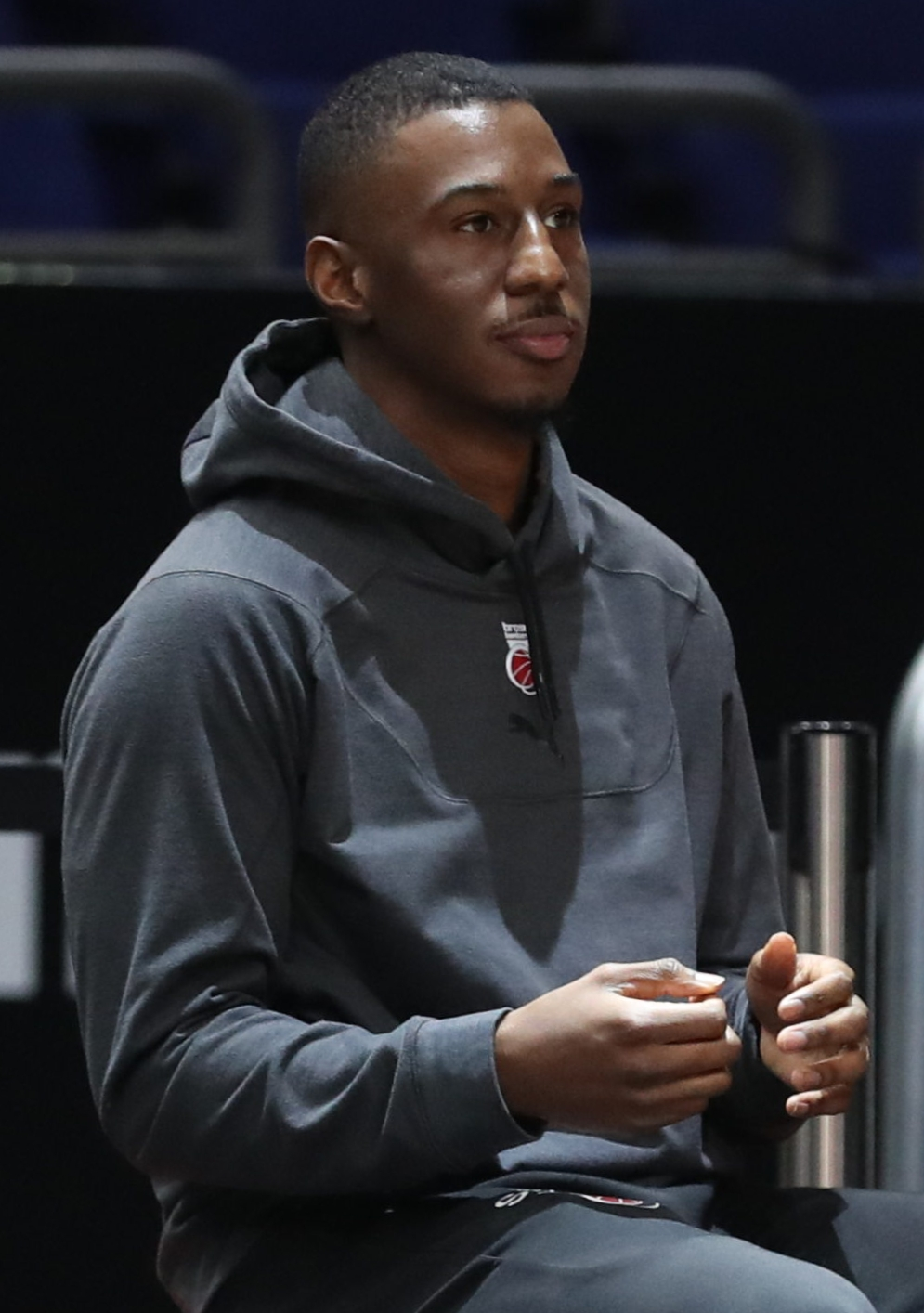
- Scott with Brose Bamberg in 2022

Personal information
- Born: December 21, 1992 (age 33) Alpharetta, Georgia, U.S.
- Listed height: 6 ft 2 in (1.88 m)
- Listed weight: 198 lb (90 kg)

Career information
- High school: Milton (Milton, Georgia)
- College: Ohio State (2011–2015)
- NBA draft: 2015: undrafted
- Playing career: 2015–2024
- Position: Point guard

Career history
- 2015–2016: Raptors 905
- 2016–2017: Doxa Lefkadas
- 2017–2018: Long Island Nets
- 2018: Panteras de Miranda
- 2018–2019: Long Island Nets
- 2019–2020: Juventus Utena
- 2021: Long Island Nets
- 2021–2022: Brose Bamberg
- 2022–2023: Cairns Taipans
- 2023–2024: Brisbane Bullets
- 2024: Kaohsiung Aquas

Career highlights
- Greek League steals leader (2017); 2× Big Ten All-Defensive Team (2013, 2014); McDonald's All-American (2011); Mr. Georgia Basketball (2011)
- Stats at Basketball Reference

Shannon Dean Scott (born December 21, 1992) is an American former professional basketball player. He played college basketball for the Ohio State Buckeyes before playing professionally in the NBA G League, Greece, Venezuela, Lithuania, Germany, and Australia.

== High school career ==
Scott was born in Alpharetta, Georgia. He attended Milton High School in Milton, Georgia, where he averaged 14 points, 4.3 rebounds, 7.4 assists and 2.7 steals as a senior helping the Eagles to a 29–3 record, including 12–0 in the conference. In his final three seasons with Milton, he helped squad go 82–15 with a state title and three championship game appearances. He was named a McDonald's All American in 2011.

== College career ==
As a freshman Scott played 51 games, producing 1.2 points and 1.1 rebounds per game with 36 total assists and played in four NCAA tournament games averaging 11.8 minutes with three assists.

As a sophomore Scott played in all 37 contests, averaging 4.9 points, 3.8 assists and 1.7 steals per game, being second on the team in assists (63) and steals (142).

As a junior Scott saw action in 35 games, with 21 starts. He averaged 7.5 points, 3.4 assists and 2.0 steals. He was named to the Big Ten All-Defensive team.

In his senior season, Scott averaged 8.5 points, 5.9 assists, 1.7 steals and 30.5 minutes in 35 games, all starts, ranking 17th in the nation in assists per game. He posted a career-high 21 points versus Minnesota and 16 assists versus Sacred Heart. He was named to the Honourable Mention All-Big Ten team.

== Professional career ==
=== Raptors 905 (2015–2016) ===
After going undrafted in the 2015 NBA draft, Scott played for the San Antonio Spurs during the 2015 NBA Summer League. After spending pre-season with the Toronto Raptors, he joined Raptors 905 of the NBA Development League as an affiliate player for the 2015–16 season. On March 24, 2016, he recorded the first triple-double in Raptors 905's history with 24 points, 11 rebounds and 11 assists in a 114–113 win over the Westchester Knicks.

In July 2016, Scott played for the Phoenix Suns during the 2016 NBA Summer League.

=== Doxa Lefkadas (2016–2017) ===
On September 28, 2016, Scott signed with Doxa Lefkadas of the Greek Basket League.

=== Long Island Nets and Panteras de Miranda (2017–2019) ===
In November 2017, Scott joined the Long Island Nets of the NBA G League. Following the 2017–18 NBA G League season, he moved to Venezuela for a stint with Panteras de Miranda of the LPB.

After playing for the Charlotte Hornets during the 2018 NBA Summer League, Scott signed with the Brooklyn Nets in October 2018. He was soon waived and subsequently re-joined the Long Island Nets for the 2018–19 NBA G League season.

=== Juventus Utena (2019–2020) ===
On August 8, 2019, Scott signed with Juventus Utena of the Lithuanian Basketball League.

=== Third season with Long Island (2021) ===
Scott again played for the Long Island Nets in the G League hub season between February and March 2021.

=== Brose Bamberg (2021–2022) ===
On October 24, 2021, Scott signed with Brose Bamberg of the Basketball Bundesliga (BBL).

=== Cairns Taipans (2022–2023) ===
On August 12, 2022, Scott signed with the Cairns Taipans in Australia for the 2022–23 NBL season.

=== Brisbane Bullets (2023–2024) ===
On April 28, 2023, Scott signed a two-year deal with the Brisbane Bullets. He was released from the second year of his contract on July 17, 2024.

=== Kaohsiung Aquas (2024) ===
On March 5, 2024, Scott signed with the Kaohsiung Aquas of the T1 League. On July 19, 2024, Kaohsiung Aquas announced that Scott left the team.

On August 27, 2025, Scott announced his retirement from professional basketball.

== Personal life ==
He is the son of Charlie and Trudy Scott and has two siblings, Simone and Shaun. His father played professional basketball in the ABA and NBA after a collegiate career at North Carolina.
