= Jaylen Johnson =

American basketball player (born 1996)

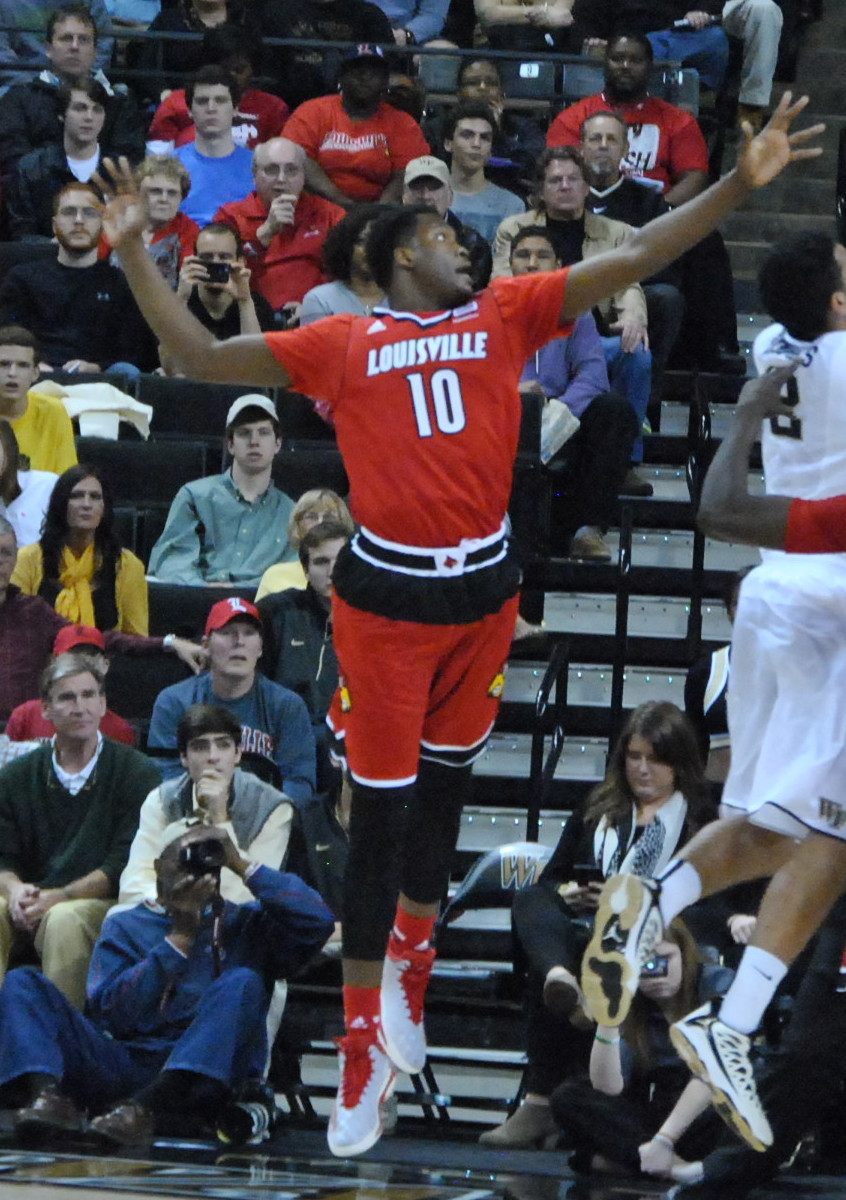
- Johnson playing for Louisville in 2015

No. 5 – Abra Weavers
- Position: Center / Power forward
- League: East Asia Super League

Personal information
- Born: August 7, 1996 (age 30) Ypsilanti, Michigan, U.S.
- Listed height: 6 ft 9 in (2.06 m)
- Listed weight: 230 lb (104 kg)

Career information
- High school: Ypsilanti (Ypsilanti, Michigan)
- College: Louisville (2014–2017)
- NBA draft: 2017: undrafted
- Playing career: 2017–present

Career history
- 2017–2018: Windy City Bulls
- 2019: Iowa Wolves
- 2019: Hapoel Holon
- 2019–2020: Iowa Wolves
- 2021-2023: Motor City Cruise
- 2023: Nacional
- 2023–2024: Taipei Mars
- 2024: Hapoel Haifa
- 2024–2025: Yalovaspor Basketbol
- 2025–2026: Goyang Sono Skygunners
- 2026: Rain or Shine Elasto Painters
- 2026–present: Abra Weavers
- Stats at Basketball Reference

Jaylen Rashawn Ziyad Johnson (born August 7, 1996) is an American professional basketball player for the Abra Weavers of the East Asia Super League (EASL). He played college basketball for the University of Louisville from 2014 to 2017.

== High school career ==
Johnson wrapped up his senior campaign at Ypsilanti High School with averages of 13.6 points, 9.6 rebounds, 5.3 blocks and 4.1 assists per game.

- Produced a triple double of 20 points, 10 rebounds, and 11 assists in the Class A district title game. He grabbed double-digit rebounds in 11 games as a senior.
- A finalist for the Hal Schram Mr. Basketball award in Michigan, Johnson was a first team all-state selection and was the Ann Arbor News Washtenaw County Player of the Year. He was ranked No. 55 nationally by 247Sports.com, 56th by Rivals.com, 62nd by Scout.com and was among the nation's top 25 power forwards by ESPN.
- Averaged 13.8 points and 8.5 rebounds as a junior in helping Ypsilanti to a 20–5 record and the school's first regional championship since 1981. He averaged 19.7 points and 15.3 rebounds in three district games before Ypsilanti reached the state quarterfinals, where Johnson totaled 15 points and 12 boards. He was a first-team all-county selection as a junior.

In 2013, he attended the LeBron James Skills Academy and Adidas Super 64. Johnson attended the Pangos All-American Camp in 2014 and was awarded the Mario Ellie Award and was also named to the "Cream of the Crop" Top 30.

- Produced a double-double for the winning White team in the 2014 Kentucky Derby Festival Basketball Classic all-star game, totaling 14 points, 10 rebounds and two assists.
- Played quarterback early in his prep career.

== College career ==
He joined the Louisville Cardinals men's basketball team for the 2014–15 season. During his three-year tenure with the Cards, Johnson made a total of 88 appearances, starting in 22 games his sophomore season and in 26 as a junior. Johnson averaged 5.2 points and 3.8 rebounds a contest during his Louisville career. His best season came as a junior (2016–17) when he scored 8.0 points a game, while scooping up 5.8 rebounds in 20.5 minutes per game. His per 40 minutes numbers were 15.6 points and 11.3 rebounds. Johnson finished 7th in the ACC and 102nd nationally in offensive rebounds per game.

In late April 2017, he announced his decision to skip his senior year to start his professional career and declare for the 2017 NBA draft. However, he went undrafted.

== Professional career ==
=== Windy City Bulls (2017–2018) ===
After going undrafted in the 2017 NBA draft, Johnson signed a training camp deal with the Chicago Bulls. He was waived on October 14 as one of the final preseason cuts. On November 4, 2017, Johnson was included in opening night roster of the Windy City Bulls. On March 24, 2018, the Chicago Bulls announced that they had signed Johnson, but was waived on the next day.

On October 20, 2018, the Iowa Wolves announced that they had acquired the returning rights to Johnson and Jarell Eddie from the Windy City Bulls for the returning rights to JaKarr Sampson and the draft rights to the No. 38 overall pick in the 2018 NBA G League Draft, Mike Amius.

=== Iowa Wolves (2019) ===
On January 11, 2019, Johnson was added to Iowa Wolves to their roster. In 21 games played for the Wolves, he averaged 8.7 points, 4.3 rebounds and 1 assist per game.

On July 1, 2019, Johnson joined the Indiana Pacers for the 2019 NBA Summer League.

=== Hapoel Holon (2019) ===
On September 4, 2019, Johnson signed with Hapoel Holon of the Israeli Premier League for the 2019–20 season. On November 2, 2019, he parted ways with Holon after appearing in five games.

=== Second stint with Iowa Wolves (2019–2020) ===
On November 20, 2019, the Iowa Wolves announced that they had acquired returning right of Johnson.

On January 5, 2021, Johnson signed with Cherkaski Mavpy, but never played for them and on January 25, he was included in roster of the Iowa Wolves, but was later waived on February 13.

=== Motor City Cruise (2021–2023) ===
In the 2021 NBA G League draft, Johnson was selected with the 8th pick by the Motor City Cruise.

=== Nacional (2023) ===
On March 27, 2023, Johnson signed with Nacional of the Liga Uruguaya de Básquetbol. Johnson help advance Nacional to the championship finals.

=== Taipei Mars (2023–2024) ===
On September 14, 2023, Johnson joined the Taipei Taishin Mars of the T1 League. Jaylen Johnson helps his team to the championship finals. Jaylen Johnson scored 30 pts in loss against Boogie Cousins and The Taiwan Bears in June 2024. He was then drafted by team Bivouac with the Big 3.

=== Bivouac (2024) ===
On May 28, 2024, Johnson was selected by Bivouac in 2024 Big3 draft.

=== Hapoel Hafia (2024) ===
During summer 2024, he signed with Hapoel Haifa of the Israeli Basketball Premier League (ISBL).

=== Yalovaspor Basketbol (2024–2025) ===
On October 22, 2024, he signed with Yalovaspor Basketbol of the Basketbol Süper Ligi (BSL).

=== Rain or Shine Elasto Painters (2026) ===
On February 10, 2026, Johnson signed with the Rain or Shine Elasto Painters of the Philippine Basketball Association (PBA).

=== Abra Weavers (2026–present) ===
In September 2026, Johnson signed with the Maharlika Pilipinas Basketball League (MPBL) champions Abra Weavers for its East Asia Super League (EASL) campaign, which Abra is joining as the Philippines' representative. Because of the MPBL's restrictions on foreign players and players without Filipino descent, Johnson can only play for Abra's EASL games.

== Personal life ==
His mother Janetta played basketball at the University of Wisconsin. She is the first woman to lead the nation in blocked shots (for both men and women). She still holds the single-season record for blocked shots at Wisconsin with 130. She also spent four years playing professionally in Portugal.
