= 2023–24 T1 League regular season =

3rd T1 League regular season

T1 League
- Season: 2023–24
- Duration: October 28, 2023 – April 28, 2024
- Games played: 28 per team
- Teams: 5

Regular season
- Season MVP: Mohammad Al Bachir Gadiaga (DEA)

Statistical leaders
Points	Lasan Kromah (Leopards)	25.7
Rebounds	Devin Williams (Leopards)	16.6
Assists	Jason Brickman (Aquas)	12.7

Records
- Biggest home win: Aquas 78–117 Leopards (April 13, 2024)
- Biggest away win: Mars 114–76 DEA (April 14, 2024)
- Highest scoring: Leopards 96–126 Mars (March 24, 2024)
- Lowest scoring: GhostHawks 70–97 Mars (April 28, 2024)
- Winning streak: 6 game Leopards; Aquas
- Losing streak: 8 game GhostHawks
- All statistics correct as of April 28, 2024.

The 2023–24 T1 League regular season was the third regular season of T1 League. Participating teams included the Kaohsiung Aquas, New Taipei CTBC DEA, Tainan TSG GhostHawks, Taipei Mars, and the Taiwan Beer Leopards. Each team plays against another seven times, led to 28 matches in total. On September 15, 2023, the T1 League announced that the 2023–24 season participation rights of the Taichung Suns was cancelled due to financial qualification. On October 16, the Taichung Suns announced to fold officially. The regular season started on October 28, 2023, and ended on April 28, 2024. The 2023–24 season opening game, matched by the Tainan TSG GhostHawks and the New Taipei CTBC DEA, was played at Xinzhuang Gymnasium.

== League table ==
Pos	Team	Pld	W	L	PCT	GB	Qualification
1	New Taipei CTBC DEA	28	19	9	.679	—	Advance to semifinals
2	Taiwan Beer Leopards	28	18	10	.643	1	Advance to semifinals
3	Kaohsiung Aquas	28	15	13	.536	4	Advance to semifinals
4	Taipei Mars	28	11	17	.393	8	Advance to semifinals
5	Tainan TSG GhostHawks	28	7	21	.250	12	

Source: T1 League

=== Head to head ===
Home \ Away	MARS	DEA	LEOPARDS	GHOSTHAWKS	AQUAS
Taipei Mars	—	0–3	1–2	4–0	2–2
New Taipei CTBC DEA	3–1	—	1–3	3–0	3–0
Taiwan Beer Leopards	2–2	2–1	—	4–0	2–1
Tainan TSG GhostHawks	2–1	1–3	2–1	—	1–3
Kaohsiung Aquas	3–0	2–2	2–2	2–1	—

Source: T1 League
Legend: Blue = home team win; Red = away team win.
Matches with lighter background shading were decided after overtime.

== Matches ==
=== Matchweek 1 (opening match) ===
October 28, 2023 Regular #01	Tainan TSG GhostHawks	92–106	New Taipei CTBC DEA	New Taipei City
14:00 (UTC+8)	Scoring by quarter: 25–26, 29–25, 15–29, 23–26
	Pts: King 25; Rebs: Deguara 19; Asts: Hu Kai-Hsiang 5	boxscore	Pts: Bachir 22; Rebs: three players 7 Asts: Krajina, Gaddefors 7	Arena: Xinzhuang Gymnasium; Attendance: 4,182; Referees: Lan Wei-Hsiung, Hsieh Shang-Chien, Lai Chien-Hao

October 29, 2023 Regular #02	Kaohsiung Aquas	77–86	New Taipei CTBC DEA	New Taipei City
14:00 (UTC+8)	Scoring by quarter: 21–20, 13–19, 19–31, 24–16
	Pts: Kupšas 20; Rebs: Kupšas 18; Asts: Brickman 5	boxscore	Pts: Gaddefors 31; Rebs: Krajina, Gaddefors 11; Asts: Wei Chia-Hao 5	Arena: Xinzhuang Gymnasium; Attendance: 4,032; Referees: Yu Jung, Chen Chien-Lin, Huang Yu-Ming

=== Matchweek 2 ===
November 18, 2023 Regular #03	New Taipei CTBC DEA	87–73	Taiwan Beer Leopards	Taoyuan City
14:00 (UTC+8)	Scoring by quarter: 24–19, 25–25, 12–17, 26–12
	Pts: Bachir 25; Rebs: Krajina, Gaddefors 16; Asts: Gaddefors, Huang Hung-Han 4	boxscore	Pts: Lin Sin-Kuan 16; Rebs: Williams 17; Asts: Gao Jin-Wei, Chiang Yu-An 3	Arena: Taoyuan Arena; Attendance: 2,118; Referees: Yu Jung, Huang Po-Wei, Liu Nai-Wei

November 19, 2023 Regular #04	Taipei Mars	99–102	Taiwan Beer Leopards	Taoyuan City
14:00 (UTC+8)	Scoring by quarter: 24–25, 28–33, 19–22, 28–22
	Pts: Ndoye 32; Rebs: Johnson 16; Asts: Ting Sheng-Ju 7	boxscore	Pts: Kromah 29; Rebs: Williams 14; Asts: Gao Jin-Wei 6	Arena: Taoyuan Arena; Attendance: 1,688; Referees: Ho Chang-Jen, Wu Pei-Jung, Chien Chun-Yen

=== Matchweek 3 ===
November 25, 2023 Regular #05	Kaohsiung Aquas	95–110	Taiwan Beer Leopards	Taoyuan City
14:00 (UTC+8)	Scoring by quarter: 30–28, 21–31, 23–33, 21–18
	Pts: Kupšas 18; Rebs: Brickman, Hu Long-Mao 7 Asts: Brickman 9	boxscore	Pts: Kromah 25; Rebs: Williams 18; Asts: Kromah 10	Arena: Taoyuan Arena; Attendance: 1,023; Referees: Lan Wei-Hsiung, Lai Chien-Hao, Lin Yu-Hsuan

November 25, 2023 Regular #06	New Taipei CTBC DEA	104–79	Taipei Mars	Taipei City
16:30 (UTC+8)	Scoring by quarter: 17–27, 32–14, 25–15, 30–23
	Pts: Bachir 32; Rebs: Gaddefors, Zeković 10; Asts: Gaddefors 7	boxscore	Pts: three players 11; Rebs: Johnson 14; Asts: Johnson 4	Arena: Taipei Heping Basketball Gymnasium; Attendance: 5,700; Referees: Lin Chien-Hung, Hsieh Shang-Chien, Hsieh Chieh-Lung

November 26, 2023 Regular #07	Tainan TSG GhostHawks	112–120	Taiwan Beer Leopards	Taoyuan City
14:00 (UTC+8)	Scoring by quarter: 34–21, 21–39, 28–31, 29–29
	Pts: King 35; Rebs: King 13; Asts: King 10	boxscore	Pts: Kromah 27; Rebs: Williams 16; Asts: Kromah 12	Arena: Taoyuan Arena; Attendance: 1,524; Referees: Chuang Chih-Chun, Huang Po-Wei, Yu Fu-Jung

November 26, 2023 Regular #08	Kaohsiung Aquas	110–124	Taipei Mars	Taipei City
16:30 (UTC+8)	Scoring by quarter: 28–36, 26–35, 25–23, 31–30
	Pts: Kupšas 24; Rebs: Brickman 9 Asts: Brickman 13	boxscore	Pts: Ting Sheng-Ju 27; Rebs: Ndoye 15; Asts: Ting Sheng-Ju 5	Arena: Taipei Heping Basketball Gymnasium; Attendance: 4,502; Referees: Yu Jung, Chen Chien-Lin, Huang Yu-Ming

=== Matchweek 4 ===
December 2, 2023 Regular #09	New Taipei CTBC DEA	93–94	Kaohsiung Aquas	Kaohsiung City
14:00 (UTC+8)	Scoring by quarter: 32–21, 31–19, 15–25, 15–29
	Pts: Bachir 28; Rebs: Gaddefors 16; Asts: Hsieh Ya-Hsuan 7	boxscore	Pts: Kupšas 29; Rebs: Kupšas 15; Asts: Brickman 14	Arena: Kaohsiung Arena; Attendance: 8,012; Referees: Yu Jung, Liu Nai-Wei, Lin Tsung-Yun

December 2, 2023 Regular #10	Taipei Mars	111–104	Taiwan Beer Leopards	Taoyuan City
16:30 (UTC+8)	Scoring by quarter: 33–25, 27–20, 24–20, 27–39
	Pts: Ndoye 31; Rebs: Johnson 14; Asts: Ting Sheng-Ju 13	boxscore	Pts: Kromah 36; Rebs: Hamilton, Kromah 16; Asts: Gao Jin-Wei 7	Arena: Taoyuan Arena; Attendance: 1,987; Referees: Lin Chien-Hung, Chien Chun-Yen, Hsieh Chieh-Lung

December 3, 2023 Regular #11	Tainan TSG GhostHawks	98–89	Kaohsiung Aquas	Kaohsiung City
14:00 (UTC+8)	Scoring by quarter: 25–27, 21–22, 23–23, 29–17
	Pts: King 33; Rebs: Bhullar 12; Asts: King 8	boxscore	Pts: Kupšas 22; Rebs: Kupšas 9 Asts: Brickman 14	Arena: Kaohsiung Arena; Attendance: 6,237; Referees: Ho Chang-Jen, Wu Pei-Jung, Hou Chun-Jen

December 3, 2023 Regular #12	New Taipei CTBC DEA	91–97	Taiwan Beer Leopards	Taoyuan City
16:30 (UTC+8)	Scoring by quarter: 25–26, 17–20, 25–20, 24–31
	Pts: Bachir 25; Rebs: Krajina, Gaddefors 11; Asts: Bachir 10	boxscore	Pts: Kromah 21; Rebs: Williams 15; Asts: Kromah 7	Arena: Taoyuan Arena; Attendance: 1,826; Referees: Lan Wei-Hsiung, Chen Chien-Lin, Huang Yu-Ming

=== Matchweek 5 ===
December 9, 2023 Regular #13	Tainan TSG GhostHawks	85–88	New Taipei CTBC DEA	New Taipei City
14:00 (UTC+8)	Scoring by quarter: 19–27, 28–32, 12–13, 26–16
	Pts: Bhullar 27; Rebs: King 15; Asts: Li Han-Sheng, King 4	boxscore	Pts: Bachir 34; Rebs: Krajina 20; Asts: Krajina, Hsieh Ya-Hsuan 5	Arena: Xinzhuang Gymnasium; Attendance: 4,141; Referees: Yu Jung, Hsieh Shang-Chien, Chien Chun-Yen

December 9, 2023 Regular #14	Taiwan Beer Leopards	104–122	Kaohsiung Aquas	Kaohsiung City
16:30 (UTC+8)	Scoring by quarter: 23–37, 34–24, 28–27, 19–34
	Pts: Kromah 30; Rebs: Williams 25; Asts: Kromah 7	boxscore	Pts: Hu Long-Mao 33; Rebs: Hu Long-Mao 11; Asts: Brickman 20	Arena: Kaohsiung Arena; Attendance: 6,318; Referees: Lai Chien-Hao, Huang Po-Wei, Liu Nai-Wei

December 10, 2023 Regular #15	Taipei Mars	85–86	New Taipei CTBC DEA	New Taipei City
14:00 (UTC+8)	Scoring by quarter: 24–21, 20–25, 21–20, 20–20
	Pts: McCree 36; Rebs: McCree, Ndoye 15; Asts: Ting Sheng-Ju 5	boxscore	Pts: Hsieh Ya-Hsuan 23; Rebs: Gaddefors 14; Asts: Bachir 7	Arena: Xinzhuang Gymnasium; Attendance: 4,280; Referees: Chuang Chih-Chun, Lin Yu-Hsuan, Tsai Tsung-Ting

December 10, 2023 Regular #16	Tainan TSG GhostHawks	82–110	Kaohsiung Aquas	Kaohsiung City
16:30 (UTC+8)	Scoring by quarter: 22–26, 18–30, 24–14, 18–40
	Pts: King 18; Rebs: Bhullar 12; Asts: King 5	boxscore	Pts: Hu Long-Mao 24; Rebs: Brickman, Hu Long-Mao 8 Asts: Brickman 17	Arena: Kaohsiung Arena; Attendance: 5,634; Referees: Lin Chien-Hung, Lan Wei-Hsiung, Hsieh Shang-Chien

=== Matchweek 6 ===
December 16, 2023 Regular #17	Taiwan Beer Leopards	97–108	Tainan TSG GhostHawks	Tainan City
14:00 (UTC+8)	Scoring by quarter: 37–24, 18–39, 25–24, 17–21
	Pts: Kromah 34; Rebs: Williams, Hamilton 14; Asts: Chiang Yu-An 8	boxscore	Pts: King 23; Rebs: King 13; Asts: King 11	Arena: Chia Nan University of Pharmacy and Science Shao Tsung Gymnasium; Attendance: 2,038; Referees: Ho Chang-Jen, Huang Po-Wei, Hou Chun-Jen

December 16, 2023 Regular #18	Kaohsiung Aquas	100–102	New Taipei CTBC DEA	New Taipei City
16:30 (UTC+8)	Scoring by quarter: 27–16, 19–26, 28–24, 26–36
	Pts: Yu Huan-Ya 32; Rebs: Kupšas 9 Asts: Brickman 11	boxscore	Pts: Zeković 28; Rebs: Krajina 10; Asts: Bachir 7	Arena: Xinzhuang Gymnasium; Attendance: 4,301; Referees: Chung Yi-Chih, Lin Chien-Hung, Liu Nai-Wei

December 17, 2023 Regular #19	Taipei Mars	90–112	Tainan TSG GhostHawks	Tainan City
14:00 (UTC+8)	Scoring by quarter: 19–37, 23–26, 20–26, 28–23
	Pts: Ndoye 20; Rebs: McCree 12; Asts: Lin Ping-Sheng 6	boxscore	Pts: King 38; Rebs: King 9 Asts: King 10	Arena: Chia Nan University of Pharmacy and Science Shao Tsung Gymnasium; Attendance: 1,666; Referees: Lan Wei-Hsiung, Lai Chien-Hao, Wu Pei-Jung

December 17, 2023 Regular #20	Taiwan Beer Leopards	107–100	New Taipei CTBC DEA	New Taipei City
16:30 (UTC+8)	Scoring by quarter: 28–32, 28–19, 27–17, 24–32
	Pts: Gao Jin-Wei 30; Rebs: Williams 23; Asts: Kromah 10	boxscore	Pts: Gaddefors 21; Rebs: Zeković 12; Asts: Tseng Wen-Ting 8	Arena: Xinzhuang Gymnasium; Attendance: 4,202; Referees: Chuang Chih-Chun, Yu Fu-Jung, Tsai Tsung-Ting

=== Matchweek 7 ===
December 23, 2023 Regular #21	Kaohsiung Aquas	114–98	Taipei Mars	Taipei City
14:00 (UTC+8)	Scoring by quarter: 30–20, 25–25, 31–26, 28–27
	Pts: Brickman 31; Rebs: Brickman 12; Asts: Brickman 16	boxscore	Pts: McCree 25; Rebs: Johnson 11; Asts: Ting Sheng-Ju 7	Arena: Taipei Heping Basketball Gymnasium; Attendance: 4,344; Referees: Yu Jung, Huang Po-Wei, Hsieh Shang-Chien

December 23, 2023 Regular #22	New Taipei CTBC DEA	108–91	Tainan TSG GhostHawks	Tainan City
16:30 (UTC+8)	Scoring by quarter: 29–25, 26–22, 31–29, 22–15
	Pts: Gaddefors 28; Rebs: Zeković 12; Asts: Gaddefors 8	boxscore	Pts: King 24; Rebs: King 14; Asts: Ku Mao Wei-Chia 6	Arena: Chia Nan University of Pharmacy and Science Shao Tsung Gymnasium; Attendance: 1,314; Referees: Lin Chien-Hung, Liu Nai-Wei, Lai Chien-Hao

December 24, 2023 Regular #23	Taiwan Beer Leopards	109–102	Taipei Mars	Taipei City
14:00 (UTC+8)	Scoring by quarter: 19–21, 33–26, 34–27, 23–28
	Pts: Kromah 25; Rebs: Williams 22; Asts: Kromah 11	boxscore	Pts: McCree 26; Rebs: Pippen 14; Asts: Ting Sheng-Ju, Lin Ping-Sheng 5	Arena: Taipei Heping Basketball Gymnasium; Attendance: 4,588; Referees: Chung Yi-Chih, Wu Pei-Jung, Hsieh Chieh-Lung

December 24, 2023 Regular #24	Kaohsiung Aquas	98–89	Tainan TSG GhostHawks	Tainan City
16:30 (UTC+8)	Scoring by quarter: 26–22, 20–21, 26–28, 26–18
	Pts: Hu Long-Mao 20; Rebs: Hu Long-Mao 13; Asts: Brickman 11	boxscore	Pts: Deguara 19; Rebs: Bhullar 17; Asts: Bhullar 4	Arena: Chia Nan University of Pharmacy and Science Shao Tsung Gymnasium; Attendance: 1,331; Referees: Chen Chien-Lin, Yu Fu-Jung, Lin Tsung-Yun

=== Matchweek 8 ===
December 30, 2023 Regular #25	Kaohsiung Aquas	109–106	Taipei Mars	Taipei City
14:00 (UTC+8)	Scoring by quarter: 28–24, 22–30, 32–20, 27–32
	Pts: Kupšas 29; Rebs: Kupšas 12; Asts: Brickman 14	boxscore	Pts: Johnson 33; Rebs: McCree 15; Asts: McCree, Ting Sheng-Ju 6	Arena: Taipei Heping Basketball Gymnasium; Attendance: 3,456; Referees: Lan Wei-Hsiung, Huang Yu-Ming, Hsieh Shang-Chien

December 31, 2023 Regular #26	Taiwan Beer Leopards	120–113	Taipei Mars	Taipei City
14:00 (UTC+8)	Scoring by quarter: 28–32, 35–31, 27–22, 30–28
	Pts: Williams 32; Rebs: Williams 11; Asts: Gao Jin-Wei 9	boxscore	Pts: McCree 27; Rebs: Ndoye 11; Asts: McCree, Lin Ping-Sheng 5	Arena: Taipei Heping Basketball Gymnasium; Attendance: 3,663; Referees: Yu Jung, Lai Chien-Hao, Lin Yu-Hsuan

=== Matchweek 9 ===
January 6, 2024 Regular #27	Tainan TSG GhostHawks	112–119	Taipei Mars	Taipei City
14:00 (UTC+8)	Scoring by quarter: 28–32, 29–31, 30–23, 25–33
	Pts: King 31; Rebs: King 16; Asts: Li Han-Sheng 7	boxscore	Pts: McCree 31; Rebs: Johnson 13; Asts: McCree 4	Arena: Taipei Heping Basketball Gymnasium; Attendance: 2,672; Referees: Yu Jung, Chien Chun-Yen, Liu Nai-Wei

January 6, 2024 Regular #28	Taiwan Beer Leopards	103–99	Kaohsiung Aquas	Kaohsiung City
16:30 (UTC+8)	Scoring by quarter: 24–21, 22–25, 31–18, 26–35
	Pts: Williams 28; Rebs: Williams 25; Asts: Gao Jin-Wei 6	boxscore	Pts: Brickman 27; Rebs: Kupšas, Jones 7 Asts: Brickman 11	Arena: Kaohsiung Arena; Attendance: 5,021; Referees: Lan Wei-Hsiung, Huang Po-Wei, Wu Pei-Jung

January 7, 2024 Regular #29	New Taipei CTBC DEA	105–91	Taipei Mars	Taipei City
14:00 (UTC+8)	Scoring by quarter: 24–22, 29–31, 23–16, 29–22
	Pts: Bachir 28; Rebs: Gaddefors, Želionis 9 Asts: Bachir 6	boxscore	Pts: Johnson 24; Rebs: Pippen, Chen Wen-Hung 8 Asts: Ting Sheng-Ju 6	Arena: Taipei Heping Basketball Gymnasium; Attendance: 3,374; Referees: Chuang Chih-Chun, Chen Chien-Lin, Tsai Tsung-Ting

January 7, 2024 Regular #30	Tainan TSG GhostHawks	111–120	Kaohsiung Aquas	Kaohsiung City
16:30 (UTC+8)	Scoring by quarter: 23–30, 25–31, 31–26, 32–33
	Pts: King 34; Rebs: Bjelica 10; Asts: King 8	boxscore	Pts: Hu Long-Mao 34; Rebs: Hu Long-Mao, Kupšas 10; Asts: Brickman 13	Arena: Kaohsiung Arena; Attendance: 5,816; Referees: Lin Chien-Hung, Hsieh Shang-Chien, Hsieh Chieh-Lung

=== Matchweek 10 ===
January 12, 2024 Regular #31	Taipei Mars	86–111	Kaohsiung Aquas	Kaohsiung City
19:00 (UTC+8)	Scoring by quarter: 19–32, 21–19, 27–32, 19–28
	Pts: three players 19; Rebs: Johnson 9 Asts: Tsao Xun-Xiang 5	boxscore	Pts: Kupšas 30; Rebs: Kupšas 18; Asts: Brickman 13	Arena: Kaohsiung Arena; Attendance: 3,982; Referees: Ho Chang-Jen, Lai Chien-Hao, Hou Chun-Jen

January 14, 2024 Regular #32	New Taipei CTBC DEA	93–99	Kaohsiung Aquas	Kaohsiung City
14:00 (UTC+8)	Scoring by quarter: 15–39, 23–24, 30–17, 25–19
	Pts: Lattibeaudiere 24; Rebs: Lattibeaudiere 12; Asts: Krajina 8	boxscore	Pts: Brickman 24; Rebs: Kupšas 11; Asts: Brickman 11	Arena: Kaohsiung Arena; Attendance: 5,868; Referees: Lan Wei-Hsiung, Huang Po-Wei, Yu Fu-Jung

=== Matchweek 11 ===
January 20, 2024 Regular #33	Tainan TSG GhostHawks	90–119	Taiwan Beer Leopards	Taoyuan City
14:00 (UTC+8)	Scoring by quarter: 17–30, 22–30, 24–25, 27–34
	Pts: three players 15; Rebs: Deguara 13; Asts: King, Ku Mao Wei-Chia 7	boxscore	Pts: Kromah 29; Rebs: Kromah 11; Asts: Kromah 13	Arena: Taoyuan Arena; Attendance: 6,015; Referees: Yu Jung, Lai Chien-Hao, Huang Yu-Ming

January 20, 2024 Regular #34	New Taipei CTBC DEA	94–75	Taipei Mars	Taipei City
16:30 (UTC+8)	Scoring by quarter: 26–12, 19–28, 24–17, 25–18
	Pts: Bachir 25; Rebs: Zeković 9 Asts: Hsieh Ya-Hsuan 6	boxscore	Pts: Ndoye 21; Rebs: Ndoye 10; Asts: Tsao Xun-Xiang 5	Arena: Taipei Heping Basketball Gymnasium; Attendance: 4,291; Referees: Chuang Chih-Chun, Chen Chien-Lin, Lin Yu-Hsuan

January 21, 2024 Regular #35	Tainan TSG GhostHawks	99–107	Taipei Mars	Taipei City
16:30 (UTC+8)	Scoring by quarter: 22–26, 22–20, 19–28, 36–33
	Pts: King 26; Rebs: King 15; Asts: King 8	boxscore	Pts: Ndoye 26; Rebs: Johnson 12; Asts: Tsao Xun-Xiang 7	Arena: Taipei Heping Basketball Gymnasium; Attendance: 3,509; Referees: Ho Chang-Jen, Hsieh Shang-Chien, Lin Tsung-Yun

January 21, 2024 Regular #36	New Taipei CTBC DEA	85–105	Taiwan Beer Leopards	Taoyuan City
19:00 (UTC+8)	Scoring by quarter: 25–37, 22–20, 16–27, 22–21
	Pts: Želionis 24; Rebs: Krajina 13; Asts: Bachir 7	boxscore	Pts: Cousins 25; Rebs: Cousins 17; Asts: Kromah 8	Arena: Taoyuan Arena; Attendance: 5,515; Referees: Lin Chien-Hung, Huang Yu-Ming, Hsieh Chieh-Lung

=== Matchweek 12 ===
January 27, 2024 Regular #37	Kaohsiung Aquas	108–101	Taiwan Beer Leopards	Taoyuan City
16:30 (UTC+8)	Scoring by quarter: 27–22, 34–30, 30–20, 17–29
	Pts: Brickman 25; Rebs: Kupšas 13; Asts: Brickman 11	boxscore	Pts: Kromah 26; Rebs: Cousins 15; Asts: Gao Jin-Wei 9	Arena: Taoyuan Arena; Attendance: 6,215; Referees: Lan Wei-Hsiung, Wu Pei-Jung, Huang Yu-Ming

January 28, 2024 Regular #38	Tainan TSG GhostHawks	88–114	Taiwan Beer Leopards	Taoyuan City
16:30 (UTC+8)	Scoring by quarter: 21–31, 16–20, 22–37, 29–26
	Pts: King 22; Rebs: King 14; Asts: King 9	boxscore	Pts: Cousins 30; Rebs: Williams 33; Asts: Cousins 5	Arena: Taoyuan Arena; Attendance: 6,125; Referees: Yu Jung, Huang Po-Wei, Liu Nai-Wei

=== Matchweek 13 ===
February 17, 2024 Regular #39	Taipei Mars	94–98	Kaohsiung Aquas	Kaohsiung City
19:00 (UTC+8)	Scoring by quarter: 17–33, 31–23, 19–20, 27–22
	Pts: Hollis-Jefferson 34; Rebs: Hollis-Jefferson 7 Asts: Chen Wen-Hung, Hollis-Jefferson 5	boxscore	Pts: Kupšas 21; Rebs: Kupšas 10; Asts: Brickman 13	Arena: Kaohsiung Arena; Attendance: 6,057; Referees: Lai Chien-Hao, Hsieh Shang-Chien, Huang Po-Wei

February 18, 2024 Regular #40	Taiwan Beer Leopards	117–118	Kaohsiung Aquas	Kaohsiung City
18:00 (UTC+8)	Scoring by quarter: 30–23, 26–30, 25–33, 36–32
	Pts: Chiang Yu-An 25; Rebs: Williams 13; Asts: Kromah 8	boxscore	Pts: Jones, Kupšas 23; Rebs: Jones, Kupšas 14; Asts: Jones, Yu Huan-Ya 5	Arena: Kaohsiung Arena; Attendance: 6,123; Referees: Yu Jung, Chien Chun-Yen, Liu Nai-Wei

=== Matchweek 14 ===
February 24, 2024 Regular #41	Tainan TSG GhostHawks	89–96	Taipei Mars	Taipei City
14:00 (UTC+8)	Scoring by quarter: 22–30, 33–19, 16–27, 18–20
	Pts: Mockevičius 20; Rebs: Mockevičius 13; Asts: Li Han-Sheng 9	boxscore	Pts: Ndoye 22; Rebs: Ndoye 19; Asts: Tsao Xun-Xiang 7	Arena: Taipei Heping Basketball Gymnasium; Attendance: 4,280; Referees: Chen Chien-Lin, Huang Yu-Ming, Hsieh Chieh-Lung

Rescheduled (Note: The match, originally scheduled for February 24, 2024, was rescheduled to March 3, 2024 due to the 2025 FIBA Asia Cup qualification.) Regular #42	Taiwan Beer Leopards	vs.	New Taipei CTBC DEA	New Taipei City
	Scoring by quarter: –, –, –, –
		boxscore		Arena: Xinzhuang Gymnasium

Rescheduled (Note: The match, originally scheduled for February 25, 2024, was rescheduled to February 28, 2024 due to the 2025 FIBA Asia Cup qualification.) Regular #43	Taipei Mars	vs.	New Taipei CTBC DEA	New Taipei City
	Scoring by quarter: –, –, –, –
		boxscore		Arena: Xinzhuang Gymnasium

Rescheduled (Note: The match, originally scheduled for February 28, 2024, was rescheduled to April 13, 2024 due to the second home arena application of New Taipei CTBC DEA.) Regular #43	Taipei Mars	vs.	New Taipei CTBC DEA	New Taipei City
	Scoring by quarter: –, –, –, –
		boxscore		Arena: Xinzhuang Gymnasium

=== Matchweek 15 ===
March 2, 2024 Regular #44	Taipei Mars	83–87	New Taipei CTBC DEA	New Taipei City
14:00 (UTC+8)	Scoring by quarter: 27–25, 21–25, 18–17, 17–20
	Pts: Lin Ping-Sheng 20; Rebs: Johnson 17; Asts: Johnson 7	boxscore	Pts: Demps 21; Rebs: Bachir, Huang Hung-Han 8 Asts: Bachir, Demps 5	Arena: Xinzhuang Gymnasium; Attendance: 3,673; Referees: Chung Yi-Chih, Wu Pei-Jung, Yu Fu-Jung

March 2, 2024 Regular #45	Kaohsiung Aquas	95–98	Tainan TSG GhostHawks	Tainan City
16:30 (UTC+8)	Scoring by quarter: 26–29, 28–28, 27–22, 14–19
	Pts: Kupšas 31; Rebs: Kupšas 10; Asts: Yu Huan-Ya 10	boxscore	Pts: King 34; Rebs: Mockevičius 13; Asts: King 5	Arena: Chia Nan University of Pharmacy and Science Shao Tsung Gymnasium; Attendance: 1,688; Referees: Lan Wei-Hsiung, Lai Chien-Hao, Liu Nai-Wei

March 3, 2024 Regular #42	Taiwan Beer Leopards	90–95	New Taipei CTBC DEA	New Taipei City
14:00 (UTC+8)	Scoring by quarter: 15–27, 31–25, 16–17, 28–26
	Pts: Williams 28; Rebs: Williams 18; Asts: Kromah 6	boxscore	Pts: Želionis 30; Rebs: Bachir, Želionis 12; Asts: Hsieh Ya-Hsuan 9	Arena: Xinzhuang Gymnasium; Attendance: 4,562; Referees: Lin Chien-Hung, Chen Chien-Lin, Hsieh Shang-Chien

March 3, 2024 Regular #46	Taipei Mars	92–90	Tainan TSG GhostHawks	Tainan City
16:30 (UTC+8)	Scoring by quarter: 27–24, 26–26, 18–19, 21–21
	Pts: Hollis-Jefferson 21; Rebs: Koreniuk 14; Asts: Chen Wen-Hung, Tsao Xun-Xiang 4	boxscore	Pts: King 26; Rebs: King, Bjelica 9 Asts: Ku Mao Wei-Chia 6	Arena: Chia Nan University of Pharmacy and Science Shao Tsung Gymnasium; Attendance: 1,664; Referees: Yu Jung, Huang Po-Wei, Lin Tsung-Yun

=== Matchweek 16 ===
March 9, 2024 Regular #60	Tainan TSG GhostHawks	73–85	New Taipei CTBC DEA	New Taipei City
14:00 (UTC+8)	Scoring by quarter: 19–22, 18–15, 21–35, 15–13
	Pts: Lu Kuan-Ting 15; Rebs: Vuković 16; Asts: King 5	boxscore	Pts: Bachir 40; Rebs: three players 10; Asts: Želionis, Demps 4	Arena: Xinzhuang Gymnasium; Attendance: 3,726; Referees: Chuang Chih-Chun, Ho Chang-Jen, Hou Chun-Jen

=== Matchweek 17 ===
March 16, 2024 Regular #47	New Taipei CTBC DEA	105–94	Tainan TSG GhostHawks	Tainan City
14:00 (UTC+8)	Scoring by quarter: 29–21, 34–30, 26–23, 16–20
	Pts: Huang Hung-Han 22; Rebs: Zeković 7 Asts: Hsieh Ya-Hsuan 6	boxscore	Pts: King 21; Rebs: Vuković 13; Asts: Li Han-Sheng 5	Arena: Chia Nan University of Pharmacy and Science Shao Tsung Gymnasium; Attendance: 1,452; Referees: Lin Chien-Hung, Hsieh Shang-Chien, Tsai Tsung-Ting

March 17, 2024 Regular #48	Taiwan Beer Leopards	93–108	Tainan TSG GhostHawks	Tainan City
14:00 (UTC+8)	Scoring by quarter: 23–38, 23–29, 20–20, 27–21
	Pts: Williams 25; Rebs: Williams 18; Asts: Gao Jin-Wei 5	boxscore	Pts: Vuković 22; Rebs: Mockevičius 17; Asts: Li Han-Sheng 7	Arena: Chia Nan University of Pharmacy and Science Shao Tsung Gymnasium; Attendance: 1,568; Referees: Lan Wei-Hsiung, Lai Chien-Hao, Liu Nai-Wei

=== Matchweek 18 ===
March 23, 2024 Regular #49	Kaohsiung Aquas	94–100	Taipei Mars	Taipei City
14:00 (UTC+8)	Scoring by quarter: 23–30, 29–19, 22–16, 20–35
	Pts: Kupšas 26; Rebs: Kupšas 14; Asts: Scott 8	boxscore	Pts: Lin Ping-Sheng 25; Rebs: Ndoye 18; Asts: Lin Ping-Sheng 6	Arena: Taipei Heping Basketball Gymnasium; Attendance: 4,868; Referees: Lin Chien-Hung, Wu Pei-Jung, Huang Yu-Ming

March 23, 2024 Regular #50	Taiwan Beer Leopards	104–97	New Taipei CTBC DEA	New Taipei City
16:30 (UTC+8)	Scoring by quarter: 28–17, 23–31, 25–22, 28–27
	Pts: Kromah 27; Rebs: Kromah 10; Asts: Gao Jin-Wei 9	boxscore	Pts: Želionis 27; Rebs: Želionis 16; Asts: Bachir, Wei Chia-Hao 5	Arena: Xinzhuang Gymnasium; Attendance: 4,029; Referees: Yu Jung, Chen Chien-Lin, Hsieh Chieh-Lung

March 24, 2024 Regular #51	Kaohsiung Aquas	87–90	New Taipei CTBC DEA	New Taipei City
16:30 (UTC+8)	Scoring by quarter: 26–33, 24–21, 13–13, 24–23
	Pts: Kupšas 32; Rebs: Scott 17; Asts: Scott 8	boxscore	Pts: Želionis 24; Rebs: Želionis 11; Asts: Bachir, Tseng Wen-Ting 5	Arena: Xinzhuang Gymnasium; Attendance: 4,091; Referees: Lin Chien-Hung, Chen Chien-Lin, Huang Yu-Ming

March 24, 2024 Regular #52	Taiwan Beer Leopards	96–126	Taipei Mars	Taipei City
19:00 (UTC+8)	Scoring by quarter: 25–36, 27–32, 18–29, 26–29
	Pts: Gao Jin-Wei 26; Rebs: Williams 12; Asts: Kromah 8	boxscore	Pts: Hollis-Jefferson 22; Rebs: Ndoye 12; Asts: Tsao Xun-Xiang 13	Arena: Taipei Heping Basketball Gymnasium; Attendance: 4,672; Referees: Yu Jung, Lan Wei-Hsiung, Chien Chun-Yen

=== Matchweek 19 ===
March 30, 2024 Regular #53	New Taipei CTBC DEA	100–113	Tainan TSG GhostHawks	Tainan City
14:00 (UTC+8)	Scoring by quarter: 23–33, 27–29, 25–35, 25–16
	Pts: Bachir 20; Rebs: Želionis 12; Asts: Demps 5	boxscore	Pts: King 31; Rebs: Mockevičius 14; Asts: Ku Mao Wei-Chia 6	Arena: Chia Nan University of Pharmacy and Science Shao Tsung Gymnasium; Attendance: 1,778; Referees: Lai Chien-Hao, Hsieh Shang-Chien, Huang Po-Wei

March 31, 2024 Regular #54	Kaohsiung Aquas	99–92	Tainan TSG GhostHawks	Tainan City
14:00 (UTC+8)	Scoring by quarter: 18–33, 23–15, 32–21, 26–23
	Pts: Kupšas 24; Rebs: Kupšas, Tang Wei-Chieh 7 Asts: Scott 14	boxscore	Pts: Bayasgalan 26; Rebs: Mockevičius 15; Asts: Li Han-Sheng 7	Arena: Chia Nan University of Pharmacy and Science Shao Tsung Gymnasium; Attendance: 1,382; Referees: Yu Jung, Chien Chun-Yen, Huang Po-Wei

=== Matchweek 20 ===
April 4, 2024 Regular #55	Taiwan Beer Leopards	104–94	New Taipei CTBC DEA	New Taipei City
14:00 (UTC+8)	Scoring by quarter: 22–23, 27–27, 35–22, 20–22
	Pts: Chiang Yu-An 30; Rebs: Williams 21; Asts: Kromah 8	boxscore	Pts: Bachir 27; Rebs: Želionis 14; Asts: Lin Wei-Han 7	Arena: Xinzhuang Gymnasium; Attendance: 4,190; Referees: Chuang Chih-Chun, Ho Chang-Jen, Lin Yu-Hsuan

April 6, 2024 Regular #56	Taipei Mars	106–109(OT)	Tainan TSG GhostHawks	Tainan City
14:00 (UTC+8)	Scoring by quarter: 22–30, 28–35, 25–13, 26–23, Overtime: 5–8
	Pts: Lin Ping-Sheng 24; Rebs: Ndoye, Lin Ping-Sheng 9 Asts: Tsao Xun-Xiang, Lin Ping-Sheng 6	boxscore	Pts: King 27; Rebs: King 20; Asts: Bayasgalan 6	Arena: Chia Nan University of Pharmacy and Science Shao Tsung Gymnasium; Attendance: 1,248; Referees: Lin Chien-Hung, Hsieh Shang-Chien, Liu Nai-Wei

April 6, 2024 Regular #57	New Taipei CTBC DEA	108–93	Kaohsiung Aquas	Kaohsiung City
16:30 (UTC+8)	Scoring by quarter: 28–28, 33–18, 29–17, 18–30
	Pts: Želionis 27; Rebs: Želionis 13; Asts: three players 5	boxscore	Pts: Wu Siao-Jin 29; Rebs: Hu Long-Mao, Kupšas 9 Asts: Scott 11	Arena: Kaohsiung Arena; Attendance: 6,618; Referees: Lai Chien-Hao, Chien Chun-Yen, Hou Chun-Jen

April 7, 2024 Regular #58	Taiwan Beer Leopards	105–85	Tainan TSG GhostHawks	Tainan City
14:00 (UTC+8)	Scoring by quarter: 21–21, 21–16, 33–16, 24–32
	Pts: Kromah 29; Rebs: Williams 13; Asts: Chiang Yu-An, Kromah 7	boxscore	Pts: Lu Kuan-Ting 18; Rebs: Vuković 11; Asts: Ku Mao Wei-Chia 8	Arena: Chia Nan University of Pharmacy and Science Shao Tsung Gymnasium; Attendance: 1,250; Referees: Lan Wei-Hsiung, Wu Pei-Jung, Yu Fu-Jung

April 7, 2024 Regular #59	Taipei Mars	89–107	Kaohsiung Aquas	Kaohsiung City
16:30 (UTC+8)	Scoring by quarter: 20–32, 29–21, 25–29, 15–25
	Pts: Lin Ping-Sheng 32; Rebs: Johnson 12; Asts: Lin Ping-Sheng 4	boxscore	Pts: Kupšas 26; Rebs: Kupšas 9 Asts: Scott 12	Arena: Kaohsiung Arena; Attendance: 5,573; Referees: Yu Jung, Huang Po-Wei, Lin Tsung-Yun

=== Matchweek 21 ===
Rescheduled (Note: The match, originally scheduled for April 13, 2024, was rescheduled to March 9, 2024 due to the second home arena application of New Taipei CTBC DEA.) Regular #60	Tainan TSG GhostHawks	vs.	New Taipei CTBC DEA	New Taipei City
	Scoring by quarter: –, –, –, –
		boxscore		Arena: Xinzhuang Gymnasium

Rescheduled (Note: The match, originally scheduled for April 13, 2024, was rescheduled to April 20, 2024 due to the second home arena application of New Taipei CTBC DEA.) Regular #61	Taipei Mars	vs.	Taiwan Beer Leopards	Taoyuan City
	Scoring by quarter: –, –, –, –
		boxscore		Arena: Taoyuan Arena

April 13, 2024 Regular #43	Taipei Mars	81–88	New Taipei CTBC DEA	Taipei City
14:00 (UTC+8)	Scoring by quarter: 16–27, 15–24, 20–19, 30–18
	Pts: Ndoye 17; Rebs: Ndoye 13; Asts: Tsao Xun-Xiang 5	boxscore	Pts: Demps 24; Rebs: Želionis 9 Asts: Tseng Wen-Ting 9	Arena: Taipei Dome; Attendance: 15,600; Referees: Lin Chien-Hung, Lan Wei-Hsiung, Chen Chien-Lin

April 13, 2024 Regular #64	Kaohsiung Aquas	78–117	Taiwan Beer Leopards	Taoyuan City
16:30 (UTC+8)	Scoring by quarter: 19–26, 24–41, 15–23, 20–27
	Pts: Kupšas 15; Rebs: Kupšas 11; Asts: Scott 12	boxscore	Pts: Kromah 25; Rebs: Williams 16; Asts: Gao Jin-Wei, Kromah 7	Arena: Taoyuan Arena; Attendance: 2,567; Referees: Ho Chang-Jen, Lai Chien-Hao, Huang Po-Wei

April 14, 2024 Regular #63	Taipei Mars	114–76	New Taipei CTBC DEA	Taipei City
14:00 (UTC+8)	Scoring by quarter: 33–11, 31–16, 23–28, 27–21
	Pts: Hollis-Jefferson 28; Rebs: Ndoye 16; Asts: Tsao Xun-Xiang 8	boxscore	Pts: Demps 25; Rebs: three players 6 Asts: Lin Wei-Han 3	Arena: Taipei Dome; Attendance: 15,600; Referees: Yu Jung, Lai Chien-Hao, Hsieh Shang-Chien

April 14, 2024 Regular #62	Tainan TSG GhostHawks	121–125	Taiwan Beer Leopards	Taoyuan City
16:30 (UTC+8)	Scoring by quarter: 25–33, 31–32, 37–28, 28–32
	Pts: Mockevičius 25; Rebs: Mockevičius 16; Asts: Ku Mao Wei-Chia 15	boxscore	Pts: Kromah 44; Rebs: Williams 19; Asts: Chiang Yu-An 5	Arena: Taoyuan Arena; Attendance: 2,519; Referees: Lin Chien-Hung, Huang Yu-Ming, Hsieh Chieh-Lung

=== Matchweek 22 ===
Rescheduled (Note: The match, originally scheduled for April 20, 2024, was rescheduled to April 13, 2024 due to the second home arena application of New Taipei CTBC DEA.) Regular #64	Kaohsiung Aquas	vs.	Taiwan Beer Leopards	Taoyuan City
	Scoring by quarter: –, –, –, –
		boxscore		Arena: Taoyuan Arena

April 20, 2024 Regular #61	Taipei Mars	96–101	Taiwan Beer Leopards	Taoyuan City
14:00 (UTC+8)	Scoring by quarter: 19–30, 34–30, 27–31, 16–10
	Pts: Ndoye 26; Rebs: Ndoye 20; Asts: Hollis-Jefferson, Lin Ping-Sheng 4	boxscore	Pts: Cousins 25; Rebs: Williams 24; Asts: Chiang Yu-An 8	Arena: Taoyuan Arena; Attendance: 4,015; Referees: Lan Wei-Hsiung, Wu Pei-Jung, Liu Nai-Wei

April 20, 2024 Regular #65	New Taipei CTBC DEA	91–88	Tainan TSG GhostHawks	Tainan City
16:30 (UTC+8)	Scoring by quarter: 27–20, 18–25, 17–22, 29–21
	Pts: Želionis 43; Rebs: Želionis 13; Asts: Demps, Wei Chia-Hao 5	boxscore	Pts: Bayasgalan, Vuković 17; Rebs: Mockevičius 18; Asts: Ku Mao Wei-Chia 7	Arena: Chia Nan University of Pharmacy and Science Shao Tsung Gymnasium; Attendance: 1,355; Referees: Hsieh Shang-Chien, Chien Chun-Yen, Hsieh Chieh-Lung

April 21, 2024 Regular #66	Taipei Mars	91–79	Taiwan Beer Leopards	Taoyuan City
14:00 (UTC+8)	Scoring by quarter: 25–25, 22–17, 23–19, 21–18
	Pts: Ting Sheng-Ju 26; Rebs: Koreniuk 14; Asts: Ting Sheng-Ju 6	boxscore	Pts: Cousins 21; Rebs: Cousins 20; Asts: Gao Jin-Wei 7	Arena: Taoyuan Arena; Attendance: 5,267; Referees: Ho Chang-Jen, Hsieh Shang-Chien, Chien Chun-Yen

April 21, 2024 Regular #67	Kaohsiung Aquas	86–78	Tainan TSG GhostHawks	Tainan City
16:30 (UTC+8)	Scoring by quarter: 31–13, 17–23, 18–16, 20–26
	Pts: Scott 18; Rebs: Scott 12; Asts: Scott 8	boxscore	Pts: Bjelica, Vuković 18; Rebs: Mockevičius 16; Asts: Li Han-Sheng 4	Arena: Chia Nan University of Pharmacy and Science Shao Tsung Gymnasium; Attendance: 1,799; Referees: Yu Jung, Huang Po-Wei, Lin Yu-Hsuan

=== Matchweek 23 ===
April 27, 2024 Regular #68	New Taipei CTBC DEA	121–99	Kaohsiung Aquas	Kaohsiung City
14:00 (UTC+8)	Scoring by quarter: 27–26, 35–16, 23–38, 36–19
	Pts: Bachir 34; Rebs: Zeković 8 Asts: Tseng Wen-Ting 9	boxscore	Pts: Scott 22; Rebs: Scott 11; Asts: Hu Long-Mao 6	Arena: Fengshan Arena; Attendance: 3,259; Referees: Lai Chien-Hao, Chen Chien-Lin, Liu Nai-Wei

April 28, 2024 Regular #69	Taiwan Beer Leopards	113–109	Kaohsiung Aquas	Kaohsiung City
14:00 (UTC+8)	Scoring by quarter: 28–29, 31–24, 28–29, 26–27
	Pts: Cousins 25; Rebs: Cousins 14; Asts: Kromah 7	boxscore	Pts: Scott 27; Rebs: Scott, Geramipoor 12; Asts: Scott 11	Arena: Fengshan Arena; Attendance: 4,577; Referees: Lan Wei-Hsiung, Lin Chien-Hung, Hsieh Chieh-Lung

April 28, 2024 Regular #70	Tainan TSG GhostHawks	70–97	Taipei Mars	Taipei City
16:30 (UTC+8)	Scoring by quarter: 18–24, 14–26, 14–33, 24–14
	Pts: Ku Mao Wei-Chia 13; Rebs: Mockevičius 14; Asts: Ku Mao Wei-Chia, Vuković 3	boxscore	Pts: Ndoye 20; Rebs: Ndoye 15; Asts: Tsao Xun-Xiang 10	Arena: Taipei Heping Basketball Gymnasium; Attendance: 4,861; Referees: Yu Jung, Huang Po-Wei, Huang Yu-Ming

== Awards ==
=== Yearly awards ===
2023–24 T1 League awards
Award	Recipient	Team	Ref.
Most Valuable Player	Mohammad Al Bachir Gadiaga	New Taipei CTBC DEA	
Most Valuable Import	Lasan Kromah	Taiwan Beer Leopards	
Most Popular Player of the Year	DeMarcus Cousins	Taiwan Beer Leopards	
Best Home-Court of the Year	New Taipei CTBC DEA		
Defensive Player of the Year	Mindaugas Kupšas	Kaohsiung Aquas	
Rookie of the Year	Gao Jin-Wei	Taiwan Beer Leopards	
Sixth Man of the Year	Lin Ping-Sheng	Taipei Mars	
Most Improved Player	Lin Ping-Sheng	Taipei Mars	
Coach of the Year	Lee Yi-Hua	New Taipei CTBC DEA	
General Manager of the Year	Yen Hsing-Su	Taiwan Beer Leopards	
Best Cheerleaders of the Year	Taishin Wonders	Taipei Mars	

- All-T1 League First Team:
  - Gao Jin-Wei (Taiwan Beer Leopards)
  - Chiang Yu-An (Taiwan Beer Leopards)
  - Mohammad Al Bachir Gadiaga (New Taipei CTBC DEA)
  - Hu Long-Mao (Kaohsiung Aquas)
  - Lasan Kromah (Taiwan Beer Leopards)
- All-Defensive First Team:
  - Lin Ping-Sheng (Taipei Mars)
  - Chiang Yu-An (Taiwan Beer Leopards)
  - Mohammad Al Bachir Gadiaga (New Taipei CTBC DEA)
  - Hu Long-Mao (Kaohsiung Aquas)
  - Mindaugas Kupšas (Kaohsiung Aquas)

=== Statistical awards ===
2023–24 T1 League statistical awards
Award	Recipient	Team	Statistic	Ref.
Points Leader	Lasan Kromah	Taiwan Beer Leopards	25.7	
Rebounds Leader	Devin Williams	Taiwan Beer Leopards	16.6	
Assists Leader	Jason Brickman	Kaohsiung Aquas	12.7	
Steals Leader	Lasan Kromah	Taiwan Beer Leopards	3.0	
Blocks Leader	Mindaugas Kupšas	Kaohsiung Aquas	1.7	

=== MVP of the Month ===
MVP of the Month awards were only for local players.

Month	Recipient	Team	Ref.
2023
November	Chiang Yu-An	Taiwan Beer Leopards	
December	Hu Long-Mao	Kaohsiung Aquas	
2024
January	Chiu Tzu-Hsuan	Kaohsiung Aquas	
February & March	Mohammad Al Bachir Gadiaga	New Taipei CTBC DEA	
April	Chiang Yu-An	Taiwan Beer Leopards	

=== Import of the Month ===
Import of the Month awards were only for import players.

Month	Recipient	Team	Ref.
2023
November	Lasan Kromah	Taiwan Beer Leopards	
December	Jason Brickman	Kaohsiung Aquas	
2024
January	DeMarcus Cousins	Taiwan Beer Leopards	
February & March	Mindaugas Kupšas	Kaohsiung Aquas	
April	Lasan Kromah	Taiwan Beer Leopards	

== See also ==
- 2023–24 Kaohsiung Aquas season
- 2023–24 New Taipei CTBC DEA season
- 2023–24 Taichung Suns season
- 2023–24 Tainan TSG GhostHawks season
- 2023–24 Taipei Mars season
- 2023–24 Taiwan Beer Leopards season
