= 2023–24 T1 League season =

3rd T1 League season

- League: T1 League
- Sport: Basketball
- Duration: October 28, 2023 – April 28, 2024 (regular season); May 4 – 14, 2024 (semifinals); May 24 – June 1, 2024 (finals)
- Games: 28 per team
- Teams: 5
- TV partner(s): VL Sports, ELTA TV

Draft
- Top draft pick: Lin Sin-Kuan
- Picked by: TaiwanBeer Leopards

Regular season
- Top seed: New Taipei CTBC DEA
- Season MVP: Mohammad Al Bachir Gadiaga (DEA)
- Top scorer: Lasan Kromah (Leopards)

Playoffs

Finals
- Champions: Taiwan Beer Leopards
- Runners-up: Taipei Mars
- Finals MVP: DeMarcus Cousins (Leopards)

T1 League seasons
- ← 2022–23

The 2023–24 T1 League season was the third season of the T1 League, with the Kaohsiung Aquas, New Taipei CTBC DEA, Tainan TSG GhostHawks, Taipei Mars, and the Taiwan Beer Leopards participating in this competition. The regular season started on October 28, 2023 and ended on April 28, 2024. The semifinals series started on May 4 and ended on May 14. The finals series started on May 24 and ended on June 1. On June 1, the Taiwan Beer Leopards defeated the Taipei Mars, 4–0, winning the 2023–24 season championship.

== Teams ==
Team	Chinese name	Location	Arena	Map
Kaohsiung Aquas	高雄全家海神	Kaohsiung City	Kaohsiung Arena; Fengshan Arena (Note: Home games of the April 27 and 28, 2024 and semifinals.)	2023–24 T1 League season is located in Taiwan
New Taipei CTBC DEA	新北中信特攻	New Taipei City	Xinzhuang Gymnasium; Taipei Dome (Note: Co-home games of the April 13 and 14, 2024 with Taipei Mars.)	2023–24 T1 League season is located in Taiwan
Tainan TSG GhostHawks	臺南台鋼獵鷹	Tainan City	Chia Nan University of Pharmacy and Science Shao Tsung Gymnasium	2023–24 T1 League season is located in Taiwan
Taipei Mars	臺北戰神	Taipei City	Taipei Heping Basketball Gymnasium; Taipei Dome (Note: Co-home games of the April 13 and 14, 2024 with New Taipei CTBC DEA.); National Taiwan University Sports Center (Note: Home games of the semifinals.)	2023–24 T1 League season is located in Taiwan
Taiwan Beer Leopards	台啤永豐雲豹	Taoyuan City	Taoyuan Arena	2023–24 T1 League season is located in Taiwan

== Season format ==
- Each team plays against another seven times. And each team plays 28 matches total in the regular season.
- Semifinals series: Best-of-five series. Matchup is decided by seeding in regular season. The first seed plays against the fourth seed, and the second seed plays against the third seed. The winners can qualify for the finals series.
- Finals series: Best-of-seven series. The series are contested by the winners of semifinals series.

== Import players restrictions ==
- Each team is able to register 3 or 4 general import players.
- Each team is able to select 2 or 3 import players into active roster in each match.
- 8-imports-in-4-quarters rule: each quarter can have 2 import players on the court.

== Import players ==
Team	Import players	Former import players
Kaohsiung Aquas	(Lithuania) Mindaugas Kupšas (United Kingdom) (Iran) Aaron Geramipoor (United States) Perry Jones (United States) Shannon Scott	(Philippines) (United States) Jason Brickman
New Taipei CTBC DEA	(Lithuania) Edgaras Želionis (Croatia) Kristijan Krajina (Montenegro) (Serbia) Dragan Zeković (United States) Cody Demps	(Sweden) Viktor Gaddefors (Jamaica) Tyran De Lattibeaudiere
Tainan TSG GhostHawks	(United States) Nick King (Montenegro) (Serbia) Milko Bjelica (Lithuania) Egidijus Mockevičius (Croatia) Domagoj Vuković	(United States) Robert Upshaw (United States) Eric Griffin (Malta) (Italy) Samuel Deguara (United States) Willie Reed (Canada) Sim Bhullar
Taipei Mars	(United States) Jaylen Johnson (Senegal) Youssou Ndoye (Ukraine) Vladyslav Koreniuk (United States) Rahlir Hollis-Jefferson	(United States) Danny Pippen (United States) Erik McCree
Taiwan Beer Leopards	(Liberia) (United States) Lasan Kromah (United States) Devin Williams (United States) DeMarcus Cousins (United States) DeAndre Williams	(United States) Justyn Hamilton (Australia) Daniel Johnson

== Transactions ==
=== Retirement ===
- On April 16, 2023, Lung Hung-Yuan announced his retirement from professional basketball.
- On November 4, 2023, Peng Chun-Yen announced his retirement from professional basketball.

=== Draft ===
The 2023 T1 League draft was held on July 14, 2023, at Songshan Cultural and Creative Park Warehouse 1 in Taipei City.

=== Coaching changes ===
Coaching changes
Team	2022–23 season	2023–24 season
Off-season
Taichung Suns	Chris Gavina	Anthony Tucker
TaiwanBeer Leopards	John Bennett	Michael Olson
Taipei Taishin Mars	—N/a	Brian Adams
Taichung Suns	Anthony Tucker	—N/a
In-season
Taipei Mars	Brian Adams	Hsu Hao-Cheng (interim)
Tainan TSG GhostHawks	Liu Meng-Chu	Lin Yu-Cheng (interim)
Taiwan Beer Leopards	Michael Olson	Chou Chun-San (interim)
Tainan TSG GhostHawks	Lin Yu-Cheng (interim)	Raoul Korner
Taiwan Beer Leopards	Chou Chun-San (interim)	Charles Dubé-Brais

==== Off-season ====
- On June 29, 2023, the Taichung Suns announced that Chris Gavina left the team.
- On July 1, 2023, the Taichung Suns hired Anthony Tucker as their new head coach.
- On August 14, 2023, the TaiwanBeer Leopards hired Michael Olson as their new head coach.
- On September 14, 2023, the Taipei Taishin Mars hired Brian Adams as their new head coach.
- On October 13, 2023, the news reported that Anthony Tucker left the Taichung Suns.

==== In-season ====
- On December 31, 2023, the Taipei Mars announced that Brian Adams resigned from head coach.
- On January 3, 2024, the Taipei Mars assistant coach, Hsu Hao-Cheng was named as their interim head coach.
- On January 9, 2024, the Tainan TSG GhostHawks announced that Liu Meng-Chu resigned from head coach, and named Lin Yu-Cheng, the Tainan TSG GhostHawks assistant coach, as their interim head coach.
- On January 13, 2024, the Taiwan Beer Leopards announced to terminate contract relationship with Michael Olson, and named Chou Chun-San, the Taiwan Beer Leopards consultant, as their interim head coach.
- On January 29, 2024, the Tainan TSG GhostHawks hired Raoul Korner as their new head coach.
- On February 15, 2024, the Taiwan Beer Leopards assistant coach, Charles Dubé-Brais was named as their head coach.

== 2023 interleague play ==
Only 1 team, the Taipei Taishin Mars, participated in these invitational games.

== Preseason ==
The T1 League held the preseason games at the Xinzhuang Gymnasium on October 13 to 15, 2023.

=== Game log ===
October 13, 2023 Preseason #01	Tainan TSG GhostHawks	108–114	New Taipei CTBC DEA	New Taipei City
18:00 (UTC+8)	Scoring by quarter: 18–31, 29–28, 32–36, 29–19
	Pts: Deguara 27; Rebs: King, Deguara 8 Asts: three players 5	boxscore	Pts: Gaddefors 28; Rebs: Krajina, Huang Hung-Han 6 Asts: Liu Jen-Hao 8	Arena: Xinzhuang Gymnasium; Attendance: 753; Referees: Lin Chien-Hung, Hsieh Shang-Chien, Chen Chien-Lin

October 14, 2023 Preseason #02	Kaohsiung Aquas	98–94	TaiwanBeer Leopards	New Taipei City
14:30 (UTC+8)	Scoring by quarter: 27–20, 21–14, 30–30, 20–30
	Pts: Jones 24; Rebs: Kupšas 7 Asts: Brickman 13	boxscore	Pts: Hamilton 23; Rebs: Williams 15; Asts: Kromah 7	Arena: Xinzhuang Gymnasium; Attendance: 1,236; Referees: Lan Wei-Hsiung, Lai Chien-Hao, Liu Nai-Wei

October 14, 2023 Preseason #03	Taipei Mars	91–100	Tainan TSG GhostHawks	New Taipei City
17:00 (UTC+8)	Scoring by quarter: 29–28, 28–25, 11–23, 23–24
	Pts: McCree 23; Rebs: Johnson 15; Asts: Lin Ping-Sheng, Ting Sheng-Ju 4	boxscore	Pts: Deguara 45; Rebs: Deguara 25; Asts: King, Hu Kai-Hsiang 9	Arena: Xinzhuang Gymnasium; Attendance: 2,876; Referees: Yu Jung, Chien Chun-Yen, Lin Yu-Hsuan

October 15, 2023 Preseason #04	New Taipei CTBC DEA	80–87	Kaohsiung Aquas	New Taipei City
14:30 (UTC+8)	Scoring by quarter: 28–20, 19–19, 14–17, 19–31
	Pts: Zeković 21; Rebs: Gaddefors 15; Asts: Gaddefors 7	boxscore	Pts: Brickman 19; Rebs: Jones 15; Asts: Brickman 7	Arena: Xinzhuang Gymnasium; Attendance: 1,932; Referees: Chuang Chih-Chun, Huang Po-Wei, Chen Chien-Lin

October 15, 2023 Preseason #05	TaiwanBeer Leopards	95–85	Taipei Mars	New Taipei City
17:00 (UTC+8)	Scoring by quarter: 24–23, 33–22, 15–24, 23–16
	Pts: Kromah 29; Rebs: Williams 22; Asts: Chiang Yu-An 8	boxscore	Pts: Johnson 23; Rebs: Johnson 16; Asts: Lin Ping-Sheng, Mobley 4	Arena: Xinzhuang Gymnasium; Attendance: 3,198; Referees: Lin Chien-Hung, Wu Pei-Jung, Hsieh Chieh-Lung

== Regular season ==
The regular season started on October 28, 2023 and ended on April 28, 2024. On October 28, the 2023–24 season opening game, matched by the Tainan TSG GhostHawks and the New Taipei CTBC DEA, was played at Xinzhuang Gymnasium.

=== League table ===
Pos	Team	Pld	W	L	PCT	GB	Qualification
1	New Taipei CTBC DEA	28	19	9	.679	—	Advance to semifinals
2	Taiwan Beer Leopards	28	18	10	.643	1	Advance to semifinals
3	Kaohsiung Aquas	28	15	13	.536	4	Advance to semifinals
4	Taipei Mars	28	11	17	.393	8	Advance to semifinals
5	Tainan TSG GhostHawks	28	7	21	.250	12	

Source: T1 League

=== Results ===
Home \ Away	MARS	DEA	LEOPARDS	GHOSTHAWKS	AQUAS
Taipei Mars	—	79–104	102–109	119–112	124–110
Taipei Mars	—	91–105	113–120	107–99	98–114
Taipei Mars	—	75–94	126–96	96–89	106–109
Taipei Mars	—	—	—	97–70	100–94
New Taipei CTBC DEA	86–85	—	100–107	106–92	86–77
New Taipei CTBC DEA	87–83	—	95–90	88–85	102–100
New Taipei CTBC DEA	88–81	—	97–104	85–73	90–87
New Taipei CTBC DEA	76–114	—	94–104	—	—
Taiwan Beer Leopards	102–99	73–87	—	120–112	110–95
Taiwan Beer Leopards	104–111	97–91	—	119–90	101–108
Taiwan Beer Leopards	101–96	105–85	—	114–88	117–78
Taiwan Beer Leopards	79–91	—	—	125–121	—
Tainan TSG GhostHawks	112–90	91–108	108–97	—	89–98
Tainan TSG GhostHawks	90–92	94–105	108–93	—	98–95
Tainan TSG GhostHawks	109–106*	113–100	85–105	—	92–99
Tainan TSG GhostHawks	—	88–91	—	—	78–86
Kaohsiung Aquas	111–86	94–93	122–104	89–98	—
Kaohsiung Aquas	98–94	99–93	99–103	110–82	—
Kaohsiung Aquas	107–89	93–108	118–117	120–111	—
Kaohsiung Aquas	—	99–121	109–113	—	—

Source: T1 League
Legend: Blue = home team win; Red = away team win.

=== Rescheduled games ===
- Two New Taipei CTBC DEA home games (against the Taiwan Beer Leopards on February 24, and against the Taipei Mars on February 25) were rescheduled to March 3 and February 28 due to the 2025 FIBA Asia Cup qualification.
- Two New Taipei CTBC DEA home games (against the Taipei Mars on February 28, and against the Tainan TSG GhostHawks on April 13) were rescheduled to April 13 and March 9 due to the second home arena application of New Taipei CTBC DEA.
- Two Taiwan Beer Leopards home games (against the Taipei Mars on April 13, and against the Kaohsiung Aquas on April 20) were rescheduled to April 20 and 13 due to the second home arena application of New Taipei CTBC DEA.

== Playoffs ==
- Semifinals series: The top four seeds play the best-of-five semifinals series. The winners can qualify the finals series.
- Finals series: The winners of the semifinals series play the best-of-seven finals series.

=== Bracket ===
Semifinals
1	New Taipei CTBC DEA	2
4	**Taipei Mars**	**3**
2	**Taiwan Beer Leopards**	**3**
3	Kaohsiung Aquas	0

Finals
4	Taipei Mars	0
2	**Taiwan Beer Leopards**	**4**

Bold: Series winner
Italic: Team with home-court advantage

== Statistics ==
=== Individual statistic leaders ===
Category	Player	Team	Statistic
Points per game	Lasan Kromah	Taiwan Beer Leopards	25.7
Rebounds per game	Devin Williams	Taiwan Beer Leopards	16.6
Assists per game	Jason Brickman	Kaohsiung Aquas	12.7
Steals per game	Lasan Kromah	Taiwan Beer Leopards	3.0
Blocks per game	Mindaugas Kupšas	Kaohsiung Aquas	1.7
Turnovers per game	Lasan Kromah	Taiwan Beer Leopards	3.7
Fouls per game	Hu Long-Mao	Kaohsiung Aquas	3.8
Minutes per game	Nick King	Tainan TSG GhostHawks	41:15
FG%	Mindaugas Kupšas	Kaohsiung Aquas	64.5%
3P%	Yu Huan-Ya	Kaohsiung Aquas	39.9%
FT%	Chiang Yu-An	Taiwan Beer Leopards	77.5%

=== Individual game highs ===
Category	Player	Team	Statistic
Points	Lasan Kromah	Taiwan Beer Leopards	44
Rebounds	Devin Williams	Taiwan Beer Leopards	33
Assists	Jason Brickman	Kaohsiung Aquas	20
Steals	Lasan Kromah	Taiwan Beer Leopards	8
Steals	Lin Ping-Sheng	Taipei Mars	8
Steals	Shannon Scott	Kaohsiung Aquas	8
Blocks	Sim Bhullar	Tainan TSG GhostHawks	6
Turnovers	Lasan Kromah	Taiwan Beer Leopards	8
Turnovers	Devin Williams	Taiwan Beer Leopards	8
Turnovers	Edgaras Želionis	New Taipei CTBC DEA	8
Three pointers	Yu Huan-Ya	Kaohsiung Aquas	10

=== Team statistic leaders ===
Category	Team	Statistic
Points per game	Taiwan Beer Leopards	104.6
Rebounds per game	Taiwan Beer Leopards	47.2
Assists per game	Kaohsiung Aquas	25.6
Steals per game	New Taipei CTBC DEA	11.0
Blocks per game	Tainan TSG GhostHawks	3.8
Turnovers per game	New Taipei CTBC DEA	16.9
Fouls per game	Kaohsiung Aquas	23.1
FG%	Kaohsiung Aquas	46.5%
3P%	Taiwan Beer Leopards	34.2%
FT%	Taiwan Beer Leopards	72.0%

== Awards ==
=== Yearly awards ===
2023–24 T1 League awards
Award	Recipient	Team	Ref.
Most Valuable Player	Mohammad Al Bachir Gadiaga	New Taipei CTBC DEA	
Most Valuable Import	Lasan Kromah	Taiwan Beer Leopards	
Most Popular Player of the Year	DeMarcus Cousins	Taiwan Beer Leopards	
Best Home-Court of the Year	New Taipei CTBC DEA		
Defensive Player of the Year	Mindaugas Kupšas	Kaohsiung Aquas	
Rookie of the Year	Gao Jin-Wei	Taiwan Beer Leopards	
Sixth Man of the Year	Lin Ping-Sheng	Taipei Mars	
Most Improved Player	Lin Ping-Sheng	Taipei Mars	
Coach of the Year	Lee Yi-Hua	New Taipei CTBC DEA	
General Manager of the Year	Yen Hsing-Su	Taiwan Beer Leopards	
Best Cheerleaders of the Year	Taishin Wonders	Taipei Mars	

- All-T1 League First Team:
  - Gao Jin-Wei (Taiwan Beer Leopards)
  - Chiang Yu-An (Taiwan Beer Leopards)
  - Mohammad Al Bachir Gadiaga (New Taipei CTBC DEA)
  - Hu Long-Mao (Kaohsiung Aquas)
  - Lasan Kromah (Taiwan Beer Leopards)
- All-Defensive First Team:
  - Lin Ping-Sheng (Taipei Mars)
  - Chiang Yu-An (Taiwan Beer Leopards)
  - Mohammad Al Bachir Gadiaga (New Taipei CTBC DEA)
  - Hu Long-Mao (Kaohsiung Aquas)
  - Mindaugas Kupšas (Kaohsiung Aquas)

=== Statistical awards ===
2023–24 T1 League statistical awards
Award	Recipient	Team	Statistic	Ref.
Points Leader	Lasan Kromah	Taiwan Beer Leopards	25.7	
Rebounds Leader	Devin Williams	Taiwan Beer Leopards	16.6	
Assists Leader	Jason Brickman	Kaohsiung Aquas	12.7	
Steals Leader	Lasan Kromah	Taiwan Beer Leopards	3.0	
Blocks Leader	Mindaugas Kupšas	Kaohsiung Aquas	1.7	

=== Finals awards ===
2024 T1 League Finals awards
Award	Recipient	Team	Ref.
Champion	Taiwan Beer Leopards		
Finals MVP	DeMarcus Cousins	Taiwan Beer Leopards	

=== MVP of the Month ===
MVP of the Month awards were only for local players.

Month	Recipient	Team	Ref.
2023
November	Chiang Yu-An	Taiwan Beer Leopards	
December	Hu Long-Mao	Kaohsiung Aquas	
2024
January	Chiu Tzu-Hsuan	Kaohsiung Aquas	
February & March	Mohammad Al Bachir Gadiaga	New Taipei CTBC DEA	
April	Chiang Yu-An	Taiwan Beer Leopards	

=== Import of the Month ===
Import of the Month awards were only for import players.

Month	Recipient	Team	Ref.
2023
November	Lasan Kromah	Taiwan Beer Leopards	
December	Jason Brickman	Kaohsiung Aquas	
2024
January	DeMarcus Cousins	Taiwan Beer Leopards	
February & March	Mindaugas Kupšas	Kaohsiung Aquas	
April	Lasan Kromah	Taiwan Beer Leopards	

== Arenas ==
- The TaiwanBeer Leopards announced that they would play their home games at the Taoyuan Arena in this season.
- The Taipei Taishin basketball team announced that they would play their home games at the Taipei Heping Basketball Gymnasium in this season.
- The Kaohsiung Aquas announced that their home games on April 27 and 28, 2024 would change to Fengshan Arena.
- The New Taipei CTBC DEA announced that their home games on April 13 and 14, 2024 would change to Taipei Dome in Taipei City. And the Taipei Dome would be the co-home arena of the New Taipei CTBC DEA and Taipei Mars.
- The Taipei Mars announced that they would play their home games in semifinals at the National Taiwan University Sports Center.
- The Kaohsiung Aquas announced that they would play their home games in semifinals at the Fengshan Arena.

== Media ==
- The games will be broadcast on television via VL Sports and ELTA TV, and online via YouTube and Twitch.

== Notable occurrences ==
- On June 26, 2023, the T1 League announced that the Taishin Sports Entertainment Co., Ltd. took over the participation rights of the TaiwanBeer HeroBears.
- On July 4, 2023, the Taoyuan Leopards announced to cooperate with the Taiwan Beer basketball association, and the Taoyuan Leopards were renamed to the TaiwanBeer Leopards.
- On July 12, 2023, the TaiwanBeer Leopards became the first team to have the first and second overall draft picks of one draft in Taiwanese professional basketball history.
- On July 14, 2023, Lin Sin-Kuan became the first player of the first overall T1 League draft picks.
- On August 18, 2023, the T1 League announced that Chang Shu-Jen, the secretary general of the league, left the league.
- On August 21, 2023, the T1 League announced that Wang Chih-Chun was the new secretary general of the league.
- On August 24, 2023, the name of Taipei Taishin basketball team was announced as the Taipei Taishin Mars.
- On September 15, 2023, the T1 League announced that the 2023–24 season participation rights of the Taichung Suns was cancelled due to financial qualification.
- On October 11, 2023, the T1 League announced that the play-in series of the 2023–24 season was cancelled.
- On October 12, 2023, Tsai Shang-Hua, the strategic marketing director of the T1 League, announced to leave the league.
- On October 16, 2023, the Taichung Suns announced to fold officially.
- On October 28, 2023, the T1 League announced that Lo Chen-Feng, former player of the Taiwan Beer Leopards, was issued a permanent ban due to involving in gambling.
- On December 2, 2023, Chiang Yu-An of the Taiwan Beer Leopards recorded 1,000 points in T1 League career.
- On December 3, 2023, Hsieh Ya-Hsuan of the New Taipei CTBC DEA recorded 100 steals in his career.
- On December 10, 2023, Samuel Deguara of the Tainan TSG GhostHawks recorded 1,000 points in Taiwan career.
- On December 16, 2023, Mohammad Al Bachir Gadiaga of the New Taipei CTBC DEA recorded 200 assists in his career.
- On December 17, 2023, Mohammad Al Bachir Gadiaga of the New Taipei CTBC DEA recorded 100 steals in his career.
- On December 18, 2023, DeMarcus Cousins, the four-time NBA All-Star, signed with the Taiwan Beer Leopards.
- On December 23, 2023, Jason Brickman of the Kaohsiung Aquas recorded 1,000 points in T1 League career.
- On January 6, 2024, Lin Ping-Sheng of the Taipei Mars recorded 100 three pointers in T1 League career.
- On January 6, 2024, Mindaugas Kupšas of the Kaohsiung Aquas recorded 100 blocks in T1 League career.
- On January 6, 2024, Devin Williams of the Taiwan Beer Leopards recorded 200 rebounds in T1 League career.
- On January 12, 2024, Hu Long-Mao of the Kaohsiung Aquas recorded 1,000 points in T1 League career.
- On January 20, 2024, Hsieh Ya-Hsuan of the New Taipei CTBC DEA recorded 200 assists in his career.
- On January 21, 2024, Lin Ping-Sheng of the Taipei Mars recorded 200 assists in T1 League career.
- On January 27, 2024, Lasan Kromah of the Taiwan Beer Leopards recorded 100 assists in T1 League career.
- On February 18, 2024, Mindaugas Kupšas of the Kaohsiung Aquas became the first player to record 1,500 points in T1 League history.
- On February 18, 2024, Yu Huan-Ya of the Kaohsiung Aquas recorded 500 three pointers in his career.
- On March 13, 2024, the New Taipei CTBC DEA announced that their home games on April 13 and 14, 2024 would change to Taipei Dome in Taipei City, and jointly held the 2024 Metro Battle with Taipei Mars. These games would be the first professional basketball games held in Taipei Dome.
- On March 16, 2024, Mohammad Al Bachir Gadiaga of the New Taipei CTBC DEA recorded 1,500 points in his career.
- On March 16, 2024, Tseng Wen-Ting of the New Taipei CTBC DEA recorded 100 assists in T1 League career.
- On March 23, 2024, Gao Jin-Wei of the Taiwan Beer Leopards recorded 100 assists in his career.
- On March 30, 2024, Wei Chia-Hao of the New Taipei CTBC DEA recorded 100 steals in his career.
- On April 6, 2024, Hu Long-Mao of the Kaohsiung Aquas recorded 2,000 points in his career.
- On April 13, 2024, the New Taipei CTBC DEA defeated the Taipei Mars, 88–81, winning the first victory in Taipei Dome. And there was 15,600 people watching the match, with the largest crowd in Taiwanese professional basketball history.
- On April 27, 2024, the New Taipei CTBC DEA became the team to win the two straight regular season first seeds in T1 League history.
- On April 28, 2024, Yu Huan-Ya of the Kaohsiung Aquas recorded 1,000 points in T1 League career.
- On April 28, 2024, Chang Po-Sheng of the Tainan TSG GhostHawks recorded 3,500 points in his career.
- On May 4, 2024, the game matched by the Taipei Mars and the New Taipei CTBC DEA became the first overtime semifinals game in T1 League history.
- On May 8, 2024, Chiang Yu-An of the Taiwan Beer Leopards and Mohammad Al Bachir Gadiaga of the New Taipei CTBC DEA became the players to award the three straight All-T1 League First Team awards in T1 League history.
- On May 9, 2024, Lin Ping-Sheng of the Taipei Mars and Hu Long-Mao of the Kaohsiung Aquas became the players to award the three straight All-Defensive First Team awards in T1 League history.
- On May 14, 2024, Taipei Mars became the first team to qualify finals series with lower seed in T1 League history.
- On May 21, 2024, Lee Yi-Hua of the New Taipei CTBC DEA became the first coach to award the two straight Coach of the Year awards in T1 League history.
- On May 22, 2024, New Taipei CTBC DEA became the first team to award the three straight Best Home-Court of the Year in T1 League history.
- On June 12, 2024, Mohammad Al Bachir Gadiaga of the New Taipei CTBC DEA became the first player to award the two straight Most Valuable Player awards in T1 League history.

== See also ==
- 2023–24 Kaohsiung Aquas season
- 2023–24 New Taipei CTBC DEA season
- 2023–24 Taichung Suns season
- 2023–24 Tainan TSG GhostHawks season
- 2023–24 Taipei Mars season
- 2023–24 Taiwan Beer Leopards season
