= 2023–24 Taiwan Beer Leopards season =

Taiwanese professional basketball season

- T1 League champions
- President: Liu Chin-Liang
- Head Coach: Michael Olson (contract terminated); Chou Chun-San (interim); Charles Dubé-Brais
- Arena: Taoyuan Arena

T1 League results
- Record: 18–10 (64.3%)
- Place: 2nd
- Playoffs finish: Champions (1st title) (defeated Mars, 4–0)

Player records
- Points: Lasan Kromah 25.7
- Rebounds: Devin Williams 16.6
- Assists: Lasan Kromah 6.5

The 2023–24 Taiwan Beer Leopards season was the franchise's third season, its third season in the T1 League.

On August 14, 2023, the Leopards hired Michael Olson as their new head coach. On January 13, 2024, the Leopards announced to terminate contract relationship with Michael Olson, and named Chou Chun-San, the consultant of the Taiwan Beer Leopards, as their interim head coach. On February 15, the Leopards named Charles Dubé-Brais, the assistant coach of the Taiwan Beer Leopards, as their new head coach.

== Draft ==
Round	Pick	Player	Position(s)	School / club team
1	1	Lin Sin-Kuan	Forward	NTNU
1	2	Gao Jin-Wei	Guard	UCH

- Reference：

On July 12, 2023, the Leopards acquired 2023 first-round 2nd pick from Taipei Taishin basketball team in exchange for Huang Tsung-Han and 2024 first-round pick.

== Roster ==
2023–24 Taiwan Beer Leopards roster
Players
Coaches

Pos.	No.	Nat.	Name	Ht.	Wt.	Age	From
G	0	(Taiwan)	Chen Hsiao-Jung	1.80 m (5 ft 11 in)	70 kg (154 lb)	24 – 6 November 1999	NTUST
PG	1	(Taiwan)	Cheng Wei (C)	1.80 m (5 ft 11 in)	90 kg (198 lb)	33 – 8 January 1991	USC
G	5	(Taiwan)	Gao Jin-Wei	1.77 m (5 ft 10 in)	66 kg (146 lb)	23 – 23 October 2000	UCH
SG	7	(Taiwan)	Lu Chieh-Min	1.84 m (6 ft 0 in)	88 kg (194 lb)	28 – 12 October 1995	FJU
SF	10	(Taiwan)	Chu I-Tsung	1.86 m (6 ft 1 in)	85 kg (187 lb)	37 – 4 August 1986	HWU
F	12	(Taiwan)	Lin Sin-Kuan	1.92 m (6 ft 4 in)	97 kg (214 lb)	22 – 9 May 2002	NTNU
F	13	(United States)	DeAndre Williams (I)	2.06 m (6 ft 9 in)	93 kg (205 lb)	27 – 4 October 1996	Memphis
PG	14	(Taiwan)	Chiang Yu-An	1.74 m (5 ft 9 in)	65 kg (143 lb)	32 – 4 August 1991	NTUS
C	15	(United States)	DeMarcus Cousins (I)	2.08 m (6 ft 10 in)	122 kg (269 lb)	33 – 13 August 1990	Kentucky
SF	24	(Liberia) (United States)	Lasan Kromah (I)	1.98 m (6 ft 6 in)	91 kg (201 lb)	32 – 24 June 1991	UConn
SG	27	(Taiwan)	Huang Jhen	1.93 m (6 ft 4 in)	86 kg (190 lb)	33 – 27 June 1990	FJU
C	32	(Taiwan)	Wu Pei-Chia	2.05 m (6 ft 9 in)	100 kg (220 lb)	24 – 27 September 1999	SHU
PF	41	(United States)	Devin Williams (I)	2.06 m (6 ft 9 in)	122 kg (269 lb)	30 – 31 May 1994	West Virginia
SG	75	(Taiwan)	Lee Chi-Wei	1.92 m (6 ft 4 in)	87 kg (192 lb)	31 – 8 April 1993	MDU
C	82	(Taiwan)	Liu Yuan-Kai	2.06 m (6 ft 9 in)	105 kg (231 lb)	32 – 9 July 1991	FJU

Head coach

- (Canada) Charles Dubé-Brais

Assistant coach(es)

- (Philippines) (Canada) Jeffrey Dosado
- (Taiwan) Liu Wen-He

Strength & conditioning coach(es)

- (Taiwan) Chen Tzu-Yi
- (Taiwan) Chen Ting-Wei

Athletic trainer(s)

- (Taiwan) Chen Wei-Chih
- (Taiwan) Cheng Po-Wei

Legend

- (C) Team captain
- (I) Import player
- Injured

- Roster
Updated: June 1, 2024

== Japan X Taiwan Friendship Match 2023 ==
Recap

September 17, 2023
17:00 (UTC+9)

TaiwanBeer Leopards	70–75	Kumamoto Volters
Scoring by quarter: 17–16, 20–22, 8–19, 25–18

Kumamoto Prefectural Gymnasium, Kumamoto

== Preseason ==
=== Game log ===
2023 preseason game log
Total: 1–1 (home: 0–1; road: 1–0)
Preseason : 1–1 (home: 0–1; road: 1–0)

Game	Date	Team	Score	High points	High rebounds	High assists	Location Attendance	Record
1	October 14	Aquas	L 94–98	Justyn Hamilton (23)	Devin Williams (15)	Lasan Kromah (7)	Xinzhuang Gymnasium; 1,236	0–1
2	October 15	@ Mars	W 95–85	Lasan Kromah (29)	Devin Williams (22)	Chiang Yu-An (8)	Xinzhuang Gymnasium; 3,198	1–1

Color： Win Lose
Schedule

== Taoyuan City Friendship Match ==
November 13, 2023
19:30 (UTC+8)

Taoyuan Pauian Pilots	71–97	Taiwan Beer Leopards

Taoyuan Arena, Taoyuan City

== Regular season ==
=== Standings ===
Pos	Team	Pld	W	L	PCT	GB	Qualification
1	New Taipei CTBC DEA	28	19	9	.679	—	Advance to semifinals
2	Taiwan Beer Leopards	28	18	10	.643	1	Advance to semifinals
3	Kaohsiung Aquas	28	15	13	.536	4	Advance to semifinals
4	Taipei Mars	28	11	17	.393	8	Advance to semifinals
5	Tainan TSG GhostHawks	28	7	21	.250	12	

Source: T1 League

=== Game log ===
2023–24 regular season game log
Total: 18–10 (home: 10–4; road: 8–6)
November : 3–1 (home: 3–1; road: 0–0)

Game	Date	Team	Score	High points	High rebounds	High assists	Location Attendance	Record
1	November 18	DEA	L 73–87	Lin Sin-Kuan (16)	Devin Williams (17)	Gao Jin-Wei (3); Chiang Yu-An (3)	Taoyuan Arena; 2,118	0–1
2	November 19	Mars	W 102–99	Lasan Kromah (29)	Devin Williams (14)	Gao Jin-Wei (6)	Taoyuan Arena; 1,688	1–1
3	November 25	Aquas	W 110–95	Lasan Kromah (25)	Devin Williams (18)	Lasan Kromah (10)	Taoyuan Arena; 1,023	2–1
4	November 26	GhostHawks	W 120–112	Lasan Kromah (27)	Devin Williams (16)	Lasan Kromah (12)	Taoyuan Arena; 1,524	3–1

December : 4–3 (home: 1–1; road: 3–2)

Game	Date	Team	Score	High points	High rebounds	High assists	Location Attendance	Record
5	December 2	Mars	L 104–111	Lasan Kromah (36)	Justyn Hamilton (16); Lasan Kromah (16)	Gao Jin-Wei (7)	Taoyuan Arena; 1,987	3–2
6	December 3	DEA	W 97–91	Lasan Kromah (21)	Devin Williams (15)	Lasan Kromah (7)	Taoyuan Arena; 1,826	4–2
7	December 9	@ Aquas	L 104–122	Lasan Kromah (30)	Devin Williams (25)	Lasan Kromah (7)	Kaohsiung Arena; 6,318	4–3
8	December 16	@ GhostHawks	L 97–108	Lasan Kromah (34)	Devin Williams (14); Justyn Hamilton (14)	Chiang Yu-An (8)	Chia Nan University of Pharmacy and Science Shao Tsung Gymnasium; 2,038	4–4
9	December 17	@ DEA	W 107–100	Gao Jin-Wei (30)	Devin Williams (23)	Lasan Kromah (10)	Xinzhuang Gymnasium; 4,202	5–4
10	December 24	@ Mars	W 109–102	Lasan Kromah (25)	Devin Williams (22)	Lasan Kromah (11)	Taipei Heping Basketball Gymnasium; 4,588	6–4
11	December 31	@ Mars	W 120–113	Devin Williams (32)	Devin Williams (11)	Gao Jin-Wei (9)	Taipei Heping Basketball Gymnasium; 3,663	7–4

January : 4–1 (home: 3–1; road: 1–0)

Game	Date	Team	Score	High points	High rebounds	High assists	Location Attendance	Record
12	January 6	@ Aquas	W 103–99	Devin Williams (28)	Devin Williams (25)	Gao Jin-Wei (6)	Kaohsiung Arena; 5,021	8–4
13	January 20	GhostHawks	W 119–90	Lasan Kromah (29)	Lasan Kromah (11)	Lasan Kromah (13)	Taoyuan Arena; 6,015	9–4
14	January 21	DEA	W 105–85	DeMarcus Cousins (25)	DeMarcus Cousins (17)	Lasan Kromah (8)	Taoyuan Arena; 5,515	10–4
15	January 27	Aquas	L 101–108	Lasan Kromah (26)	DeMarcus Cousins (15)	Gao Jin-Wei (9)	Taoyuan Arena; 6,215	10–5
16	January 28	GhostHawks	W 114–88	DeMarcus Cousins (30)	Devin Williams (33)	DeMarcus Cousins (5)	Taoyuan Arena; 6,125	11–5

February : 0–1 (home: 0–0; road: 0–1)

Game	Date	Team	Score	High points	High rebounds	High assists	Location Attendance	Record
17	February 18	@ Aquas	L 117–118	Chiang Yu-An (25)	Devin Williams (13)	Lasan Kromah (8)	Kaohsiung Arena; 6,123	11–6
—	February 24	@ DEA	Rescheduled to March 3					

March : 1–3 (home: 0–0; road: 1–3)

Game	Date	Team	Score	High points	High rebounds	High assists	Location Attendance	Record
18	March 3	@ DEA	L 90–95	Devin Williams (28)	Devin Williams (18)	Lasan Kromah (6)	Xinzhuang Gymnasium; 4,562	11–7
19	March 17	@ GhostHawks	L 93–108	Devin Williams (25)	Devin Williams (18)	Gao Jin-Wei (5)	Chia Nan University of Pharmacy and Science Shao Tsung Gymnasium; 1,568	11–8
20	March 23	@ DEA	W 104–97	Lasan Kromah (27)	Lasan Kromah (10)	Gao Jin-Wei (9)	Xinzhuang Gymnasium; 4,029	12–8
21	March 24	@ Mars	L 96–126	Gao Jin-Wei (26)	Devin Williams (12)	Lasan Kromah (8)	Taipei Heping Basketball Gymnasium; 4,672	12–9

April : 6–1 (home: 3–1; road: 3–0)

Game	Date	Team	Score	High points	High rebounds	High assists	Location Attendance	Record
22	April 4	@ DEA	W 104–94	Chiang Yu-An (30)	Devin Williams (21)	Lasan Kromah (8)	Xinzhuang Gymnasium; 4,190	13–9
23	April 7	@ GhostHawks	W 105–85	Lasan Kromah (29)	DeAndre Williams (13)	Chiang Yu-An (7); Lasan Kromah (7)	Chia Nan University of Pharmacy and Science Shao Tsung Gymnasium; 1,250	14–9
—	April 13	Mars	Rescheduled to April 20					
24	April 13	Aquas	W 117–78	Lasan Kromah (25)	Devin Williams (16)	Gao Jin-Wei (7); Lasan Kromah (7)	Taoyuan Arena; 2,567	15–9
25	April 14	GhostHawks	W 125–121	Lasan Kromah (44)	Devin Williams (19)	Chiang Yu-An (5)	Taoyuan Arena; 2,519	16–9
—	April 20	Aquas	Rescheduled to April 13					
26	April 20	Mars	W 101–96	DeMarcus Cousins (25)	Devin Williams (24)	Chiang Yu-An (8)	Taoyuan Arena; 4,015	17–9
27	April 21	Mars	L 79–91	DeMarcus Cousins (21)	DeMarcus Cousins (20)	Gao Jin-Wei (7)	Taoyuan Arena; 5,267	17–10
28	April 28	@ Aquas	W 113–109	DeMarcus Cousins (25)	DeMarcus Cousins (14)	Lasan Kromah (7)	Fengshan Arena; 4,577	18–10

Color： Win Lose Rescheduled
Schedule

=== Regular season note ===
- Due to the 2025 FIBA Asia Cup qualification, the T1 League declared that the games on February 24 would be rescheduled to March 3.
- Due to the second home arena application of New Taipei CTBC DEA, the T1 League declared that the games on April 13 and 20 would be rescheduled to April 20 and 13.

== 2024 Lioneers Masters Game ==
Recap

January 30, 2024
19:00 (UTC+8)

Taiwan Beer Leopards	81–84	Hsinchu Toplus Lioneers

Hsinchu County Stadium, Hsinchu County

== Playoffs ==
=== Game log ===
2024 playoffs game log
Total: 7–0 (home: 4–0; road: 3–0)
Semifinals : 3–0 (home: 2–0; road: 1–0)

Game	Date	Team	Score	High points	High rebounds	High assists	Location Attendance	Series
1	May 5	Aquas	W 90–76	DeMarcus Cousins (22)	DeMarcus Cousins (15)	DeMarcus Cousins (6)	Taoyuan Arena; 5,515	1–0
2	May 7	Aquas	W 107–98	Lasan Kromah (30)	Devin Williams (12)	Lasan Kromah (5)	Taoyuan Arena; 2,758	2–0
3	May 10	@ Aquas	W 113–111 (OT)	DeMarcus Cousins (37)	DeMarcus Cousins (18)	DeMarcus Cousins (5)	Fengshan Arena; 4,123	3–0

Finals : 4–0 (home: 2–0; road: 2–0)

Game	Date	Team	Score	High points	High rebounds	High assists	Location Attendance	Series
1	May 24	Mars	W 106–101	DeMarcus Cousins (30); Lasan Kromah (30)	DeMarcus Cousins (15)	Lasan Kromah (7)	Taoyuan Arena; 5,019	1–0
2	May 26	Mars	W 112–107	Gao Jin-Wei (27); DeMarcus Cousins (27)	DeMarcus Cousins (12)	Chiang Yu-An (4); Lasan Kromah (4)	Taoyuan Arena; 6,869	2–0
3	May 30	@ Mars	W 94–79	Chiang Yu-An (21); Lasan Kromah (21)	DeMarcus Cousins (15)	Lasan Kromah (7)	Taipei Heping Basketball Gymnasium; 3,754	3–0
4	June 1	@ Mars	W 108–80	Lasan Kromah (36)	DeMarcus Cousins (24)	Gao Jin-Wei (7)	Taipei Heping Basketball Gymnasium; 5,000	4–0

Color： Win Lose
Schedule

== Player statistics ==
Legend
GP	Games played	MPG	Minutes per game	FG%	Field goal percentage
3P%	3-point field goal percentage	FT%	Free throw percentage	RPG	Rebounds per game
APG	Assists per game	SPG	Steals per game	BPG	Blocks per game
PPG	Points per game		Led the league		Finals MVP

=== Regular season ===
Player	GP	MPG	PPG	FG%	3P%	FT%	RPG	APG	SPG	BPG
Chen Hsiao-Jung	18	4:46	1.2	28.0%	25.0%	50.0%	0.5	0.2	0.3	0.0
Cheng Wei	23	9:31	2.0	30.9%	30.0%	50.0%	0.3	0.5	0.1	0.0
Daniel Johnson^{≠‡}	8	18:25	7.0	47.5%	36.4%	87.5%	4.5	2.3	0.3	0.4
Gao Jin-Wei	28	35:15	14.3	42.1%	37.8%	81.1%	3.5	4.9	1.4	0.1
Lu Chieh-Min	9	3:08	0.7	33.3%	0.0%	0.0%	0.4	0.1	0.0	0.0
Chu I-Tsung	22	10:33	2.4	42.6%	37.5%	0.0%	1.3	0.6	0.4	0.0
Lin Sin-Kuan	24	26:21	10.5	39.7%	38.8%	81.8%	2.5	1.1	1.1	0.2
DeAndre Williams^{≠}	9	19:07	11.3	51.2%	9.1%	53.1%	6.2	2.3	1.8	0.9
Chiang Yu-An	20	36:48	15.6	44.2%	37.7%	77.5%	3.9	5.2	1.7	0.3
DeMarcus Cousins^{≠}	7	31:07	22.7	45.2%	32.6%	78.8%	12.7	4.4	1.7	1.3
Justyn Hamilton^{‡}	7	27:36	13.6	51.9%	0.0%	45.8%	10.7	0.7	1.1	1.7
Lasan Kromah	25	39:19	25.7	46.7%	32.2%	73.6%	7.8	6.5	3.0	0.6
Huang Jhen	26	13:56	4.1	46.3%	39.3%	58.3%	1.8	0.8	0.7	0.1
Wu Pei-Chia^{≠}	1	1:30	0.0	0.0%	0.0%	0.0%	1.0	0.0	0.0	0.0
Devin Williams	27	34:38	18.7	52.8%	9.5%	65.1%	16.6	1.6	0.8	0.2
Lee Chi-Wei	16	28:33	7.8	36.7%	30.0%	86.7%	2.5	1.3	0.4	0.3
Liu Yuan-Kai	26	12:37	1.9	39.0%	0.0%	85.7%	2.0	0.5	0.2	0.3

^{‡} Left during the season
^{≠} Acquired during the season

=== Semifinals ===
Player	GP	MPG	PPG	FG%	3P%	FT%	RPG	APG	SPG	BPG
Chen Hsiao-Jung	1	0:01	0.0	0.0%	0.0%	0.0%	0.0	0.0	0.0	0.0
Cheng Wei	1	2:19	0.0	0.0%	0.0%	0.0%	0.0	0.0	0.0	0.0
Gao Jin-Wei	2	37:55	15.5	42.9%	26.7%	100.0%	2.5	3.0	0.5	0.0
Lu Chieh-Min	Did not play									
Chu I-Tsung	1	3:43	0.0	0.0%	0.0%	0.0%	1.0	0.0	0.0	0.0
Lin Sin-Kuan	3	25:09	11.3	55.0%	60.0%	75.0%	4.0	1.3	2.7	0.0
DeAndre Williams	Did not play									
Chiang Yu-An	3	43:05	16.7	46.2%	47.1%	75.0%	2.3	3.0	3.0	0.3
DeMarcus Cousins	3	38:27	25.3	52.1%	18.8%	69.7%	14.0	4.7	2.0	2.0
Lasan Kromah	3	37:48	25.7	53.2%	33.3%	42.9%	3.7	3.7	5.7	0.0
Huang Jhen	3	9:34	1.7	50.0%	50.0%	0.0%	0.7	1.3	1.0	0.0
Wu Pei-Chia	Did not play									
Devin Williams	3	22:58	7.3	40.0%	0.0%	66.7%	10.0	1.0	0.3	0.3
Lee Chi-Wei	3	37:38	3.7	28.6%	27.3%	0.0%	3.0	1.3	1.0	0.3
Liu Yuan-Kai	3	6:21	1.3	100.0%	0.0%	0.0%	1.0	0.0	0.7	0.3

=== Finals ===
Player	GP	MPG	PPG	FG%	3P%	FT%	RPG	APG	SPG	BPG
Chen Hsiao-Jung	2	3:08	1.5	0.0%	0.0%	75.0%	0.5	0.0	0.0	0.0
Cheng Wei	2	2:15	0.5	0.0%	0.0%	50.0%	1.0	0.0	0.0	0.0
Gao Jin-Wei	4	35:11	16.8	49.0%	33.3%	91.7%	4.5	3.5	2.0	0.0
Lu Chieh-Min	2	1:45	0.0	0.0%	0.0%	0.0%	0.5	0.0	0.0	0.0
Chu I-Tsung	1	3:41	2.0	50.0%	0.0%	0.0%	1.0	0.0	0.0	0.0
Lin Sin-Kuan	4	27:30	5.0	36.4%	30.8%	0.0%	4.3	0.5	0.0	0.0
DeAndre Williams	1	9:46	2.0	0.0%	0.0%	100.0%	4.0	0.0	0.0	2.0
Chiang Yu-An	3	39:42	17.0	50.0%	45.0%	50.0%	4.0	4.0	1.7	0.0
DeMarcus Cousins	4	35:39	25.3	45.0%	20.0%	85.7%	16.5	2.0	1.8	1.8
Lasan Kromah	4	39:32	25.5	47.6%	44.0%	64.7%	4.5	5.8	3.5	0.5
Huang Jhen	4	8:05	3.0	30.8%	36.4%	0.0%	1.8	0.8	0.0	0.5
Wu Pei-Chia	Did not play									
Devin Williams	3	20:48	6.3	32.0%	0.0%	75.0%	6.3	1.3	0.7	0.3
Lee Chi-Wei	4	36:15	9.3	56.5%	52.6%	50.0%	2.3	1.5	0.8	0.5
Liu Yuan-Kai	4	5:25	0.8	50.0%	0.0%	50.0%	1.3	0.0	0.0	0.0

- Reference：

== Transactions ==
On March 18, 2024, Joof Alasan was not registered in the 2023–24 T1 League season final rosters.

=== Overview ===
Players added

Via draft

- Gao Jin-Wei
- Lin Sin-Kuan

Via free agency

- Joof Alasan
- DeMarcus Cousins
- Justyn Hamilton
- Daniel Johnson
- Lasan Kromah
- DeAndre Williams
- Devin Williams

Transfer from TaiwanBeer HeroBears

- Chiang Yu-An
- Huang Jhen
- Huang Tsung-Han
- Lee Chi-Wei

Transfer from Taiwan Beer

- Chu I-Tsung
- Wu Pei-Chia
Players lost

Via trade

- Huang Tsung-Han

Via free agency

- Chang Shun-Cheng
- Chen Chien-Ming
- Deyonta Davis
- Du Yu-Cheng
- Michael Efevberha
- Dwight Howard
- Huang Yi-Sheng
- Kao Shih-Chieh
- Richard Laku
- Lin Yi-Huei
- Liu Hung-Po
- Su Yi-Chieh
- Tsai Yang-Ming
- Tseng Pin-Fu
- Yu Chu-Hsiang

Waived

- Daniel Johnson
- Justyn Hamilton
- Lo Chen-Feng

End of loan

- Lu Tsai Yu-Lun

=== Trades ===
Date	Trade		Ref.
July 12, 2023	To TaiwanBeer Leopards: 2023 Taishin's first-round 2nd pick	To Taipei Taishin basketball team: Huang Tsung-Han; 2024 Leopards' first-round pick	

=== Transfer from TaiwanBeer HeroBears ===
Date	Player	Ref.
July 4, 2023	Chiang Yu-An	
July 4, 2023	Lee Chi-Wei	
July 4, 2023	Huang Jhen	

=== Transfer from Taiwan Beer ===
Date	Player	Ref.
November 10, 2023	Chu I-Tsung	
December 16, 2023	Wu Pei-Chia	

=== End of loan ===
Date	Player	Owner team	Loan season	Ref.
July 1, 2023	Lu Tsai Yu-Lun	TaiwanBeer HeroBears	2022–23 T1 League season	

=== Free agency ===
==== Re-signed ====
Date	Player	Contract terms	Ref.
March 18, 2024	DeMarcus Cousins	—N/a	

==== Additions ====
Date	Player	Contract terms	Former team	Ref.
July 20, 2023	Lin Sin-Kuan	—N/a	(Taiwan) NTNU	
July 20, 2023	Gao Jin-Wei	—N/a	(Taiwan) UCH	
August 4, 2023	Joof Alasan	—N/a	(Taiwan) NTUA	
September 1, 2023	Justyn Hamilton	—N/a	(Switzerland) Lugano Tigers	
September 26, 2023	Lasan Kromah	—N/a	(Spain) Baloncesto Fuenlabrada	
October 7, 2023	Devin Williams	—N/a	(China) Jiangsu Dragons	
December 8, 2023	Daniel Johnson	—N/a	(Australia) South East Melbourne Phoenix	
December 18, 2023	DeMarcus Cousins	1-month contract, worth unknown	(Puerto Rico) Mets de Guaynabo	
March 16, 2024	DeAndre Williams	—N/a	(Philippines) NLEX Road Warriors	

==== Subtractions ====
Date	Player	Reason	New team	Ref.
April 26, 2023	Su Yi-Chieh	Contract expired	—N/a	
July 4, 2023	Yu Chu-Hsiang	Contract expired	—N/a	
July 4, 2023	Du Yu-Cheng	Contract expired	—N/a	
July 4, 2023	Tsai Yang-Ming	Contract expired	—N/a	
July 4, 2023	Chang Shun-Cheng	Contract expired	—N/a	
July 4, 2023	Lin Yi-Huei	Contract expired	(Taiwan) Taipei Taishin	
July 4, 2023	Kao Shih-Chieh	Contract expired	—N/a	
July 4, 2023	Tseng Pin-Fu	Contract expired	(Taiwan) Taichung Suns	
July 4, 2023	Liu Hung-Po	Contract expired	—N/a	
July 4, 2023	Huang Yi-Sheng	Contract expired	—N/a	
July 17, 2023	Deyonta Davis	Contract expired	(Taiwan) Taichung Suns	
August 23, 2023	Michael Efevberha	Contract expired	(Taiwan) Hsinchu Lioneers	
October 7, 2023	Richard Laku	Contract expired	(Belize) San Pedro Tiger Sharks	
October 7, 2023	Dwight Howard	Contract expired	(Philippines) Strong Group Athletics	
October 10, 2023	Chen Chien-Ming	Contract expired	Taiwan Beer	
October 24, 2023	Lo Chen-Feng	Contract terminated	Permanent ban by T1 League	
December 28, 2023	Justyn Hamilton	Contract terminated	(United States) Oklahoma City Blue	
March 15, 2024	Daniel Johnson	Contract terminated	(Australia) Forestville Eagles	

== Awards ==
=== Yearly awards ===
Recipient	Award	Ref.
Lasan Kromah	Points Leader	
Lasan Kromah	Steals Leader	
Lasan Kromah	All-T1 League First Team	
Lasan Kromah	Most Valuable Import	
Devin Williams	Rebounds Leader	
Gao Jin-Wei	All-T1 League First Team	
Gao Jin-Wei	Rookie of the Year	
Chiang Yu-An	All-T1 League First Team	
Chiang Yu-An	All-Defensive First Team	
DeMarcus Cousins	Most Popular Player of the Year	
Yen Hsing-Su	General Manager of the Year	

=== Finals awards ===
Recipient	Award	Ref.
Taiwan Beer Leopards	Champion	
DeMarcus Cousins	Finals MVP	

=== MVP of the Month ===
Month	Recipient	Award	Ref.
November	Chiang Yu-An	November MVP of the Month	
April	Chiang Yu-An	April MVP of the Month	

=== Import of the Month ===
Month	Recipient	Award	Ref.
November	Lasan Kromah	November Import of the Month	
January	DeMarcus Cousins	January Import of the Month	
April	Lasan Kromah	April Import of the Month	
