= Brian Adams (basketball) =

American basketball coach

Alabama Crimson Tide
- Position: Assistant coach
- League: Southeastern Conference

Personal information
- Born: August 23 Pine Plains, New York, U.S.

Career information
- College: Connecticut College
- Coaching career: 2006–present

Career history

Coaching
- 2011–2013: Harvard (assistant)
- 2013–2014: Marist (assistant)
- 2014–2018: Agua Caliente Clippers (assistant)
- 2018–2020: Agua Caliente Clippers
- 2020–2023: Philadelphia 76ers (assistant)
- 2023: Taipei Mars
- 2024: Detroit Pistons (assistant)
- 2024–present: Alabama (assistant)

Brian Adams is an American basketball coach who is as an assistant coach for the University of Alabama. He grew up in the state of New York.

== Coaching career ==
=== College Coaching Career ===
Brian Adams was hired as coach for Harvard University and Marist College

=== Agua Caliente Clippers ===
On August 1, 2018, Adams was named the head coach after previously serving as a player development coach with the Los Angeles Clippers.

=== Philadelphia 76ers ===
On November 9, 2020, the Philadelphia 76ers hired Adams as a player development coach under Doc Rivers.

=== Taipei Mars ===
On September 14, 2023, the Taipei Taishin Mars named Adams as their new head coach. On December 31, the Taipei Mars announced that Adams resigned from head coach.

=== Detroit Pistons ===
On January 4, 2024, the Detroit Pistons named Adams as their new assistant coach. He was not kept by the team following the firing of Monty Williams.

=== Alabama Crimson Tide ===
He was hired by Alabama as an assistant coach in July 2024.
