= Rahlir Hollis-Jefferson =

American basketball player (born 1991)

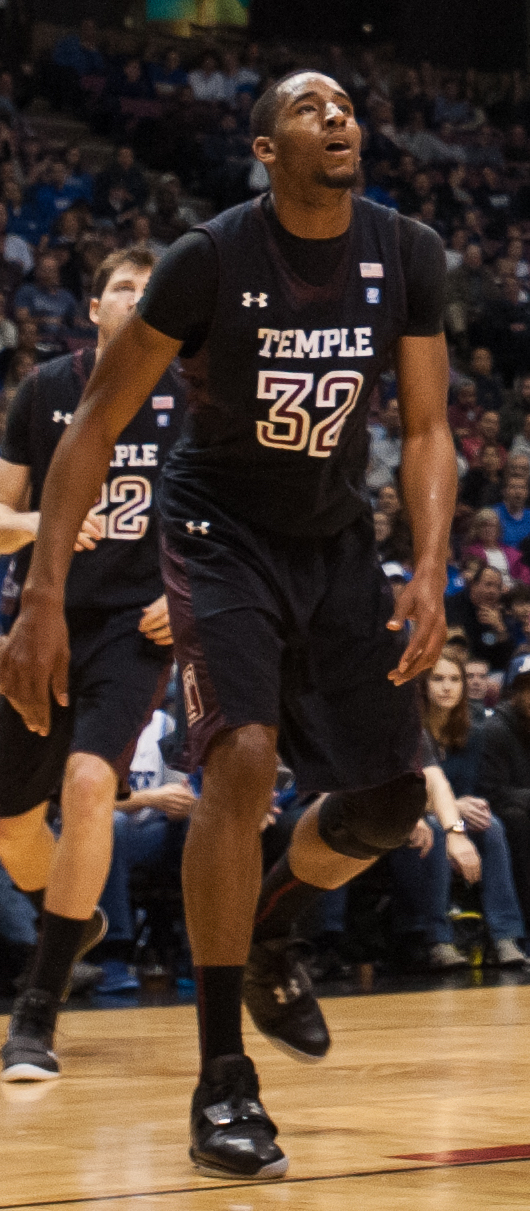

Free agent
- Position: Power forward

Personal information
- Born: June 26, 1991 (age 35) Chester, Pennsylvania, U.S.
- Listed height: 6 ft 6 in (1.98 m)
- Listed weight: 215 lb (98 kg)

Career information
- High school: Chester (Chester, Pennsylvania)
- College: Temple (2009–2013)
- NBA draft: 2013: undrafted
- Playing career: 2013–present

Career history
- 2013–2014: AB Contern
- 2014: Delaware 87ers
- 2016–2017: Orangeville A's
- 2017–2018: Northern Arizona Suns
- 2018–2019: Kataja
- 2019–2020: Memphis Hustle
- 2021–2023: Kataja
- 2023: OSE Lions
- 2023–2024: TNT Tropang Giga
- 2024: Taipei Mars
- 2026: Kataja
- 2026: TNT Tropang 5G

Rahlir Hollis-Jefferson (born June 26, 1991) is an American professional basketball player who last played for the TNT Tropang 5G of the Philippine Basketball Association (PBA). He played college basketball with the Temple Owls and has experience playing professionally in Luxembourg and Finland.

== High school career ==
Hollis-Jefferson played high school basketball at Chester High School in Chester, Pennsylvania. In his junior season, he averaged 10.5 points, 7.2 rebounds, 2.8 assists, and 2.1 blocks per game and lifted the Clippers to a win over Norristown High School to claim the PIAA Class AAAA state title. In the championship game, he faced Khalif Wyatt, his future Temple college teammate. The Philadelphia Inquirer named Hollis-Jefferson second team all-Southeastern Pennsylvania as well. As a senior, he averaged 17.6 points and 10.0 rebounds, recording 25 double-doubles in just 29 games.

== College career ==
Hollis-Jefferson played college basketball with the Temple Owls from 2009 to 2013. As a junior, he averaged 5.6 points and 5.3 rebounds per game. He improved those numbers to 9.3 points and 6.6 rebounds per game as a senior.

== Professional career ==
After leaving Temple, Hollis-Jefferson signed his first professional contract with AB Contern of the Total League in Luxembourg. He commented on the country, "It was pretty cool. I enjoyed the time there and the people were nice."

In 2014, Hollis-Jefferson returned to his home country to play for the Delaware 87ers of the NBA Development League. However, he received limited playing time.

On October 13, 2015, Hollis-Jefferson signed with the Saint John Mill Rats of the National Basketball League of Canada (NBL). However, he would never play a game for the team.

In 2016, Hollis-Jefferson signed with the Orangeville A's for the National Basketball League of Canada (NBL). At the end of the season, Hollis-Jefferson was named the Defensive Player of the Year for the league.

In October 2017, Hollis-Jefferson was drafted by the Northern Arizona Suns of the NBA G League. He averaged 9.8 points and 4.8 rebounds per game. On August 14, 2018, he signed with Kataja BC of the Finnish league.

For the 2019–20 season, Hollis-Jefferson was signed by the Memphis Hustle. He was waived on January 14, 2020, but was re-acquired by the Hustle two days later after Matt Mooney received a call-up. Hollis-Jefferson averaged 6.1 points, 3.7 rebounds, and 2.3 assists per game. He signed with Kataja on November 24, 2021.

On December 14, 2023, he signed with the TNT Tropang Giga of the Philippine Basketball Association (PBA) to replace Quincy Miller as one of the team's import for its participation in the 2023–24 East Asia Super League. He teamed up with his brother Rondae who is the other import for the team. However, Rahlir replaced his brother Rondae as the team's import for the 2023–24 PBA Commissioner's Cup due to the latter's injury.

On February 6, 2024, Hollis-Jefferson signed with the Taipei Mars of the T1 League. On May 4, Hollis-Jefferson had suffered the Achilles tendon rupture during the semifinals series game 1, and he would miss the remainder of the 2023–24 season. On December 23, Hollis-Jefferson returned to the Taipei Taishin Mars of the Taiwan Professional Basketball League (TPBL).

On March 16, 2025, the general manager of the Taipei Taishin Mars announced that Hollis-Jefferson left the team.

== Personal life ==
Rahlir is the older brother of fellow basketball player Rondae Hollis-Jefferson. His uncle, Karim Alexander, was murdered on August 5, 2008, and it was never solved.
