= Mindaugas Kupšas =

Lithuanian basketball player (born 1991)

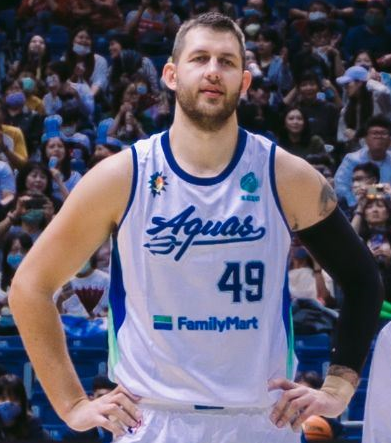
- Kupšas with Kaohsiung Aquas in December 2023

No. 49 – Chongde Flying Eagle
- Position: Center
- League: Hong Kong A1 Division Championship

Personal information
- Born: 9 April 1991 (age 35) Plikiškiai, Lithuania
- Listed height: 2.17 m (7 ft 1 in)
- Listed weight: 122 kg (269 lb)

Career information
- College: Lithuanian Sports University
- NBA draft: 2013: undrafted
- Playing career: 2008–present

Career history
- 2008–2015: Žalgiris Kaunas
- 2008–2011: →Žalgiris-Arvydas Sabonis school
- 2011–2012: →Baltai Kaunas
- 2012–2013: →Lietkabelis Panevėžys
- 2014–2015: →Kalev/Cramo
- 2015: Zepter Vienna
- 2015–2016: Nevėžis Kėdainiai
- 2016–2017: Vytautas Prienai–Birštonas
- 2017: Clavijo
- 2017–2018: Juventus Utena
- 2018: Chongqing Sanhai Lanling
- 2018–2019: Lietkabelis Panevėžys
- 2019–2020: Hapoel Jerusalem
- 2020: Filou Oostende
- 2020–2021: Juventus Utena
- 2021–2024: Kaohsiung Aquas
- 2024: Hefei Storm
- 2024–2025: BC Šiauliai
- 2025: Trotamundos de Carabobo
- 2025–2026: Yankey Ark
- 2026–present: Chongde Flying Eagle

Career highlights
- T1 League Defensive Player of the Year (2024); T1 League blocks leader (2024); T1 League All-Star (2023); 2× T1 League All-Defensive First Team (2022, 2024); T1 League champion (2022); LKL Champion (2014); Israeli State Cup winner (2020); Israeli League Cup winner (2019); Belgian League champion (2020)
Medals
Men's basketball
Representing Lithuania
Summer Universiade
Bronze medal – third place	2011 Shenzhen	National Team

Mindaugas Kupšas (born 9 April 1991) is a Lithuanian professional basketball player for Chongde Flying Eagle of the Hong Kong A1 Division Championship. Standing at 2.17 m (7 ft 1 1/2 in), he plays at the center position.

== Professional career ==
Kupšas played for Lietkabelis in the 2012–13 season and averaged 10.5 points, 5.5 rebounds and 0.8 blocks per 21 minutes of game action. He went undrafted at the 2013 NBA draft.

On 6 August 2014, Kupšas was loaned to the Estonian team BC Kalev/Cramo for the 2014–15 season.

On 14 August 2016, Kupšas signed with Vytautas Prienai–Birštonas. On 7 February 2017, he parted ways with Vytautas to join CB Clavijo of the Spanish LEB Oro.

On 10 August 2017, Kupšas signed a one-year deal with BC Juventus.

On 7 August 2018, Kupšas returned to Lietkabelis Panevėžys for a second stint, signing for the 2018–19 season. In 56 games played with Lietkabelis, he averaged 8.9 points and 4.7 rebounds, while shooting 62 percent from the field.

On 14 August 2019, Kupšas signed a one-year deal with Hapoel Jerusalem of the Israeli Premier League.

On 2 March 2020, Kupšas parted ways with Hapoel Jerusalem to join Filou Oostende of the Belgian Pro Basketball League.

On 1 October 2021, Kupšas signed with Kaohsiung Aquas of the T1 League. On 30 June 2022, Kupšas was selected to the all-defensive first team of the T1 League in 2021–22 season. On 20 July, Kupšas re-signed with the Kaohsiung Aquas. On 6 August 2023, Kupšas re-signed with the Kaohsiung Aquas. He was the league's blocks leader for the 2023–24 season. On 9 May 2024, Kupšas was selected to the T1 League all-defensive first team in 2023–24 season. On 10 May 2024, Kupšas awarded the T1 League Defensive Player of the Year in 2023–24 season.

On 27 June 2024, Kupšas signed one–year contract with Šiauliai of the Lithuanian Basketball League (LKL).
