= Nick King (basketball) =

American basketball player (born 1995)

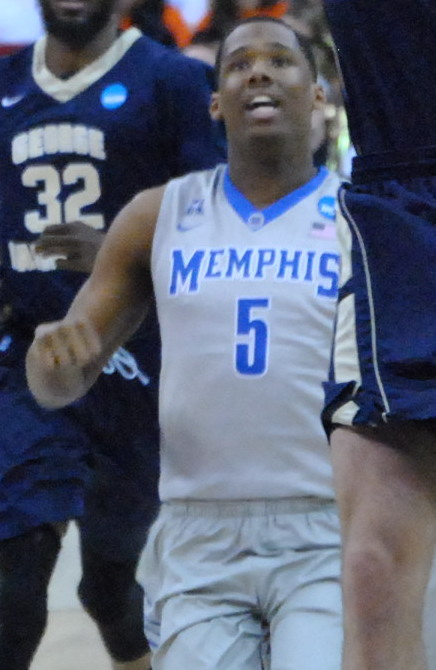
- King playing for Memphis in 2014

No. 5 – Nacional
- Position: Small forward
- League: Liga Uruguaya de Básquetbol

Personal information
- Born: August 5, 1995 (age 31) Memphis, Tennessee, U.S.
- Listed height: 6 ft 8 in (2.03 m)
- Listed weight: 231 lb (105 kg)

Career information
- High school: East (Memphis, Tennessee)
- College: Memphis (2013–2015); Alabama (2016–2017); Middle Tennessee (2017–2018)
- NBA draft: 2018: undrafted
- Playing career: 2018–present

Career history
- 2018–2019: Maine Red Claws
- 2019–2020: San Miguel Alab Pilipinas
- 2020: Tigrillos Medellín
- 2021: ZZ Leiden
- 2021–2022: Orlandina Basket
- 2022: Soles de Mexicali
- 2022–2023: Windy City Bulls
- 2023: New Taipei CTBC DEA
- 2023–2024: Tainan TSG GhostHawks
- 2024–2025: Taipei Fubon Braves
- 2026: New Taipei CTBC DEA
- 2026–present: Nacional

Career highlights
- T1 League champion (2023); DBL champion (2021); Conference USA Player of the Year (2018); First-team All-Conference USA (2018); Conference USA Newcomer of the Year (2018); First-team Parade All-American (2013); Class AAA Tennessee Mr. Basketball (2013)
- Stats at Basketball Reference

Nicholas Demario King (born August 5, 1995) is an American professional basketball player for the Nacional of the Liga Uruguaya de Básquetbol. He played college basketball for Memphis, Alabama and Middle Tennessee State.

== College career ==
King began his collegiate career at Memphis, where he averaged 5.9 points per game in two seasons. He transferred to Alabama, where he only suited up for seven games due to a lung infection. After his junior season at Alabama, King transferred again to Middle Tennessee State. In his senior season at Middle Tennessee State, King averaged 21.2 points and 8.4 rebounds per contest. He led the Blue Raiders to a regular season conference title and was named Conference USA Player of the Year and Newcomer of the Year. King set the single season school record for points.

== Professional career ==
After going undrafted in the 2018 NBA draft, King signed with the Los Angeles Lakers in the NBA Summer League. In 10 summer league games for the Lakers, King averaged 8.6 points and 4.7 rebounds per game. In September 2018, King signed a training camp deal with the Boston Celtics. On October 9, 2018, King was waived by the Celtics. He was signed by the Celtics' G League affiliate, the Maine Red Claws.

King signed with Philippines-based club San Miguel Alab Pilipinas, which plays in the ASEAN Basketball League, replacing Renaldo Balkman. In 16 games, he averaged 19.9 points, 8.5 rebounds, 3.8 assists and 1.1 steals per game. On October 23, 2020, King signed with Tigrillos Medellín of the Baloncesto Profesional Colombiano. In his debut, he had 39 points and seven rebounds in a win against Sabio, earning player of the week honors.

On February 14, 2021, King signed with ZZ Leiden of the Dutch Basketball League (DBL). He won the 2020–21 DBL championship with Leiden.

On August 6, 2021, King signed a one-year contract with Orlandina Basket in Italy.

=== Windy City Bulls (2022–2023) ===
On October 23, 2022, King joined the Windy City Bulls training camp roster. On January 13, 2023, King was waived.

=== New Taipei CTBC DEA (2023) ===
On January 30, 2023, King signed with New Taipei CTBC DEA of the T1 League. On August 5, the contract between King and New Taipei CTBC DEA was expired. In the regular season, he averaged 25.8 points, 7.6 rebounds, and 4.4 assists per game. He gets his first triple-double in Taiwan against TaiwanBeer HeroBears on 25 March 2023.

=== Tainan TSG GhostHawks (2023–2024) ===
On August 5, 2023, King signed with Tainan TSG GhostHawks of the T1 League.

=== Taipei Fubon Braves (2024–2025) ===
On July 23, 2024, King signed with Taipei Fubon Braves of the P. League+.

=== New Taipei CTBC DEA (2026) ===
On February 9, 2026, King returned to the New Taipei CTBC DEA of the Taiwan Professional Basketball League (TPBL). On March 9, King was not registered in the 2025–26 TPBL season final rosters.

=== Nacional (2026–present) ===
On August 27, 2026, King signed with the Nacional of the Liga Uruguaya de Básquetbol.

== Career statistics ==
Legend
GP	Games played	GS	Games started	MPG	Minutes per game
FG%	Field goal percentage	3P%	3-point field goal percentage	FT%	Free throw percentage
RPG	Rebounds per game	APG	Assists per game	SPG	Steals per game
BPG	Blocks per game	PPG	Points per game	**Bold**	Career high

=== College ===
Year	Team	GP	GS	MPG	FG%	3P%	FT%	RPG	APG	SPG	BPG	PPG
2013–14	Memphis	**34**	0	11.1	**.518**	.313	.518	3.3	.4	.5	**.3**	4.9
2014–15	Memphis	28	7	18.9	.404	.250	.635	4.8	1.0	.6	**.3**	7.2
2015–16	Alabama	Redshirt										
2016–17	Alabama	7	2	12.7	.320	.231	.667	2.9	.4	**.7**	**.3**	3.3
2017–18	Middle Tennessee	33	**33**	**32.9**	.495	**.389**	**.732**	**8.4**	**2.0**	**.7**	.2	**21.0**
Career		102	42	20.4	.473	.348	.658	5.3	1.1	.6	.3	10.6
