= Michael Olson =

American basketball player and coach

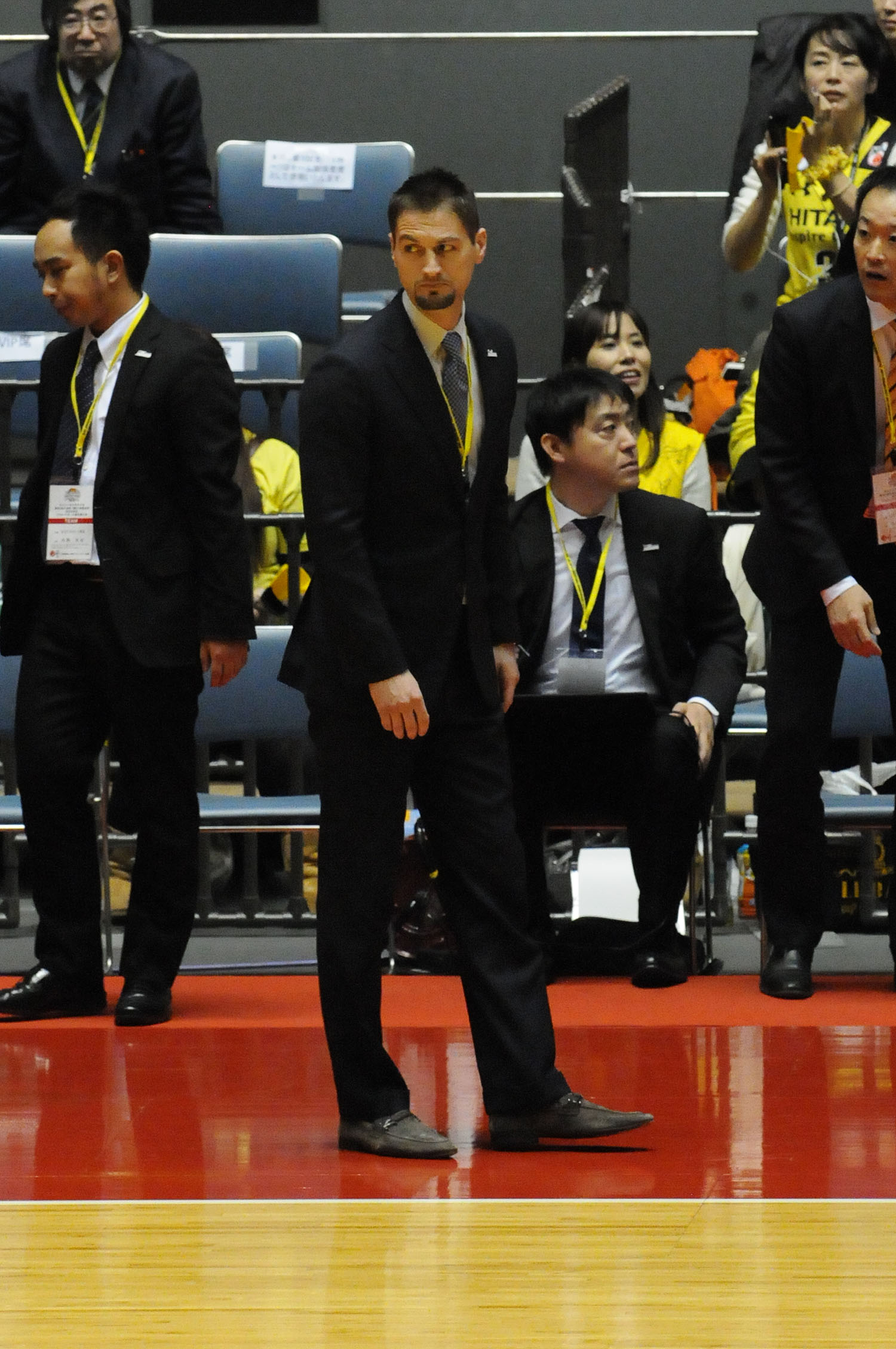

Personal information
- Born: June 5, 1979 (age 47) Portland, Oregon

Career information
- College: California State Stanislaus
- Coaching career: 2009–present

Career history

Playing
- 2006–2009: Eminecross Excellence

Coaching
- 2009–2010: Link Tochigi Brex (Asst)
- 2012–2013: Revova Kagoshima
- 2013–2014: Tokyo Excellence
- 2014–2016: Hitachi SunRockers
- 2016: San Antonio Spurs Summer League (Asst)
- 2017: Nike Hoop Summit (Asst)
- 2018–2019: Tokyo Hachioji Bee Trains (Advisor)
- 2023–2024: Taiwan Beer Leopards
- 2025: Chinese Taipei (Women)

Michael Olson (マイケル オルソン, Maikeru Oruson) is an American coach.

On August 14, 2023, Olson signed with the TaiwanBeer Leopards of the T1 League as head coach.
