= Domagoj Vuković =

Croatian basketball player

No. 71 – Cibona
- Position: Power forward
- League: Premijer liga

Personal information
- Born: October 29, 1993 (age 33) Rijeka, Croatia
- Listed height: 2.08 m (6 ft 10 in)
- Listed weight: 100 kg (220 lb)

Career information
- Playing career: 2011–present

Career history
- 2011–2013: Split
- 2013–2015: Zagreb
- 2015–2016: Zabok
- 2016–2017: Vrijednosnice Osijek
- 2017–2022: Zadar
- 2022–2024: Cibona
- 2024: Tainan TSG GhostHawks
- 2025: Cibona
- 2025: Giessen 46ers
- 2025–2026: Dubrava
- 2026–present: Cibona

Career highlights
- Croatian League champion (2021); 3× Croatian Cup winner (2020, 2021, 2023)

Domagoj Vuković (born October 29, 1993) is a Croatian professional basketball player for Cibona Zagreb of the Premijer liga.

== Professional career ==
A native of Rijeka, he started playing basketball in his home town clubs before joining the Nikola Vujčić Academy. His first professional contract was with Split. After playing for Split, Zagreb and Zabok in August 2016 he joined another A-1 Liga team: Vrijednosnice Osijek. After spending a season there in August 2017 he moved to Zadar. After averaging 10 points and 7.5 rebounds per game during the 2019–20 season, Vuković had his contract with Zadar extended for two years on May 20, 2020.

In April, 2022, Vuković fell to an injury of his achilles tendon which kept him off the court for more than six months. In November, 2022, Vuković signed with Cibona of the Croatian League and ABA League.

In February, 2024, Vuković left the financially-troubled Cibona for a more lucrative contract with the Taiwanese Tainan TSG GhostHawks playing in the T1 League. He signed a contract for the remainder of the 2023–24 season.

In September 2024, Vuković signed again with Cibona.

On July 15, 2025, he signed with Giessen 46ers of the ProA.

== National team career ==
He was a member of the youth Croatia national basketball team selections and played at the 2011 FIBA Europe Under-18 Championship and 2012 FIBA Europe Under-20 Championship (Division B).

In 2018 he was called up for the senior B selection that played the Stankovic Cup in China.
