= Danny Pippen =

American basketball player (born 1997)

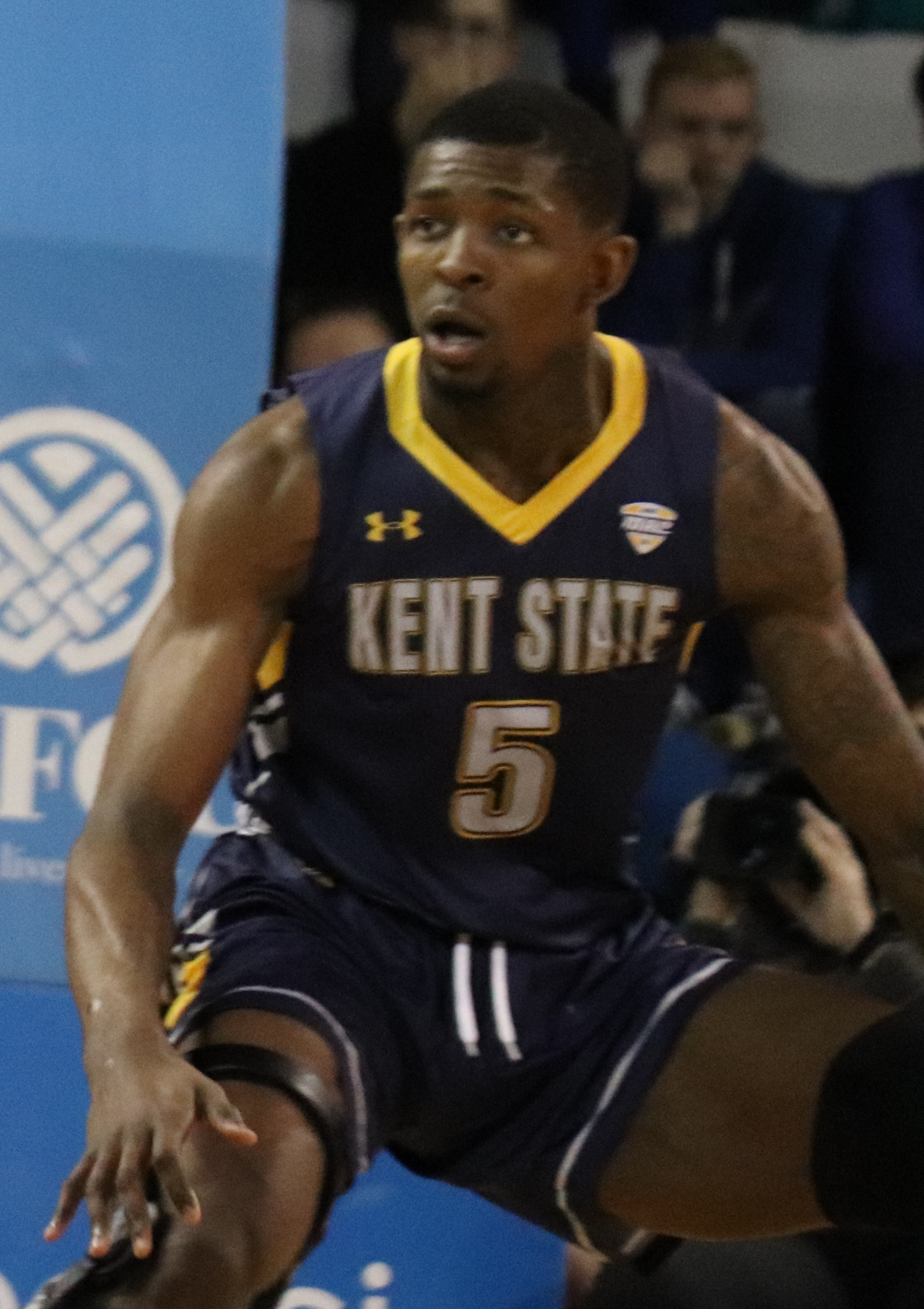
- Pippen with Kent State in 2020

Free agent
- Position: Power forward

Personal information
- Born: November 12, 1997 (age 29)
- Listed height: 6 ft 9 in (2.06 m)
- Listed weight: 222 lb (101 kg)

Career information
- High school: Allen Academy (Detroit, Michigan)
- College: Kent State (2016–2021)
- NBA draft: 2021: undrafted
- Playing career: 2021–present

Career history
- 2021: Greensboro Swarm
- 2021: Maine Celtics
- 2022: Lavrio
- 2022–2023: Kobrat
- 2023: Manawatu Jets
- 2023: Champville
- 2023–2024: Taipei Mars
- 2026: Goldfields Giants

Career highlights
- First-team All-MAC (2021)

Danny Pippen (born November 12, 1997) is an American professional basketball player who last played for the Goldfields Giants of the NBL1 West. He played college basketball for the Kent State Golden Flashes.

== High school career ==
Pippen attended Allen Academy in Detroit, Michigan and played alongside Rocket Watts. As a junior, he averaged 16 points and eight rebounds per game. Pippen averaged 12.8 points and 12.5 rebounds per game as a senior, earning First Team Class C honors. He finished as Allen's career leader in blocks with 174. Pippen committed to playing college basketball for Kent State.

== College career ==
Pippen came off the bench as a freshman and averaged 3 points and 2.7 rebounds per game. As a sophomore, he averaged 8.1 points, 6.8 rebounds and 1.6 blocks per game. Pippen sat out the 2018–19 season as a redshirt after undergoing microfracture surgery on his right knee. During his junior season, he played through pain due to a torn meniscus on his other knee, and only missed one game against Buffalo due to a back problem. Pippen averaged 14.3 points, 7.1 rebounds and 1.5 blocks per game, earning Honorable Mention All-MAC accolades. He underwent microfracture surgery on his left knee in March 2020. On January 5, 2021, Pippen scored a career-high 34 points to go with 16 rebounds and four blocks in an 84–82 loss to Toledo. He tied his career-high of 34 points on January 27, to go with 11 rebounds and surpassed 1,000 points in a 96–91 win against Bowling Green. As a senior, Pippen averaged 19.3 points, 8.7 rebounds and 1.3 blocks per game, and led the MAC in double-doubles with nine. He was named to the First Team All-MAC.

== Professional career ==
In October 2021, Pippen joined the Greensboro Swarm of the NBA G League after a successful tryout. He appeared in one game for the Swarm before being waived on December 17, 2021. He was acquired by the Maine Celtics on December 19, played in two games for the team, and was then waived again on December 21.

On January 29, 2022, Pippen signed with Lavrio of the Greek Basket League. He appeared in three games for Lavrio between January 30 and March 6.

On August 25, 2022, Pippen signed with Kobrat of the Finnish Korisliiga. Following the Korisliiga season, he joined the Manawatu Jets of the New Zealand National Basketball League for the 2023 season.

Pippen began the 2023–24 season in Lebanon with Champville before moving to Taiwan in November 2023 to play for the Taipei Mars of the T1 League. His contract with Taipei Mars was terminated on January 17, 2024.

In February 2026, Pippen signed with the Goldfields Giants of the NBL1 West in Australia for the 2026 season. He parted ways with the Giants on May 18 after injuring his calf and returning to the United States.

== Career statistics ==
Legend
GP	Games played	GS	Games started	MPG	Minutes per game
FG%	Field goal percentage	3P%	3-point field goal percentage	FT%	Free throw percentage
RPG	Rebounds per game	APG	Assists per game	SPG	Steals per game
BPG	Blocks per game	PPG	Points per game	**Bold**	Career high

=== College ===
Year	Team	GP	GS	MPG	FG%	3P%	FT%	RPG	APG	SPG	BPG	PPG
2016–17	Kent State	29	12	10.0	.397	.259	.594	2.7	.2	.2	.6	3.0
2017–18	Kent State	**33**	23	21.8	**.409**	**.355**	.803	6.8	.6	.4	**1.6**	8.1
2018–19	Kent State	Redshirt										
2019–20	Kent State	31	**28**	29.0	.406	.326	.772	7.1	1.7	.4	1.5	14.3
2020–21	Kent State	20	19	**31.9**	.403	.308	**.806**	**8.7**	**2.8**	**.8**	1.3	**19.3**
Career		113	82	22.5	.405	.322	.771	6.1	1.2	.4	1.3	10.5

== Personal life ==
Pippen is the son of Tiffaney Reeves. As of December 2020, his father was imprisoned at the Chillicothe Correctional Institution on a drug trafficking conviction.
