= Lasan Kromah =

American basketball player (born 1991)

Taipei Fubon Braves
- Position: Small forward / shooting guard

Personal information
- Born: June 24, 1991 (age 35) Queens, New York, U.S.
- Listed height: 6 ft 6 in (1.98 m)
- Listed weight: 201 lb (91 kg)

Career information
- High school: Eleanor Roosevelt (Greenbelt, Maryland)
- College: George Washington (2009–2013); UConn (2013–2014)
- NBA draft: 2014: undrafted
- Playing career: 2014–present

Career history
- 2014–2015: Alba Fehérvár
- 2015: Torku Konyaspor
- 2016: Kavala
- 2016: Westchester Knicks
- 2016: Promitheas Patras
- 2017: Melbourne United
- 2017: Egis Körmend
- 2017–2018: U-BT Cluj-Napoca
- 2018: Boulazac Basket Dordogne
- 2018–2019: Rouen Métropole
- 2019–2020: Kolossos Rodou
- 2020–2021: Cholet Basket
- 2021–2022: Fos Provence Basket
- 2022–2023: Fuenlabrada
- 2023–2026: Taiwan Beer Leopards / Taoyuan Taiwan Beer Leopards
- 2026: Taipei Fubon Braves

Career highlights
- T1 League champion (2024); TPBL Most Valuable Import (2026); T1 League Most Valuable Import (2024); 2×All-TPBL First Team (2025, 2026); All-T1 League First Team (2024); TPBL All-Defensive First Team (2026); TPBL All-Defensive Second Team (2025); 2× TPBL points leader (2025, 2026); T1 League points leader (2024); 2× TPBL steals leader (2025, 2026); T1 League steals leader (2024); LNB Pro B Best Scorer (2019); NCAA champion (2014); Atlantic 10 All-Rookie team (2010)

Lasannah V. "Lasan" Kromah (born June 24, 1991) is an American professional basketball player who last played for the Taoyuan Taiwan Beer Leopards of the Taiwan Professional Basketball League (TPBL). He played college basketball for George Washington University and Connecticut.

== High school career ==
Kromah attended Eleanor Roosevelt High School in Greenbelt, Maryland. As a senior, he averaged 21 points, 9 rebounds, and 2 steals per game under coach Brendan O'Connell, going on to be named first team All-County by the Prince George's Gazette and All-Met fourth team by the Washington Post. On August 11, 2026, Taipei Fubon Braves announced today that they have officially signed Lasannah Kromah.

== College career ==
Kromah was recruited by Karl Hobbs to George Washington University after a stellar high school career. He was named to the Atlantic-10 all rookie team after averaging 11.8 points per game during his freshman season at GW. Heading into his sophomore season, Kromah was a Preseason Atlantic 10 Third Team All-Conference Selection. However, after suffering a left foot injury during a preseason scrimmage, Kromah was forced to sit out the entire 2010–11 season. As a junior in 2011–12, he averaged 11.1 points, 5.1 rebounds, 2.5 assists, 1.7 steals and 29.4 minutes in 31 games. He led George Washington and ranked seventh in the A-10 in steals (52), second on team in scoring (345), assists (79), rebounds (159) and blocks (18). As a senior in 2012–13, Kromah played in all 30 games with 11 starts. He was second on the team with 10.1 points in 24.5 minutes per game. He finished his George Washington career with over 1,000 points, the 44th player in program history to accomplish that feat.

Kromah later reunited with Hobbs, who became an assistant at UConn, and joined the Huskies as a graduate student with one season of eligibility remaining after playing three years and earning a degree in Criminal Justice from George Washington University. In 2013–14, he appeared in all 40 games for the Huskies, starting 17, while averaging 6.1 points and 2.7 rebounds per game. The Huskies went on to win 2014 NCAA championship.

== Professional career ==
After going undrafted in the 2014 NBA draft, Kromah joined the Brooklyn Nets for the 2014 NBA Summer League. On August 11, 2014, he signed with Alba Fehérvár of Hungary for the 2014–15 season.

On June 29, 2015, Kromah signed with Torku Konyaspor of the Turkish Basketball League. He left Konyaspor in December 2015, and the following month, he signed with Greek team Kavala.

On October 30, 2016, Kromah was selected by the Westchester Knicks in the third round of the 2016 NBA Development League draft. He joined the team for the 2016–17 season, but was waived on November 18, 2016, after appearing in two games. Later that month, he returned to Greece and signed with Promitheas Patras. He appeared in two games for Promitheas before leaving the team in late December. On January 13, 2017, he signed with Melbourne United for the rest of the 2016–17 NBL season as an injury replacement for Ramone Moore.

On August 12, 2019, Kromah returned to Greece and signed with Kolossos Rodou. He averaged 15.7 points, 3.9 rebounds and 2.2 assists per game. On August 4, 2020, Kromah signed with Cholet Basket of the LNB Pro A. He was named player of the week on October 2, after posting 22 points and six assists against Élan Chalon.

On August 10, 2021, he has signed with Fos Provence Basket of the LNB Pro A.

On August 17, 2022, he has signed with Fuenlabrada of the Liga ACB.

On September 26, 2023, Kromah has signed with TaiwanBeer Leopards of the T1 League. He was the league's points leader and steals leader for the 2023–24 season. On May 8, 2024, Kromah was selected to the all-T1 League first team in 2023–24 season. On May 25, Kromah awarded the Most Valuable Import of the T1 League in 2023–24 season.

On August 9, 2024, Kromah re-signed with the Taoyuan Taiwan Beer Leopards of the Taiwan Professional Basketball League (TPBL). He was the league's points leader and steals leader for the 2024–25 season. On June 2, 2025, Kromah was selected to the All-Defensive Second Team of the TPBL in 2024–25 season. On June 6, Kromah was selected to the All-TPBL First Team in 2024–25 season.

On July 14, 2025, Kromah re-signed with the Taoyuan Taiwan Beer Leopards of the Taiwan Professional Basketball League (TPBL). He was the league's points leader and steals leader for the 2025–26 season. On May 9, 2026, Kromah was selected to the All-Defensive First Team of the TPBL in 2025–26 season. On May 10, Kromah awarded the Most Valuable Import of the TPBL in 2025–26 season. On May 11, Kromah was selected to the All-TPBL First Team in 2025–26 season. On July 30, the Taoyuan Taiwan Beer Leopards announced that Kromah left the team.

On August 11, 2026, Taipei Fubon Braves announced that they have officially signed Lasannah Kromah.

== Personal life ==
Kromah is the son of Al and Shewvan Kromah, and has an older brother, Adam, and an older sister, Manyuan.
