= Egidijus Mockevičius =

Lithuanian basketball player (born 1992)

No. 25 – Hong Kong Eastern
- Position: Center
- League: East Asia Super League

Personal information
- Born: 1 September 1992 (age 34) Kuršėnai, Lithuania
- Listed height: 6 ft 10 in (2.08 m)
- Listed weight: 237 lb (108 kg)

Career information
- College: Evansville (2012–2016)
- NBA draft: 2016: undrafted
- Playing career: 2010–present

Career history
- 2010–2012: Akademija Vilnius
- 2016–2017: Long Island Nets
- 2017–2018: Lietuvos rytas
- 2018–2019: VL Pesaro
- 2019–2020: Fuenlabrada
- 2020–2021: Le Mans Sarthe
- 2022: Fos Provence Basket
- 2022–2023: ABC Athletic Constanța
- 2023: BC Wolves
- 2023–2024: VL Pesaro
- 2024: Tainan TSG GhostHawks
- 2024: El Calor de Cancún
- 2024-2025: Taoyuan Taiwan Beer Leopards
- 2025: Club Atlético Aguada
- 2025–2026: Neptūnas Klaipėda
- 2026: Goyang Sono Skygunners
- 2026–present: Hong Kong Eastern

Career highlights
- Lega Basket Serie A rebounding leader (2019); NCAA rebounding leader (2016); 2× First-team All-MVC (2015, 2016); MVC Defensive Player of the Year (2016)
- Stats at Basketball Reference
Medals
Men's basketball
Representing Lithuania
FIBA Europe Under-20 Championship
Gold medal – first place	2012 Slovenia	Team
FIBA World Under-19 Championship
Gold medal – first place	2011 Latvia	Team
FIBA Europe Under-18 Championship
Gold medal – first place	2010 Lithuania	Team
European Youth Olympic Festival
Gold medal – first place	2007 Serbia	Team competition

Egidijus Mockevičius (born 1 September 1992) is a Lithuanian professional basketball player for the Hong Kong Eastern of the East Asia Super League (EASL). He played college basketball for the University of Evansville.

== Early life ==
Before joining Evansville, Mockevičius played for Akademija Vilnius in Lithuania. There he played for two seasons, averaging 14.3 points and 7.6 rebounds while shooting a 71% from the floor in his last season.

== College career ==
In his third year, Mockevičius averaged 12.5 points and 9.9 rebounds, accumulating a total of 20 double-doubles. He finished the season with a powerful 27 point and 12 rebound performance. On 28 November 2015 Mockevičius grabbed a career-high 21 rebounds. On 2 January 2016 he repeated this achievement. Following his fourth and final season, he was named defensive MVP of the conference and was included into the first-team All-MVC for a second straight season. In his fourth NCAA season, he averaged 15.7 points, 14 rebounds and 2.8 blocks per game.

== Professional career ==
After going undrafted in the 2016 NBA draft, Mockevičius joined the Brooklyn Nets for the 2016 NBA Summer League. On 5 August 2016 he signed with the Nets, but was later waived on October 18 after appearing in one preseason game. On 1 November he was acquired by the Long Island Nets of the NBA Development League as an affiliate player of the Nets. On November 11, he made his professional debut in a 123–94 loss to the Windy City Bulls, recording eight points, three rebounds, one assist, one steal and three blocks in 22 minutes off the bench.

On 30 September 2017 Mockevičius signed a three-year deal with Lietuvos rytas Vilnius, but was not able to play from the start of the season due to injury. On 5 July 2018 Mockevičius' contract was terminated by the team.

On 25 July 2018 Mockevičius signed a one-year contract with VL Pesaro of the Italian Lega Basket Serie A (LBA). He would go on to lead the league in rebounds per game during the 2018–19 season. On 7 August 2019 Mockevičius signed a two-year deal with Spanish club Montakit Fuenlabrada.

On 25 June 2020 he signed with Le Mans Sarthe of the French LNB Pro A.

On 1 March 2022 he signed with Fos Provence Basket of the LNB Pro A.

On 21 September 2023 Mockevičius signed a short-term contract with BC Wolves of the Lithuanian Basketball League (LKL).

On 27 October 2023 Mockevičius signed with VL Pesaro of the Lega Basket Serie A (LBA), returning for a second stint.

On 21 February 2024 Mockevičius signed with Tainan TSG GhostHawks of the T1 League. On 21 December Mockevičius signed with the Taoyuan Taiwan Beer Leopards of the Taiwan Professional Basketball League (TPBL).

On August 12, 2025, the Taoyuan Taiwan Beer Leopards announced that Mockevičius left the team.

On 1 December 2025, Mockevičius signed a contract until 15 January 2026 with an option to extend contract until 2025–26 season end with Neptūnas Klaipėda of the Lithuanian Basketball League (LKL) and the EuroCup. However, on 13 January 2026, Mockevičius left Neptūnas Klaipėda.

== National team career ==
Mockevičius won four gold medals with Lithuania national teams: European Youth Summer Olympic Festival (U-15) in 2007, Europe U-18 in 2010, World U-19 in 2011 and Europe U-20 in 2012.

Mockevičius played for the Lithuania national team during 2019 FIBA World Cup qualifiers.

== Career statistics ==
Legend
GP	Games played	GS	Games started	MPG	Minutes per game
FG%	Field-goal percentage	3P%	3-point field-goal percentage	FT%	Free-throw percentage
RPG	Rebounds per game	APG	Assists per game	SPG	Steals per game
BPG	Blocks per game	PPG	Points per game	PIR	Performance index rating
**Bold**	Career high

=== EuroCup ===
Year	Team	GP	GS	MPG	FG%	3P%	FT%	RPG	APG	SPG	BPG	PPG	PIR
2017–18	Lietuvos rytas Vilnius	**8**	2	14.2	**.667**	.000	.615	6.1	**.7**	.4	**.6**	6.0	9.1
2023–24	Wolves	3	0	11.7	.643	.000	.000	3.7	.0	.0	.0	6.0	5.7
2025–26	Neptūnas Klaipėda	6	**3**	**19.8**	**.667**	.000	**.765**	**6.7**	.5	**.7**	.2	**6.8**	**11.3**
Career		17	5	15.7	.662	.000	.656	5.9	.5	.4	.4	6.3	9.3
