= Chiang Yu-an =

Taiwanese basketball player

No. 14 – Formosa Dreamers
- Position: Point guard
- League: Taiwan Professional Basketball League

Personal information
- Born: August 4, 1991 (age 35) Taichung City, Taiwan
- Listed height: 1.74 m (5 ft 9 in)
- Listed weight: 75 kg (165 lb)

Career information
- High school: Youth Senior High School
- College: National Taiwan University of Sport
- SBL draft: 2014: 1st round, 5th overall pick
- Drafted by: Taiwan Beer
- Playing career: 2014–present

Career history
- 2014–2021: Taiwan Beer
- 2019: Anhui Wenyi
- 2021–2023: TaiwanBeer HeroBears
- 2023: Anhui Wenyi
- 2023–2024: Taiwan Beer Leopards
- 2024–present: Formosa Dreamers

Career highlights
- TPBL champion (2026); T1 League championship (2024); 3×SBL championship (2016, 2020, 2021); SBL Finals MVP (2020); T1 League MVP (2022); 2×SBL MVP (2019, 2020); SBL Defensive Player of the Year (2020); 3×All-T1 League First Team (2022–2024); 2×T1 League All-Defensive First Team (2022, 2024); 2×All-SBL First Team (2019, 2020); All-TPBL Second Team (2026); T1 League All-Star (2023); 5×SBL All-Star (2015–2019)
Medals
Men's basketball
Representing Chinese Taipei
EABA Championship
Gold medal – first place	2017 Nagano

Chiang Yu-an (Chinese: 蔣淯安; born 4 August 1991, in Taichung) is a Taiwanese basketball player for the Formosa Dreamers of the Taiwan Professional Basketball League (TPBL).

== Career ==
On September 12, 2014, Chiang Yu-an was selected by the Taiwan Beer as the fifth pick in the first round of the 2014 SBL Draft. He then joined Taiwan Beer.

On December 4, 2018, Chiang Yu-an won the November MVP and the third-week MVP in the 2018 SBL season.

On June 19, 2020, Chiang Yu-an renewed his contract with Taiwan Beer, signing a four-year extension.

In September 2021, Chiang Yu-an transferred to the TaiwanBeer HeroBears of the T1 League. On December 4, against the New Taipei CTBC DEA, he made a game-winning three-pointer at the buzzer in overtime, helping the TaiwanBeer HeroBears secure their first win in the T1 League with a 95-94 victory.

On January 6, 2022, Chiang Yu-an was named the MVP of December for the 2021–22 T1 League season. On March 7, he was named the MVP of February for the 2021–22 season. On June 30, Chiang Yu-an was selected for the All-Defensive First Team. On July 2, he was selected for the All-T1 League First Team. On July 4, he was named the Most Valuable Player of the 2021–22 season.

On August 1, 2023, Chiang Yu-an signed with the Taiwan Beer Leopards of the T1 League.

On June 30, 2024, the Taiwan Beer Leopards announced that the contract with Chiang Yu-an was expired. On July 2, Chiang Yu-an signed with the Formosa Dreamers of the P. League+ on a 5-year contract.

On May 11, 2026, Chiang Yu-an was selected to the All-TPBL Second Team in 2025–26 season.
