= Sahasombhop Srisomvongse =

Thai boxing manager and promoter

- Thai: สหสมภพ ศรีสมวงศ์
- Born: March 31, 1939; Pathum Wan, Bangkok
- Died: December 28, 2000 (aged 61); Bangkok
- Education: Thammasat University (TU)
- Occupation: Boxing promoter
- Years active: 1970s–2000
- Known for: Promoter and co-manager of Thai WBC world champions in the 1980s and 1990s Founder and first president of ABCO
- Notable work: Humberto González vs. Saman Sorjaturong
- Television: Suek Daorung TV Si Jed Mung Champion Lok

Sahasombhop Srisomvongse (Thai: สหสมภพ ศรีสมวงศ์; formerly: Sombhop; สมภพ) was a Thai boxing manager and promoter. Nicknamed "Big Ung" (บิ๊กอึ่ง).

Srisomvongse was born on March 31, 1939, into a Thai-Chinese family in the Pathum Wan neighbourhood of Bangkok. He graduated from Vajiravudh College and earned a bachelor's degree in law from Thammasat University.

In 1967, he became one of the co-founders of Channel 7 (present-day Channel 7 HD), and was among the individuals who formally submitted the application to establish the station.

He began his career in combat sports as an assistant to the renowned promoter Tiamboon "The Great Eagle" Inthrarabutr, who was best known for guiding Saensak Muangsurin to world championship fame, helping to organise Muay Thai events on Channel 7 in the early 1970s. Srisomvongse also operated his own boxing gym, named "Sor Chitalada," located in Soi Saensuk on Rama IV road in the Khlong Toei district, situated on a plot of land he owned personally.

In the early 1980s, he served as the World Boxing Council (WBC)'s official agent in Thailand. He later became the founder of the Asian Boxing Council (ABCO) and was unanimously elected as its first president in 1985. He played a vital role in supporting many Thai boxers in their journey to becoming WBC world champions, starting with Payao Poontarat, the 1976 Olympic bronze medalist, who won the title in 1983 after defeating Rafael Orono at the Grand Jomtien Palace Hotel in Pattaya.

Srisomvongse also co-managed numerous Thai fighters who went on to become world champions, including Sot Chitalada, Samart Payakaroon, Napa Kiatwanchai, Muangchai Kittikasem, Saman Sorjaturong, Sirimongkol Singwangcha, Chatchai Sasakul, Wandee Singwangcha, Veeraphol Sahaprom and Medgoen Singsurat. Additionally, he managed several boxers who, although never becoming world champions, successfully challenged for world titles or earned regional and international titles, such as Rocky Chitalada, Mai Thomburifarm, Asawin Sordusit, Saming Kiatpetch, Torsak Pongsupa, Pone Saengmorakot. Notably, most of his fighters were trained by Charles Atkinson, a well-known trainer from England.

In mid-1995, during the legendary bout between Humberto González and Saman Sorjaturong at the Great Western Forum in Inglewood, California, Srisomvongse played a pivotal role. After the sixth round, he asked referee Lou Filippo to allow the fight to continue, even though Sorjaturong had been suffering from the first round and Filippo had nearly stopped the contest. That extra round turned out to be decisive; Sorjaturong won by TKO in the seventh round, making boxing history.

Throughout his career, Srisomvongse was best known as the promoter behind a monthly boxing program on Channel 7, broadcast at noon on mid-month Wednesdays under the title "Suek Daorung TV Si Jed Mung Champion Lok" (Wednesday Star Boxing—World Champion Series). The program aimed to develop Thai fighters into world-class champions. It debuted on August 18, 1993, with a bout between Takrawlek Dejrath and former IBF mini-flyweight world champion Eric Chavez of the Philippines.

He died suddenly from a heart attack in his sleep on the night of December 28, 2000. At the time of his death, he was serving as Channel 7's Special Event Manager. After his death, his promotional and managerial responsibilities were transferred to Pol. Gen. Kovid Bhakdibhumi.
