= Ysaias Zamudio =

Mexican boxer (born 1969)

Ysaias Zamudio (born May 10, 1969) is a former professional boxer from Mexicali, Mexico, who resides in Blythe, California, United States. His ring nickname is "Kid Showtime".

== Professional boxing career ==
Zamudio made his professional boxing debut on August 13, 1987, defeating Jerome Wilson, 1-2 coming in, at the Great Western Forum in Inglewood, California, by a four round unanimous decision as part of the Paul Banke-Jesus Poll fight's undercard. Less than a week later, he returned to the ring in San Diego, defeating Jose Hernandez at the Cortez Hotel on August 19 by first round knockout. This fight was significant because it was Zamudio's first knockout win as a professional.

After three more wins, Zamudio faced Jose Robles in Mexicali on March 4, 1988, beating Robles by a second round knockout. This fight marked the first of six in a row held in Mexico for Zamudio, which included his first defeat as a professional, a ninth round disqualification defeat to the far more experienced, future world champion German Torres (56-10-3 coming in) on August 4 at the Plaza de Toros Calafia as part of the first Jorge Paez-Calvin Grove world title fight's undercard.

Zamudio was coached and managed by Oscar Gracia his entire career. Oscar Gracia later coached and managed Andrew Cancio during his amateur and early professional career.

== First professional title challenge ==
After his first loss, Zamudio returned to the United States, where on August 26, he outpointed 1-4 Ramon Solis over ten rounds at the Aviation Gym in Redondo Beach, California. He then clashed with future Danny Romero conqueror Willy Salazar in Ciudad Juarez, Mexico, on September 30, 1988 for Salazar's NABF Light Flyweight title. Zamudio lost to the 31-14-1 Salazar by a ninth round technical knockout.

== Second professional title challenge ==
Zamudio then outpointed Rafael Morales on November 11, 1988 at Mexicali, before fighting Jose Manuel Diaz on April 4, 1989 at the Great Western Forum, once again, in Los Angeles, California. Despite having a record of only 3 wins and 17 losses, Diaz was allowed to compete for the vacant WBA's Americas' Flyweight title. This was a rematch of Zamudio's win over Diaz only two months before, when Zamudio beat him by a ten round decision win. The second time around, Zamudio left no chances, as he stopped Diaz in only three rounds to win the WBA's crown. Zamudio and Diaz were both floored simultaneously in round three, but Zamudio got up first.

After one more fight (a ten round decision win over Jorge Ortega), Zamudio defended his regional title for the first time, meeting Martin Cardenas on June 28, 1989 at San Diego. Zamudio defeated Cardenas by a 12 round unanimous decision.

== Winning the NABF title ==
Wins over Antonio Flores and Jose Luis Herrera followed the Cardenas victory and then Zamudio boxed Javier Diaz, a 63 bout veteran, at the Harrah's Hotel and Casino in Stateline, Nevada, for the vacant NABF Flyweight title, on April 12, 1990. Zamudio won the title by unanimous twelve round decision.

Two months after winning the NABF belt, Zamudio faced Willy Salazar in a rematch; on June 15, 1990 at Mexicali, Mexico, Salazar repeated his previous victory over Zamudio, reproducing their first fight's result with a ninth round technical knockout win over Zamudio.

Zamudio returned to the win column on his next two bouts, a ten rounds decision win over Jose Angel Herrera and a 12 round decision over Tony DeLuca in defense of his NABF Flyweight title, before facing future world champion Jesus Chong of Mexico, also in defense of his NABF belt. On Monday, January 14, 1991, Zamudio beat Chong by a 12 round unanimous decision at the Great Western Forum in Inglewood, to retain the title.

A points victory over Sergio Aguila followed. Zamudio's next big fights came against former two time Jung Koo Chang world title challenger Francisco Cochulito Montiel whom held Zamudio to a ten round draw (tie) after dropping him in the last round and being penalized 3 points for punching low, on Monday, June 17, 1991 at Inglewood. A rematch was fought on July 22, 1991, one month and five days after their first bout. The second bout between Zamudio and Montiel was for Zamudio's NABF title, and Zamudio retained the belt by a twelve round unanimous decision in an undercard headlined by former world Heavyweight champion James Bonecrusher Smith.

Three ten round decision wins followed the victory over Montiel and then Zamudio defended his title again, against Jamaican Richard Clarke. On April 20, 1992, Zamudio defeated Clarke by an eight round technical decision.

== First world title challenge ==
The win over Clarke gave Zamudio a world ranking on the WBC, one of the four major boxing governing organizations, and after five further victories (one first round knockout, one second round knockout and three ten round decision wins-three of which took place at the Great Western Forum in Inglewood, one at El Paso, Texas and one at Mexicali) Zamudio was able to fight Yuri Arbachakov for the latter's WBC world Flyweight title at the World Memorial Hall in Kobe, Japan. Zamudio lost a close but unanimous twelve round decision to the 15-0, 13 knockouts coming in-champion. Zamudio lost by only two points on one card and three on another (four on the third judge's card).

== Second world title challenge ==
Zamudio next won 11 of 12 bouts, fighting mostly around the American Southwest states but also one in Tijuana, Baja California, Mexico. He lost a ten round split decision to Miguel Martinez, a boxer with a 27 wins, 7 losses and one draw (tie) record, in the Mexico fight, on June 27, 1994, being deemed loser of the bout by only one aggregate point (the two judges who scored against him both giving Martinez the win by a single point and the one who voted for him also seeing a one-point difference). On June 29, 1996, Zamudio scored a third round knockout of former WBO world champion Jose Quirino at Fantasy Springs Casino in Indio, California, which made the WBC rank him among the top challengers on the flyweight division once again.

After two more wins, Zamudio travelled to Bangkok, Thailand, where he challenged the WBC's interim world flyweight champion Chatchai Sasakul, 28-1 coming into their bout, and lost by a twelve round unanimous decision at the Prince Palace Hotel, May 9, 1997.

== Final bouts and world title challenge ==
Ysaias Zamudio then fought Alejandro Montiel for the WBC's Continental Americas' flyweight title on March 14, 1998 at Arizona Charlie's, in Las Vegas, Nevada. He lost a 12 round unanimous decision, but three months later returned with a ten round decision win over trial-horse Leonardo Gutierrez, 15-7. This enabled him to fight up-and-coming star Eric Morel on February 17, 1999 at the Van Andel Arena in Grand Rapids, Michigan. Despite dropping the American fighter of Dominican-Puerto Rican parents in round five, Zamudio was dropped twice in round seven and lost by a seventh round technical knockout.

Despite having lost that fight, Zamudio received his third world title try only five months after, on July 31, 1999, against the WBO's world flyweight champion Diego Morales. This fight took place at Plaza de Toros, Tijuana, Baja California, and Zamudio lost by a ninth round knockout, retiring soon afterwards.

He had a record of 45 wins, 9 losses and 1 draw, with 17 wins by way of knockout.

== Personal ==
Zamudio has a sister who works as a medical assistant in Phoenix, Arizona.
