= Charles Joseph Atkinson =

British International boxing trainer

- Born: St. Asaph, Wales
- Style: Orthodox

Charles Joseph Atkinson is a British former boxer, fight promoter, manager, agent and trainer/coach. He has coached and trained boxers who have won 10 professional world titles, including 7 by the WBC, and has been involved in more than 50 world title fights in five continents. None of his boxers had more than 10 professional fights before winning their titles.

Atkinson started boxing in Liverpool at the age of 14 in Liverpool Catholic schools competition, progressing to win a Northern Counties open championship at 15, and the following year reaching the National Youth finals at The Royal Albert Hall, losing in the semi-final. Following the loss, his amateur boxing club–the St Teresa's Amateur Club–closed down. Atkinson and his father, Charles Atkinson Sr. B.E.M., moved to Kirkby in 1961, where Atkinson Sr. founded the Kirkby ABC., a club which trained future world champion John Conteh and British super-lightweight champion Joey Singleton, both of whom won amateur national championships titles for the club.

Following a two-year professional career in Germany with fights in Hamburg, Cologne, and Frankfurt as well as Britain, Atkinson served four years in the Southport and Liverpool City police forces before embarking on a business career. Partnering with his brother Mike and backed by his father's fighters, he decided to go into boxing management and promotion in Liverpool in 1973. This culminated in eight years of promotions at Liverpool Stadium.

During his period in British professional boxing, Atkinson had held licenses issued by the British Boxing Board of Control as a boxer, trainer second, agent, promoter, and manager, and in 1974 had his first managerial success. Joey Singleton, trained by Atkinson Sr., won the British super-lightweight title in only his eighth professional fight, scoring a 15-round points win over Pat McCormack at Liverpool Stadium on an Atkinson Promotion.

== Achievements as a boxing promoter, match-maker, and manager ==
The highlight of the Atkinson's promotional career was the staging of John Conteh vs. Len Hutchins for the WBC light-heavyweight title in 1977, in conjunction with Manny Goodall and American promoter Bob Arum. Conteh won the bout by technical knockout.

The fight was arranged with co-operation from Conteh's agent, Bobby Naidoo, a WBC official with whom Atkinson was a close friend.

It was after this that Naidoo offered Atkinson the opportunity to train and coach fighters in Thailand, where he had connections through the WBC. Thailand had gone through a period with no world champions and was anxious to get back on the map. He cannot remember actually accepting the job, but when a return ticket to Bangkok dropped to his letterbox in 1982, he decided to leave for Thailand. Atkinson formed a close partnership with top Thai promoter Somphop Srisomwongse, and WBC official Edward Thangarajah.

Between 1983 and 1985, Atkinson's boxers won ten world titles between them, including seven by the WBC, starting with former Olympic bronze medalist Payao Poonterat, and later with Sot Chialada, Samart Payakaroon, Napa Kiatwanchai, and Saman Sorjaturong. One of his fighters, Sirimongkol Singmanasak, who won one of his two WBC titles at the age of 18.

While working with Granada and Central TV. he took a close interest in the career of Liverpool favourite, and one of his father's proteges, Shea Neary. Working closely with Neary's manager John Hyland he was instrumental in getting Neary's winning world title fight with Daryl Tyson in Liverpool televised. After the passing of his father, he trained Shea Neary for his final fight in Belfast against Noel Magee for the Commonwealth title. "In his career, he claims to have met many of the world's top boxing trainers, but maintains that Charles Atkinson Sr. B.E.M. was the best youth mentor and the best boxing trainer coach he ever worked with and attributes his own successes with youth and boxers to his methods."

A notable win in Atkinson's coaching career was the knockout victory by Saman Sorjaturong in Los Angeles over Humberto Gonzalez in 1995, a bout which was awarded Fight of the Year by The Ring magazine.

During his long period working with Thais, Atkinson also worked as a boxing advisor for ITV in Manchester, advising on fight quality and negotiating the purchase of fights from overseas. Working with Paul Doherty, Head of Sport, at Granada, and Gary Newbon who held the same role at Central TV, the programme Fight Night became very popular on the regional channels over an 8-year period and showed most of Atkinson's fight successes abroad.

In 2011 he was invited to coach amateur boxers in India. These included former world amateur champions Mary Kom and Sarita Devi. He coached them in both India and in Liverpool at Kirkby, with a view to achieving a place at the 2012 Olympics. Mary Kom made the cut, eventually winning a bronze medal after losing to eventual winner Nicola Adams.

Atkinson remains in touch with boxing at all times and has retained contact with the Kirkby Amateur Boxing club, also known as "Atkinson Lloyd Boxing Academy" in memory of Atkinson's father and Richie Lloyd.

Atkinson was the founder of the original sports brand Impact, which is now licensed by V2M Pharma and in 2021 he was made a partner in the group.

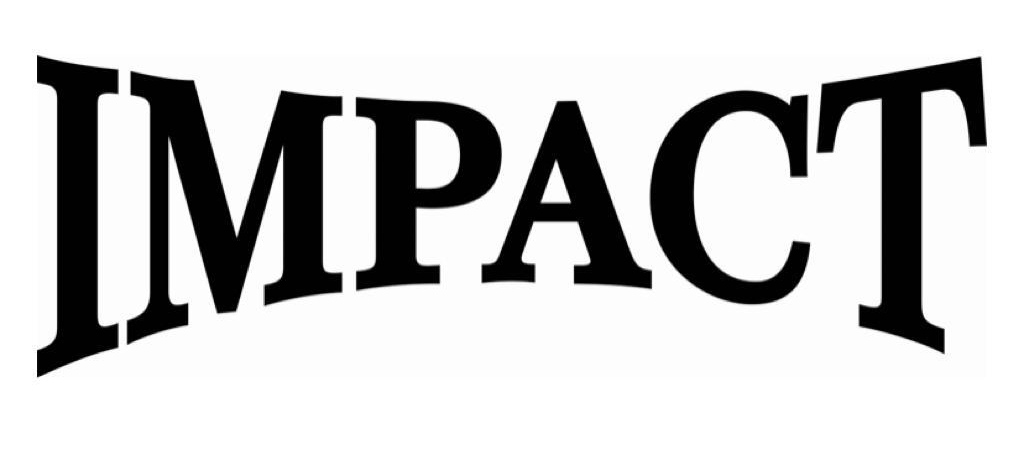
