= Charles Atkinson =

Charles or Charlie Atkinson may refer to:

- Charles Joseph Atkinson (born 1941), British boxer, fight promoter and trainer
- Charles M. Atkinson, American musicologist and writer
- Charles Atkinson-Grimshaw (1877–1933), English footballer
- Charlie Atkinson (footballer) (1932–2010), English footballer
- Charlie Atkinson (rugby union) (born 2001), English rugby union player
- Chick Atkinson (Charles L. Atkinson, 1918–1962), American football coach
