= Bangkhlanoi Sor.Thanikul =

Thai professional Muay Thai fighter (1962-2024)

- Born: Rak Saiyon; 23 September 1962; Rayong, Thailand
- Died: 18 May 2024 (aged 61)
- Native name: รักษ์ สายยนต์
- Other names: Bangkhlanoi Lukbangkhla (บางคล้าน้อย ลูกบางคล้า)
- Nickname: Diamond Heart Boy (ไอ้หนูใจเพชร)
- Height: 165 cm (5 ft 5 in)
- Division: Pinweight; Mini Flyweight; Light Flyweight; Super Flyweight; Bantamweight
- Style: Muay Thai (Muay Tae)
- Team: Sor.Thanikul Gym
- Trainer: Luesak Luekbangkhla (Kru Heng)
- Years active: c. 1970s-1988

Rak Saiyon (Thai: รักษ์ สายยนต์; 23 September 1962 – 18 May 2024), known professionally as Bangkhlanoi Sor.Thanikul (Thai: บางคล้าน้อย ส.ธนิกุล), was a Thai professional Muay Thai fighter. He was a three-division Lumpinee Stadium champion who was famous during the 1970s and 1980s.

== Biography and career ==
Rak Saiyon was born in the Rayong Province and grew up in the Bang Khla District from the Chachoengsao Province. He started Muay Thai training at the Lukklongtan camp and fought in Chachoengsao until he was big enough to fight in Bangkok where he was scouted by the Songchai promotion in 1978. From then he was training at the Sor.Thanikul camp owned by famous promotor Klaew Thanikhul.

Bangkhlanoi became a top fighter in the smaller weight classes, beating notable champion Samransak Muangsurin and the famous Payakaroon brothers Kongtoranee Payakaroon and Samart Payakaroon. He captured the 102 lbs Lumpinee Stadium title in 1979 and the 108 lbs title in 1981.

Bangkhlanoi defeated hard puncher Mafuang Weerapol on 24 August 1982 for the Lumpinee Stadium 118 lbs title. They rematched on 24 December 1982 at Rajadamnern Stadium. Bangkhlanoi won by decision and received the "Best Fighter Award" from the hands of Princess Maha Chakri Sririndhorn.

Bangkhlanoi became less dominant in the second half of the 1980s. He had a trilogy memorable for its violence against the southpaw Paiboon Fairtex in 1986. Bangkhlanoi retired in 1988. He died at the age of 61 on May 18, 2024.

== Titles and accomplishments ==
- Lumpinee Stadium
  - 1979 Lumpinee Stadium Pinweight (102 lbs) Champion
  - 1981 Lumpinee Stadium Light Flyweight (108 lbs) Champion
  - 1982 Lumpinee Stadium Bantamweight (118 lbs) Champion

Awards

- 1982 H.R.H. Princess Maha Chakri Sirindhorn Best Fighter

== Fight record ==
Muay Thai Record (Incomplete)
Date	Result	Opponent	Event	Location	Method	Round	Time
1988–	Loss	(Thailand) Cherry Sor Wanich		Bangkok, Thailand	Decision	5	3:00
1987–11-08	Win	(Thailand) Lukkiat Muangsurin	Samart Payakaroon vs Hogan Noguchi	Chachoengsao, Thailand	Decision	5	3:00
1987-05-19	Loss	(Thailand) Daothongnoi Sitdaothong	Lumpinee Stadium	Bangkok, Thailand	Decision	5	3:00
1987-02-06	Loss	(Thailand) Panrit Luksrirat	Lumpinee Stadium	Bangkok, Thailand	Decision	5	3:00
1987-01-13	Draw	(Thailand) Panrit Luksrirat	OneSongchai, Lumpinee Stadium	Bangkok, Thailand	Decision	5	3:00
1986-12-10	Win	(Thailand) Paiboon Fairtex	Huamark Stadium	Bangkok, Thailand	KO (Elbow)	3	
1986-10-24	Win	(Thailand) Paiboon Fairtex	OneSongchai, Lumpinee Stadium	Bangkok, Thailand	Decision	5	3:00
1986-09-29	Loss	(Thailand) Paiboon Fairtex	Rajadamnern Stadium	Bangkok, Thailand	Decision	5	3:00
1985-10-11	Loss	(Thailand) Wisanupon Saksamut	Lumpinee Stadium	Bangkok, Thailand	Decision	5	3:00
1985-09-03	Loss	(Thailand) Sanit Wichitkriengkrai	Lumpinee Stadium	Bangkok, Thailand	Decision	5	3:00
1985-04-30	NC	(Thailand) Chanchai Sor Tamarangsri	Lumpinee Stadium	Bangkok, Thailand	Bangkhlanoi dismissed	5	
1985-03-06	Win	(Thailand) Phayanoi Sor.Thasanee	WBA - Khaosai Galaxy vs Dong-Hoon Lee, Rajadamnern Stadium	Bangkok, Thailand	Decision	5	3:00
1985-01-08	Loss	(Thailand) Manasak Sor Ploenchit	OneSongchai, Lumpinee Stadium	Bangkok, Thailand	Decision	5	3:00
1984-11-09	Win	(Thailand) Palannoi Kiatanan	OneSongchai, Lumpinee Stadium	Bangkok, Thailand	Decision	5	3:00
1984-10-19	Loss	(Thailand) Maewnoi Sitchang	OneSongchai, Lumpinee Stadium	Bangkok, Thailand	Decision	5	3:00
1984-09-06	Loss	(Thailand) Saencherng Pinsinchai	Rajadamnern Stadium	Bangkok, Thailand	Decision	5	3:00
1984-06-12	Loss	(Thailand) Kanongsuk Sitomnoi	Lumpinee Stadium	Bangkok, Thailand	Decision	5	3:00
1984–	Win	(Thailand) Lukyad Muangsurin		Bangkok, Thailand	Decision	5	3:00
1984-03-09	Win	(Thailand) Lankrung Kiatkriangkrai	Onesongchai, Lumpinee Stadium	Bangkok, Thailand	Decision	5	3:00
1983-12-28	Loss	(Thailand) Kongtoranee Payakaroon	Rajadamnern Stadium	Bangkok, Thailand	Decision	5	3:00
1983-11-11	Win	(Thailand) Lankrung Kiatkriangkrai	OneSongchai, Lumpinee Stadium	Bangkok, Thailand	Decision	5	3:00
1983-10-13	Loss	(Thailand) Kongtoranee Payakaroon	Rajadamnern Stadium	Bangkok, Thailand	Decision	5	3:00
1983-08-26	Win	(Thailand) Palannoi Kiatanan	OneSongchai, Lumpinee Stadium	Bangkok, Thailand	Decision	5	3:00
1983-04-05	Loss	(Thailand) Sornsilp Sitnoenpayom	Lumpinee Stadium	Bangkok, Thailand	Decision	5	3:00
Loses the Lumpinee Stadium Bantamweight (118 lbs) title.
1983-02-04	Loss	(Thailand) Samransak Muangsurin	Lumpinee Stadium	Bangkok, Thailand	TKO	3	
1982-12-24	Win	(Thailand) Mafuang Weerapol	OneSongchai + Thanikul, Rajadamnern Stadium	Bangkok, Thailand	Decision	5	3:00
Receives the Princess "Best Fighter Award".
1982-09-20	Loss	(Thailand) Samransak Muangsurin	Lumpinee Stadium	Bangkok, Thailand	KO	2	
1982-08-24	Win	(Thailand) Mafuang Weerapol	Lumpinee Stadium	Bangkok, Thailand	Decision	5	3:00
Wins the Lumpinee Stadium Bantamweight (118 lbs) title.
1982-06-22	Loss	(Thailand) Mafuang Weerapol	Onesongchai, Lumpinee Stadium	Bangkok, Thailand	Decision	5	3:00
1982-05-27	Win	(Thailand) Samransak Muangsurin	Rajadamnern Stadium	Bangkok, Thailand	Decision	5	3:00
1982-04-	Win	(Thailand) Fonluang Luksadetmaephuangthong	Rajadamnern Stadium	Bangkok, Thailand	Decision	5	3:00
1982-03-12	Draw	(Thailand) Fonluang Luksadetmaephuangthong	OneSongchai, Lumpinee Stadium	Bangkok, Thailand	Decision	5	3:00
For the Lumpinee Stadium Super Flyweight (115 lbs) title.
1982-02-	Win	(Thailand) Fahkhamram Lukprabat	Rajadamnern Stadium	Bangkok, Thailand	Decision	5	3:00
1982-01-15	Win	(Thailand) Kongtoranee Payakaroon	Lumpinee Stadium	Bangkok, Thailand	Decision	5	3:00
1981-11-06	Win	(Thailand) Phayanoi Sor.Thasanee		Nakhon Ratchasima, Thailand	Decision	5	3:00
1981-10-13	Win	(Thailand) Chakrawan Kiatsaktewan	Lumpinee Stadium	Bangkok, Thailand	Decision	5	3:00
1981-03-31	Win	(Thailand) Makhamphet Rojasongkhram	Lumpinee Stadium	Bangkok, Thailand	Decision	5	3:00
Wins the Lumpinee Stadium Light Flyweight (108 lbs) title.
1980-12-18	Win	(Thailand) Sangasak Na Nontachai	Rajadamnern Stadium	Bangkok, Thailand	Decision	5	3:00
1980-09-23	Loss	(Thailand) Samart Payakaroon	Lumpinee Stadium	Bangkok, Thailand	Decision	5	3:00
1980-06-27	Win	(Thailand) Samart Payakaroon	Lumpinee Stadium	Bangkok, Thailand	Decision	5	3:00
1980-06-06	Loss	(Thailand) Kongtoranee Payakaroon	Lumpinee Stadium	Bangkok, Thailand	Decision	5	3:00
For the Lumpinee Stadium Light Flyweight (108 lbs) title.
1980-01-22	Win	(Thailand) Semer Ketsongkram	Lumpinee Stadium	Bangkok, Thailand	Decision	5	3:00
1979-10-02	Draw	(Thailand) Kongtoranee Payakaroon	OneSongchai, Lumpinee Stadium	Bangkok, Thailand	Decision	5	3:00
For the vacant Lumpinee Stadium Mini Flyweight (105 lbs) title.
1979-	Loss	(Thailand) Hanuman Sitporluang	Lumpinee Stadium	Bangkok, Thailand	Decision	5	3:00
1979-06-26	Win	(Thailand) Kongtoranee Payakaroon	Lumpinee Stadium	Bangkok, Thailand	Decision	5	3:00
Wins the Lumpinee Stadium Pinweight (102 lbs) title.
1979-04-20	Win	(Thailand) Yodphon Pongsing	OneSongchai, Lumpinee Stadium	Bangkok, Thailand	Decision	5	3:00
1979-02-27	Win	(Thailand) Ekasit Kor.Kerdphol	Onesongchai, Lumpinee Stadium	Bangkok, Thailand	Referee Stoppage	4	
1979-01-	Loss	(Thailand) Hanuman Sitporluang	Lumpinee Stadium	Bangkok, Thailand	Decision	5	3:00
1978-10-27	Loss	(Thailand) Kongtoranee Payakaroon	OneSongchai, Lumpinee Stadium	Bangkok, Thailand	Decision	5	3:00
1978-02-10	Draw	(Thailand) Jom Kalteksawang	Onesongchai, Lumpinee Stadium	Bangkok, Thailand	Decision	5	3:00
1978-01-17	Win	(Thailand) Denchai Pornphisanu	Onesongchai, Lumpinee Stadium	Bangkok, Thailand	Decision	5	3:00
Legend: Win Loss Draw/No contest Notes
