= Kongtoranee Payakaroon =

Thai Muay Thai fighter and professional boxer

- Born: Chartchai Tiptamai (ชาติชาย ทิพย์ท่าไม้); July 12, 1960 (age 66); Tambon Khlong Khet, Bang Pakong, Chachoengsao, Thailand
- Native name: สุบิน เดชทิพย์ท่าไม้
- Nickname: Chart (ชาติ)
- Height: 170 cm (5 ft 7 in)
- Division: Pinweight; Light Flyweight; Flyweight; Super Flyweight; Bantamweight
- Style: Muay Thai (Muay Femur / Muay Mat); Boxing
- Stance: Orthodox
- Team: Sityodtong Gym
- Trainer: Yodtong Senanan (Muay Thai); Sukjai Sappalek (Professional Boxing)
- Years active: c. 1971–1990

Professional boxing record
- Total: 14
- Wins: 12
- By knockout: 9
- Losses: 2

Kickboxing record
- Total: 274
- Wins: 200
- Losses: 74

Other information
- Occupation: Muay Thai fighter (retired); Muay Thai trainer
- Notable relatives: Samart Payakaroon (younger brother)
- Boxing record from BoxRec

Subin Dejtiptamai (Thai: สุบิน เดชทิพย์ท่าไม้; born Chartchai Tiptamai Thai: ชาติชาย ทิพย์ท่าไม้; July 12, 1960), known professionally as Kongtoranee Payakaroon (Thai: ก้องธรณี พยัคฆ์อรุณ), is a retired Thai Muay Thai fighter and professional boxer. He is a former five-division Lumpinee Stadium champion, the 1984 Sports Writers Association of Thailand Fighter of the Year, and also challenged for a WBC and a WBA Super Flyweight title in boxing. He is the older brother of Samart Payakaroon, another famous Muay Thai and boxing champion.

== Muay Thai career ==
Payakaroon (personal nickname: Chart; ชาติ) started his career from Muay Thai at the age of 11 before the brother, Samart. The brothers have the same trainer was Yodtong "Kru Tui" Senanan. Later, he became famous in the Amphoe Bang Lamung, eastern Thailand. In 1977, when he was 17 he came to Bangkok for as fighter under the famous promoter, Songchai Rattanasuban along with Samart, and since then, he has become a famous and favorite Muay Thai fighter. Before that, he had experienced about 100 fights. He fought with many famous fighters, such as Bangkhlanoi Sor.Thanikul, Samransak Muangsurin, Chamuakpetch Hapalang, Wangchannoi Sor Palangchai or Petdam Lookborai. His maximum remuneration was 120,000 baht in fight against Samingnoom Sithiboonthum at Rajadamnern Stadium. He won five different weight championships of the Lumpinee Stadium during 1978–84.

== Professional boxing career ==
Payakaroon made his professional debut on April 2, 1985. Among his early victories was a notable win over fellow Thai boxer Payao Poontarat, a former WBC Super Flyweight champion. However, that win occurred sometime after his debut and was not his first fight.

He went on to record a total of nine consecutive wins before challenging Gilberto Román, the reigning WBC Super Flyweight champion, on December 19, 1986, at Indoor Stadium Huamark. The bout was organized by Gen Sunthorn Kongsompong. Payakaroon lost the fight by unanimous decision and suffered significant facial injuries.

He continued fighting three more times and eventually rose to become the #1 contender in the WBA Junior Bantamweight rankings. On January 26, 1988, he faced fellow Thai fighter Khaosai Galaxy, the WBA titleholder, at Lumpinee Stadium. The two knew each other well, as Payakaroon had once served as Galaxy's sparring partner. Galaxy had previously trained at Yodtong Senanan's gym in Nong Prue, Chonburi, in preparation for his 1984 title fight against Dominican boxer Eusebio Espinal.

In their bout, Payakaroon wore blue trunks with gold stripes and golden boots. He employed hit-and-run tactics throughout the 12 rounds and even managed to knock Galaxy down in the fifth round. After the fight, he expressed strong confidence in his victory, as did his fans and manager. However, when the official decision was announced, he lost. His manager, Songchai Rattanasuban, reacted angrily, claiming the fight had been rigged.

Later, Rattanasuban received an offer for Payakaroon to challenge Ellyas Pical, the IBF Junior Bantamweight champion from Indonesia, who had previously lost to Galaxy by knockout in the 14th round in 1987. The fight was to take place in Pical's hometown, but Payakaroon declined the offer, believing the pay would be unfairly low.

== Retirement ==
After failing to win the world championship in two attempts, Payakaroon was invited by a friend, who was a war correspondent, to join him in covering conflicts in France, Lebanon, and along the Thai border in what is now Sa Kaeo province. Although he was offered the opportunity to assist, he ultimately did not take the role due to a lack of skills and fluency in English. Unexpectedly, he returned to Muay Thai and continued fighting until his retirement in 1990. After retiring, he spent two years in Japan working as a Muay Thai trainer.

Later, he served as an assistant trainer at Sityodtong Gym in Bangkok, under the direction of Yodtong Senanan; he also had the opportunity to train students in Baku, Azerbaijan.

In 2007, he took over the management of a Muay Thai gym from his brother, Samart Payakaroon, after Samart's divorce.

== Titles and accomplishments ==
=== Muay Thai ===
- Lumpinee Stadium
  - 1978 Lumpinee Stadium Pinweight (102 lbs) Champion
    - One successful title defense
  - 1980 Lumpinee Stadium Light Flyweight (108 lbs) Champion
    - Two successful title defenses
  - 1980 Lumpinee Stadium Flyweight (112 lbs) Champion
    - Two successful title defenses
  - 1983 Lumpinee Stadium Super Flyweight (115 lbs) Champion
    - One successful title defense
  - 1984 Lumpinee Stadium Bantamweight (118 lbs) Champion
    - One successful title defense
- World Muay Thai Council
  - 1990 WMTC World Light Welterweight (140 lbs) Champion

Awards

- 1978 King's Fighter of the Year
- 1984 Sports Writers Association of Thailand Fighter of the Year

== Boxing record ==
=== Professional boxing record ===
14 fights	12 wins	2 losses
By knockout	9	0
By decision	3	2

No.	Result	Record	Opponent	Type	Round	Date	Location	Notes
14	Loss	12–2	(Thailand) Khaosai Galaxy	UD	12	26 January 1988	Lumpinee Stadium, Bangkok, Thailand	For the WBA World Super Flyweight title.
13	Win	12–1	(Thailand) Prabtoranee Luklampakchee	KO	4	27 October 1987	Bangkok, Thailand	
12	Win	11–1	(South Korea) Kwang Soo Lee	KO	6	1 August 1987	Omnoi Stadium, Bangkok, Thailand	
11	Win	10–1	(South Korea) Sang Suk Bang	PTS	10	31 March 1987	Bangkok, Thailand	
10	Loss	9–1	(Mexico) Gilberto Roman	UD	12	19 December 1986	Huamark Stadium, Bangkok, Thailand	For the WBC World Super Flyweight title.
9	Win	9–0	(South Korea) Yun Ho Park	KO	9 (10)	9 September 1986	Bangkok, Thailand	
8	Win	8–0	(Thailand) Nakarat Kiatsonthaya	KO	3	13 June 1986	Bangkok, Thailand	
7	Win	7–0	(South Korea) Kwang Nak Song	KO	4	13 March 1986	Rangsit, Thailand	
6	Win	6–0	(Philippines) William Develos	KO	2 (10)	23 January 1986	Rangsit, Thailand	
5	Win	5–0	(Philippines) Joseph Ladepi	KO	6	29 November 1985	Bangkok, Thailand	
4	Win	4–0	(Japan) Kentoku Nakama	KO	3	11 October 1985	Bangkok, Thailand	
3	Win	3–0	(Thailand) Vibul Kiatsoros	KO	2	16 June 1985	Bangkok, Thailand	
2	Win	2–0	(Thailand) Payao Poontarat	PTS	10	2 April 1985	Bangkok, Thailand	
1	Win	1–0	(Philippines) Ruben De La Cruz	PTS	10	8 February 1985	Bangkok, Thailand	

== Muay Thai record ==
Muay Thai Record (Incomplete)
165 Wins, 45 Losses
Date	Result	Opponent	Event	Location	Method	Round	Time
1993-04-24	Win	(Japan) Hiroshi Oshiba	MAJKF	Tokyo, Japan	KO (Left Hook)	1	
1990-12-02	Win	(France) Dida Diafat		Manchester, England	Decision	5	3:00
Wins Muay Thai World Light Welterweight (140 lbs) title.
1990-11-01	Win	(Thailand) Samransak Muangsurin	Lumpinee Stadium	Bangkok, Thailand	Decision	5	3:00
1990-10-12	Draw	(Thailand) Samransak Muangsurin	Lumpinee Stadium	Bangkok, Thailand	Decision	5	3:00
1990-09-01	Win	(Thailand) Sakmongkol Sithchuchok	Lumpinee Stadium	Bangkok, Thailand	KO (Right Hook)	3	
1990-	Win	(Netherlands) John Fortes		Netherlands	TKO (Punches)	1	
1990-06-23	Loss	(Thailand) Samranthong Kiatbanchong	Lumpinee Stadium	Bangkok, Thailand	Decision	5	3:00
1990-05-27	Win	(Netherlands) Gilbert Ballantine		Paris, France	Decision	5	3:00
1990-05-15	Win	(Thailand) Samingnoi Kiatkamchai	Lumpinee Stadium	Bangkok, Thailand	Decision	5	3:00
1990-04-24	Loss	(Thailand) Kaonar Sor.Kettalingchan	Lumpinee Stadium	Bangkok, Thailand	Decision	5	3:00
1990-03-19	Win	(Thailand) Ritthichai Lookchaomaesaitong		Bangkok, Thailand	Decision	5	3:00
1989-03-28	Loss	(Thailand) Pon Narupai	Lumpinee Stadium	Bangkok, Thailand	KO	3	
1989-02-24	Win	(Thailand) Grandprixnoi Muangchaiyaphum	Lumpinee Stadium	Bangkok, Thailand	KO (High Kick)	3	
1989-01-31	Loss	(Thailand) Wangchannoi Sor Palangchai	Lumpinee Stadium	Bangkok, Thailand	Decision	5	3:00
1988-12-02	Loss	(Thailand) Petchdam Lukborai	Lumpinee Stadium	Bangkok, Thailand	Decision	5	3:00
1988-09-27	Win	(Thailand) Dokmaipa Por Pongsawang	Lumpinee Stadium	Bangkok, Thailand	Decision	5	3:00
1988-08-05	Loss	(Thailand) Namphon Nongkee Pahuyuth	Lumpinee Stadium	Bangkok, Thailand	Decision	5	3:00
1988-06-24	Loss	(Thailand) Panomtuanlek Hapalang	Lumpinee Stadium	Bangkok, Thailand	Decision	5	3:00
1984-12-07	Win	(Thailand) Maewnoi Sitchang	Lumpinee Stadium	Bangkok, Thailand	Decision	5	3:00
1984-11-09	Win	(Thailand) Petchdam Lukborai	Lumpinee Stadium	Bangkok, Thailand	Decision	5	3:00
1984-09-21	Win	(Netherlands) Milo El Geubli		France	Decision	5	3:00
1984-09-14	Loss	(Thailand) Petchdam Lukborai	Lumpinee Stadium	Bangkok, Thailand	Decision	5	3:00
Loses the Lumpinee Stadium Bantamweight (118 lbs) title.
1984-07-31	Win	(Thailand) Samransak Muangsurin	Lumpinee Stadium	Bangkok, Thailand	Decision	5	3:00
1984-04-10	Loss	(Thailand) Manasak Sor Ploenchit	Lumpinee Stadium	Bangkok, Thailand	Decision	5	3:00
1984-03-09	Win	(Thailand) Petchdam Lukborai	Lumpinee Stadium	Bangkok, Thailand	KO (Punches)	3	
Defends the Lumpinee Stadium Bantamweight (118 lbs) title.
1984-01-31	Win	(Thailand) Chamuekpet Hapalang	Lumpinee Stadium	Bangkok, Thailand	Decision	5	3:00
Wins the Lumpinee Stadium Bantamweight (118 lbs) title.
1983-12-28	Win	(Thailand) Bangkhlanoi Sor.Thanikul	Rajadamnern Stadium	Bangkok, Thailand	Decision	5	3:00
1983-11-15	Win	(Thailand) Samransak Muangsurin	Lumpinee Stadium	Bangkok, Thailand	Decision	5	3:00
1983-10-13	Win	(Thailand) Bangkhlanoi Sor.Thanikul	Rajadamnern Stadium	Bangkok, Thailand	Decision	5	3:00
1983-09-13	Win	(Thailand) Phadam Lukbangbor	Lumpinee Stadium	Bangkok, Thailand	Decision	5	3:00
1983-08-26	Win	(Thailand) Rung Sakprasong	Lumpinee Stadium	Bangkok, Thailand	Decision	5	3:00
Defends the Lumpinee Stadium Super Flyweight (115 lbs) title.
1983-07-12	Win	(Thailand) Phadam Lukbangbor	Lumpinee Stadium	Bangkok, Thailand	Decision	5	3:00
1983-05-10	Win	(Thailand) Palanoi Kiatanan	Lumpinee Stadium	Bangkok, Thailand	KO	4	
1983-04-05	Win	(Thailand) Pornsaknoi Sitchang	Lumpinee Stadium	Bangkok, Thailand	Decision	5	3:00
Wins the vacant Lumpinee Stadium Super Flyweight (115 lbs) title.
1983-03-04	Win	(Thailand) Lankrung Kiatkriankgrai	Lumpinee Stadium	Bangkok, Thailand	Decision	5	3:00
1983-01-28	Win	(Thailand) Pornsaknoi Sitchang	Lumpinee Stadium	Bangkok, Thailand	Decision	5	3:00
1982-11-22	Loss	(Thailand) Boonam Sor.Jarunee	Rajadamnern Stadium	Bangkok, Thailand	Decision	5	3:00
1982-10-15	Loss	(Thailand) Rung Sakprasong	Lumpinee Stadium	Bangkok, Thailand	Decision	5	3:00
1982-08-24	Win	(Thailand) Wisanupon Saksamut	Lumpinee Stadium	Bangkok, Thailand	Decision	5	3:00
1982-06-22	Loss	(Thailand) Chamuekpet Hapalang	Lumpinee Stadium	Bangkok, Thailand	Decision	5	3:00
Loses the Lumpinee Stadium Flyweight (112 lbs) title.
1982-05-10	Win	(Thailand) Phadam Lukbangbor	Lumpinee Stadium	Bangkok, Thailand	Referee Stoppage	5	
1982-03-12	Win	(Thailand) Chamuekpet Hapalang	Lumpinee Stadium	Bangkok, Thailand	Decision	5	3:00
Defends the Lumpinee Stadium Flyweight (112 lbs) title.
1982-01-15	Loss	(Thailand) Bangkhlanoi Sor.Thanikul	Lumpinee Stadium	Bangkok, Thailand	Decision	5	3:00
1981-12-08	Draw	(Thailand) Phanmongkol Hor.Mahachai	Lumpinee Stadium	Bangkok, Thailand	Decision	5	3:00
1981-11-09	Win	(Thailand) Fahkamram Sitponthep	Rajadamnern Stadium	Bangkok, Thailand	Decision	5	3:00
1981-10-13	Draw	(Thailand) Samransak Muangsurin	Rajadamnern Stadium	Bangkok, Thailand	Decision	5	3:00
1981-09-21	Loss	(Thailand) Samransak Muangsurin	Rajadamnern Stadium	Bangkok, Thailand	Decision	5	3:00
1981-09-04	Win	(Thailand) Fahkamram Sitponthep	Lumpinee Stadium	Bangkok, Thailand	Decision	5	3:00
Defends the Lumpinee Stadium Flyweight (112 lbs) title.
1981-07-14	Loss	(Thailand) Mafuang Weerapol	Lumpinee Stadium	Bangkok, Thailand	Decision	5	3:00
1981-06-09	Win	(Thailand) Jakrawal Kiatisaktewai	Rajadamnern Stadium	Bangkok, Thailand	Decision	5	3:00
1981-05-13	Win	(Thailand) Samingnoom Sithiboontham	Rajadamnern Stadium	Bangkok, Thailand	Decision	5	3:00
1981-04-20	Win	(Thailand) Somsaknoi Kiatyothin	Lumpinee Stadium	Bangkok, Thailand	Decision	5	3:00
1981-03-31	Win	(Thailand) Man Sor.Jitpattana	Lumpinee Stadium	Bangkok, Thailand	KO	5	
1981-01-23	Win	(Thailand) Piyarat Sor.Narongmit	Lumpinee Stadium	Bangkok, Thailand	Referee Stoppage	5	
1980-12-02	Loss	(Thailand) Mafuang Weerapol	Onesongchai, Lumpinee Stadium	Bangkok, Thailand	Decision (Unanimous)	5	3:00
For the Lumpinee Stadium Bantamweight (118 lbs) title.
1980-11-07	Win	(Thailand) Phanomongkol Hor.Mahachai	Lumpinee Stadium	Bangkok, Thailand	Decision	5	3:00
1980-09-23	Win	(Thailand) Singtong Prasopchai	Lumpinee Stadium	Bangkok, Thailand	Decision	5	3:00
Wins the Lumpinee Stadium Flyweight (112 lbs) title.
1980-08-29	Win	(Thailand) Denpayak Sakwitthaya	Lumpinee Stadium	Bangkok, Thailand	Decision	5	3:00
1980-07-29	Win	(Thailand) Fonluang Looksadetmaepuangtong	Lumpinee Stadium	Bangkok, Thailand	Decision	5	3:00
Defends the Lumpinee Stadium Light Flyweight (108 lbs) title.
1980-06-06	Win	(Thailand) Bangkhlanoi Sor.Thanikul	Lumpinee Stadium	Bangkok, Thailand	Decision	5	3:00
Defends the Lumpinee Stadium Light Flyweight (108 lbs) title.
1980-03-31	Loss	(Thailand) Samoenai Kiatsongkram	Rajadamnern Stadium	Bangkok, Thailand	Decision	5	3:00
1980-02-22	Win	(Thailand) Khiopit Chuwattana	Lumpinee Stadium	Bangkok, Thailand	Decision	5	3:00
Wins the vacant Lumpinee Stadium Light Flyweight (108 lbs) title.
1980-01-29	Loss	(Thailand) Hanuman Sitporluang	Lumpinee Stadium	Bangkok, Thailand	Decision	5	3:00
1979-11-02	Loss	(Thailand) Khunponoi Sitprasang	Lumpinee Stadium	Bangkok, Thailand	Decision	5	3:00
For the vacant Lumpinee Stadium Light Flyweight (108 lbs) title.
1979-10-10	Win	(Thailand) Yodphol Pongsing	Lumpinee Stadium	Bangkok, Thailand	Decision	5	3:00
1979-10-02	Draw	(Thailand) Bangkhlanoi Sor.Thanikul	Lumpinee Stadium	Bangkok, Thailand	Decision	5	3:00
For the vacant Lumpinee Stadium Mini Flyweight (105 lbs) title.
1979-09-04		(Thailand) Hanuman Sitporluang	Lumpinee Stadium	Bangkok, Thailand			
1979-08-17	Win	(Thailand) Kingchai Phisanchai	Lumpinee Stadium	Bangkok, Thailand	Decision	5	3:00
1979-06-26	Loss	(Thailand) Bangkhlanoi Sor.Thanikul	Lumpinee Stadium	Bangkok, Thailand	Decision	5	3:00
Loses the Lumpinee Stadium Mini Flyweight (102 lbs) title.
1979-04-20	WIn	(Thailand) Somsaknoi Kiatyothin	Lumpinee Stadium	Bangkok, Thailand	Decision	5	3:00
1979-03-23	Win	(Thailand) Kingchai Phisanchai	Lumpinee Stadium	Bangkok, Thailand	Decision	5	3:00
Defends the Lumpinee Stadium Mini Flyweight (102 lbs) title.
1979-02-27	Loss	(Thailand) Hanuman Sitporluang	Onesongchai, Lumpinee Stadium	Bangkok, Thailand	Decision	5	3:00
1979-01-09	Loss	(Thailand) Kingchai Lookbangbo	Lumpinee Stadium	Bangkok, Thailand	Decision	5	3:00
1978-12-15	Win	(Thailand) Hanuman Sitporluang	Lumpinee Stadium	Bangkok, Thailand	Decision	5	3:00
Wins the Lumpinee Stadium Mini Flyweight (102 lbs) title.
1978-10-27	Win	(Thailand) Bangkhlanoi Sor.Thanikul	Lumpinee Stadium	Bangkok, Thailand	Decision	5	3:00
1978-10-10	Win	(Thailand) Yodphol Pongsing	Lumpinee Stadium	Bangkok, Thailand	Decision	5	3:00
1978-09-22	Win	(Thailand) Jockylek Singsayan	Lumpinee Stadium	Bangkok, Thailand	Decision	5	3:00
1978-06-13	Win	(Thailand) Jockynoi Singsayan	Lumpinee Stadium	Bangkok, Thailand	Decision	5	3:00
1978-05-23	Win	(Thailand) Rungsakorn Asiabaeber	Lumpinee Stadium	Bangkok, Thailand	Decision	5	3:00
Legend: Win Loss Draw/No contest Notes

== See also ==
- List of boxing families
