= Mafuang Weerapol =

Thai former professional Muay Thai fighter

- Born: Nopnoi Cherdsuk; June 2, 1955 (age 71); Surin Province, Thailand
- Native name: นพน้อย เชิดสุข
- Other names: Mafuang Kiat Chor.Por (มะเฟือง เกียรติ ช.ป.)
- Nickname: Hands of Stone (ไอ้หมัดหิน)
- Height: 167 cm (5 ft 6 in)
- Division: Bantamweight
- Style: Muay Thai (Muay Mat)
- Stance: Southpaw
- Team: Lukmatulee Gym

Nopnoi Cherdsuk (Thai: นพน้อย เชิดสุข; born June 2, 1955), known professionally as Mafuang Weerapol (Thai: มะเฟือง วีรพล), is a Thai former professional Muay Thai fighter. He is a former Lumpinee Stadium and Rajadamnern Stadium champion at Bantamweight who was famous during the 1980s.

== Muay Thai career ==
Mafuang started fighting in the Surin and Buriram provinces as child, he made his Lumpinee Stadium debut in 1973, winning by knockout. He had bad results in his following bouts and ended up going back to the provinces to compete. He made his return to Bangkok this time fighting out of the Lukmatulee camp.

Between 1978 and 1982 Mafung was one of the most dominant bantamweight on the Bangkok stadium circuit. He was feared for his punching power which led him to hold the belts from both the Rajadamnern and Lumpinee Stadiums. His dominance saw him defend his belts multiple times and take on handicap fights.

Mafuang faced Muay Thai legend Samart Payakaroon on June 9, 1981 at the Lumpinee Stadium. He lost the fight by decision but their furious encounter was awarded fight of the Year by Muay Thai authorities. Samart later described Mafuang as the opponent he was the most afraid of in the ring.

On August 24, 1982 Mafuang lost his Lumpinee Stadium title against Bangkhlanoi Sor.Thanikul They rematched on one of the most important card in Muay Thai history headlined by the Samart Payakaroon vs Dieselnoi Chor Thanasukarn matchup at Rajadamnern Stadium on December 24, 1982. He was defeated by decision.

== Titles and accomplishments ==
- Lumpinee Stadium
  - 1980 Lumpinee Stadium Bantamweight (118 lbs) Champion
    - Three successful title defenses
- Rajadamnern Stadium
  - 1980 Rajadamnern Stadium Bantamweight (118 lbs) Champion
    - One successful title defense

Awards

- 1981 Sports Writers Association of Thailand Fight of the Year (vs Samart Payakaroon)

== Muay Thai record ==
Muay Thai Record
Date	Result	Opponent	Event	Location	Method	Round	Time
1987-09-17	Loss	(Thailand) Chalao Muangsurin	Lumpinee Stadium	Buriram province, Thailand	KO	1	
1986-11-03	Loss	(Thailand) Sukkasem Lukarthit	Samrong Stadium	Samut Prakan, Thailand	TKO (Knees)	3	
1986-06-30	Loss	(Thailand) Sukkasem Lukarthit	Samrong Stadium	Samut Prakan, Thailand	Decision	5	3:00
1986-06-03	Win	(Thailand) Laemphet Lukbanbo		Roi Et province, Thailand	KO	1	
1985-	Win	(Thailand) Petpayao Kiatadee	Samrong Stadium	Samut Prakan, Thailand	KO (Punches)	1	
1984-07-31	Loss	(Thailand) Kongdej Sitchow	Lumpinee Stadium	Bangkok, Thailand	Decision	5	3:00
1983-12-02	Win	(Thailand) Densiam Sor.Prateep		Ubon Ratchathani province, Thailand	Decision	5	3:00
1983-08-26	NC	(Thailand) Samransak Muangsurin	Lumpinee Stadium	Bangkok, Thailand	Ref.stop. (lack of comabtivity)	5	
1983-07-12	Win	(Thailand) Rung Sakprasong	Lumpinee Stadium	Bangkok, Thailand	KO	2	
1983-05-10	Loss	(Thailand) Sornsilp Sitnoenpayom	Lumpinee Stadium	Bangkok, Thailand	Decision	5	3:00
1983-03-25	Win	(Thailand) Phadam Lukbangbo	Lumpinee Stadium	Bangkok, Thailand	KO	2	
1983-03-05	Loss	(Thailand) Chamuekpet Hapalang		Chiang Mai, Thailand	Decision	5	3:00
1982-12-24	Loss	(Thailand) Bangkhlanoi Sor.Thanikul	OneSongchai + Thanikul, Rajadamnern Stadium	Bangkok, Thailand	Decision	5	3:00
1982-12-03	Win	(Thailand) Rung Sakprasong	Lumpinee Stadium	Bangkok, Thailand	KO	1	
1982-08-24	Loss	(Thailand) Bangkhlanoi Sor.Thanikul	Lumpinee Stadium	Bangkok, Thailand	Decision	5	3:00
Loses the Lumpinee Stadium Bantamweight (118 lbs) title.
1982-06-22	Win	(Thailand) Bangkhlanoi Sor.Thanikul	Lumpinee Stadium	Bangkok, Thailand	Decision	5	3:00
1982-03-12	Win	(Thailand) Jakrawan Kiattisaktewan	Lumpinee Stadium	Bangkok, Thailand	KO (Punches)	1	
Defends the Lumpinee Stadium Bantamweight (118 lbs) title.
1982-02-26	Loss	(Thailand) Samransak Muangsurin	Lumpinee Stadium	Bangkok, Thailand	Decision	5	3:00
1982-01-15	Win	(Thailand) Samingnoom Sithiboontham	Lumpinee Stadium	Bangkok, Thailand	KO (Punches)	3	
1981-09-04	Win	(Thailand) Fonluang Luksadetmaephuangtong	Lumpinee Stadium	Bangkok, Thailand	KO	1	
Defends the Lumpinee Stadium Bantamweight (118 lbs) title.
1981-07-14	Win	(Thailand) Kongtoranee Payakaroon	Lumpinee Stadium	Bangkok, Thailand	Decision	5	3:00
1981-06-09	Loss	(Thailand) Samart Payakaroon	Lumpinee Stadium	Bangkok, Thailand	Decision	5	3:00
1981-04-08	Loss	(Thailand) Jomwo Sakniran	Rajadamnern Stadium	Bangkok, Thailand	KO	1	
Loses the Rajadamnern Stadium Bantamweight (118 lbs) title.
1981-01-23	Win	(Thailand) Manun Sor.Jitpattana		Bangkok, Thailand	Decision	5	3:00
1980-12-02	Win	(Thailand) Kongtoranee Payakaroon	Lumpinee Stadium	Bangkok, Thailand	Decision	5	3:00
Defends the Lumpinee Stadium Bantamweight (118 lbs) title.
1980-07-29	Loss	(Thailand) Paruhat Loh-ngoen (Thailand) Thanusuk Prasopchai	2 vs 1 Lumpinee Stadium	Bangkok, Thailand	Decision	5	3:00
Handicap match. Paruhat fought the first three rounds and Thanusuk the next two.
1980-06-05	Win	(Thailand) Jomwo Sakniran	Rajadamnern Stadium	Bangkok, Thailand	Decision	5	3:00
Defends the Rajadamnern Stadium Bantamweight (118 lbs) title.
1980-03-05	Win	(Thailand) Wanlop Pichitsamut	Rajadamnern Stadium	Bangkok, Thailand	KO	4	
Wins the vacant Rajadamnern Stadium Bantamweight (118 lbs) title.
1980-01-22	Win	(Thailand) Paruhat Loh-ngoen	Lumpinee Stadium	Bangkok, Thailand	Decision	5	3:00
Wins the Lumpinee Stadium Bantamweight (118 lbs) Champion.
1979-11-27	Win	(Thailand) Fah-Uthai Pitsanurachan	Lumpinee Stadium	Bangkok, Thailand	KO (Punches)	2	
1980-10-23	Win	(Thailand) Densiam Sor.Prateep	Lumpinee Stadium	Bangkok, Thailand	Decision	5	3:00
1979-07-06	Win	(Thailand) Atthapee Boonroj	Lumpinee Stadium	Bangkok, Thailand	KO (Punches)	1	
1978-09-25	NC	(Thailand) Sakda Sakwiangchan	Suadam, Rajadamnern Stadium	Bangkok, Thailand	Mafuang dismissed	5	
1978-08-25	Win	(Thailand) Samroengchai Saksaengchan	Lumpinee Stadium	Bangkok, Thailand	KO (Punches)	3	
1978-07-25	Loss	(Thailand) Apisit Sathiangym	Lumpinee Stadium	Bangkok, Thailand	Decision	5	3:00
1978-06-06	Win	(Thailand) Pleungsawan Sitbowon	Thahan Suea, Lumpinee Stadium	Bangkok, Thailand	KO (Punches)	2	
1978-05-09	Win	(Thailand) Dawut Sor.Or.Nor.	Thahan Suea, Lumpinee Stadium	Bangkok, Thailand	KO	1	
1978-03-20	Win	(Thailand) Sittisak Sitkhun	Lumpinee Stadium	Bangkok, Thailand	Decision	5	3:00
1978-02-13	Win	(Thailand) Chaiyan Singmuanglop	Rajadamnern Stadium	Bangkok, Thailand	KO	3	
	Win	(Thailand) Denphimai Kiatwiboon	Lumpinee Stadium	Bangkok, Thailand	KO	3	
Legend: Win Loss Draw/No contest Notes
