= Yuri Arbachakov =

Russian boxer (born 1966)

Personal information
- Nickname: Yuri Ebihara
- Nationality: Russian
- Born: Yuri Yakovlevich Arbachakov; October 22, 1966 (age 59) Kemerovo Oblast, Russian SFSR, Soviet Union
- Height: 5 ft 4 in (163 cm)
- Weight: Flyweight

Boxing career
- Stance: Orthodox

Boxing record
- Total fights: 24
- Wins: 23
- Win by KO: 16
- Losses: 1

Yuri Yakovlevich Arbachakov (Russian: Юрий Яковлевич Арбачаков; born October 22, 1966) is a Russian former professional boxer who competed from 1990 to 1997. He held the WBC flyweight title from 1992 to 1997.

== Amateur career ==
Yuri Arbachakov
Medal record

Representing Soviet Union

Men's Boxing

World Amateur Championships
Gold medal – first place	Moscow 1989	Flyweight

European Amateur Championships
Gold medal – first place	1989 Athens	Flyweight

Yuri Arbachakov was born on October 22, 1966, in the village of Ust-Kezes, Kemerovo Oblast into a Shor family. He first began boxing at the age of 13.

Arbachakov was an amateur boxing star in the Soviet Union. He was a Soviet national champion and gold medalist at both the world and European championships, winning 165 of 186 amateur fights.

== Professional boxing career ==
Arbachakov emigrated to Japan as part of the perestroika program, along with Orzubek Nazarov. He trained with the Kyoei boxing gym, and fought almost all of his fights in Japan. He made his professional debut in February, 1990, under the name "Yuri Chakov", in the bantamweight division. In 1991, his gym changed his ring name to "Yuri Ebihara", (after former world champion Hiroyuki Ebihara) and in July of that year, he won the Japanese flyweight title in his seventh professional bout, by 1st-round knockout. He defended the title once before returning it.

In June, 1992, he challenged Muangchai Kittikasem for the WBC and lineal flyweight titles, and won by 8th-round knockout. He would go on to defend his titles nine times over five years.

After winning the world titles, he took out "Ebihara" from his ring name, and began fighting as "Yuri Arbachakov". He made this change because "Ebi" closely resembles the Russian word for "fuck".

In August, 1996, he made his 9th defense by 8th-round KO, but injured his right hand during the fight. The injury forced him into a long period of inactivity.

His 10th defense was scheduled for November, 1997, over a year since his last fight. Chatchai Sasakul had become the WBC flyweight interim champion during Arbachakov's inactivity, and the two had previously fought in September, 1995, with Arbachakov emerging victorious by decision. However, Sasakul won the rematch by 12-round decision, and Arbachakov announced his retirement after the fight. His professional record was 23-1-0 (16KOs).

== Retirement ==
He has returned to his home country, Russia, where he now runs his own boxing gym in St. Petersburg.

== Professional boxing record ==
24 fights	23 wins	1 loss
By knockout	16	0
By decision	7	1

No.	Result	Record	Opponent	Type	Round	Date	Location	Notes
24	Loss	23–1	Chatchai Sasakul	UD	12	Nov 12, 1997	Tsukisamu Green Dome, Sapporo, Japan	Lost WBC flyweight title
23	Win	23–0	Puma Toguchi	TKO	9 (12)	Aug 26, 1996	Kokugikan, Japan	Retained WBC flyweight title
22	Win	22–0	Raul Juarez	UD	12	Feb 5, 1996	Osaka-Jo Hall, Osaka, Japan	Retained WBC flyweight title
21	Win	21–0	Chatchai Sasakul	UD	12	Sep 25, 1995	Nippon Budokan, Japan	Retained WBC flyweight title
20	Win	20–0	Oscar Arciniega	UD	12	Jan 30, 1995	Green Dome, Sapporo, Japan	Retained WBC flyweight title
19	Win	19–0	Hugo Rafael Soto	KO	8 (12)	Aug 1, 1994	Ariake Colosseum, Japan	Retained WBC flyweight title
18	Win	18–0	Hiroshi Kobayashi	KO	9 (10)	May 16, 1994	Korakuen Hall, Japan	
17	Win	17–0	Nam-Hoon Cha	UD	12	Dec 13, 1993	Municipal Gymnasium, Kyoto, Japan	Retained WBC flyweight title
16	Win	16–0	Ysaias Zamudio	UD	12	Jul 16, 1993	World Memorial Hall, Kobe, Japan	Retained WBC flyweight title
15	Win	15–0	Muangchai Kittikasem	TKO	9 (12)	Mar 20, 1993	Lop Buri, Thailand	Retained WBC flyweight title
14	Win	14–0	Yoon-Un Jin	UD	12	Oct 20, 1992	Korakuen Hall, Japan	Retained WBC flyweight title
13	Win	13–0	Muangchai Kittikasem	KO	8 (12)	Jun 23, 1992	Kokugikan, Japan	Won WBC flyweight title
12	Win	12–0	Sucatchai Chalermsri	KO	3 (?)	Apr 20, 1992	Japan	
11	Win	11–0	Samanchai Chalermsri	PTS	10	Mar 16, 1992	Korakuen Hall, Japan	
10	Win	10–0	Shun Hazama	TKO	5 (10)	Nov 25, 1991	Korakuen Hall, Japan	
9	Win	9–0	Byung Kab Kim	KO	5 (10)	Sep 30, 1991	Korakuen Hall, Japan	
8	Win	8–0	Takahiro Mizuno	KO	1 (10)	Jul 15, 1991	Japan	
7	Win	7–0	Hyun Ki Lee	KO	4 (?)	Mar 16, 1991	Korakuen Hall, Japan	
6	Win	6–0	Rolando Bohol	KO	2 (?)	Dec 20, 1990	Korakuen Hall, Japan	
5	Win	5–0	Justo Zuniga	TKO	5 (10)	Oct 29, 1990	Korakuen Hall, Japan	
4	Win	4–0	Jung Eui Hyun	TKO	7 (10)	Jun 23, 1990	Korakuen Hall, Japan	
3	Win	3–0	Diego Ongalo	KO	1 (?)	May 7, 1990	Korakuen Hall, Japan	
2	Win	2–0	Jae-Hyun Kim	KO	5 (?)	Apr 12, 1990	Korakuen Hall, Japan	
1	Win	1–0	Allan Tanaka	TKO	3 (6)	Feb 1, 1990	Kokugikan, Japan	

== See also ==
- List of flyweight boxing champions
- List of WBC world champions
- List of Japanese boxing world champions
- Boxing in Japan

Sporting positions
World boxing titles
Preceded by Muangchai Kittikasem	WBC flyweight champion June 23, 1992 - November 12, 1997	Succeeded by Chatchai Sasakul
