= Yodtong Senanan =

Muay Thai trainer

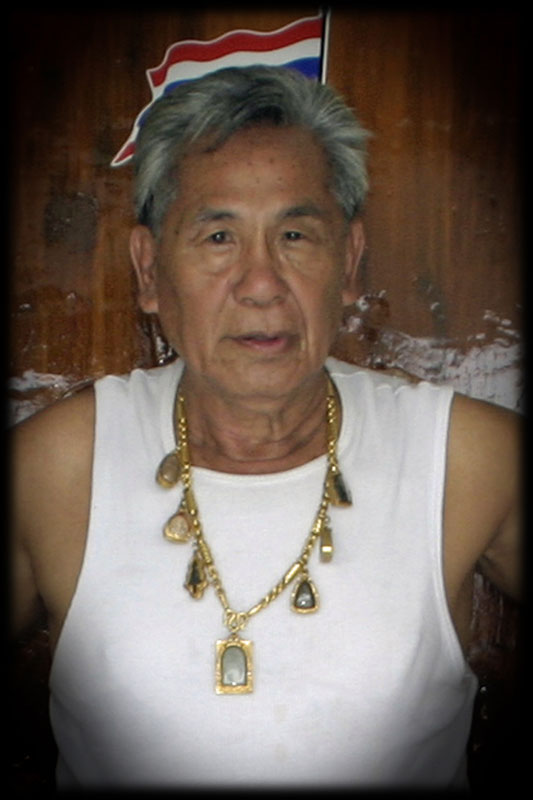
- Born: Pu Tui (Thai: ตุ๊ย แซ่ผู่); August 28, 1937; Ban Pong, Ratchaburi, Thailand
- Died: February 8, 2013 (aged 75); Chonburi, Thailand
- Other names: Yodtong Siriwalak, Yodtong Senanan, Kru Tui
- Occupation: Muay Thai trainer

Yodtong Siriwalak (Thai: ยอดธง ศรีวราลักษณ์, RTGS: Yotthong Siwaralak; 28 August 1937 – 8 February 2013) most commonly known by his Muay Thai ring name Yodtong Senanan (Thai: ยอดธง เสนานันท์) or Kru Tui (ครูตุ้ย or ครูตุ๊ย) was a Muay Thai fighter, trainer, and owner of the Sityodtong Muay Thai Camp in Chonburi, Thailand. He produced 57 Muay Thai champions, the most in the sport's history in Thailand. His most famous champions include Samart Payakaroon, Kongtoranee Payakaroon, Nuengpichit Sityodtong, Detpitak Sityodtong, Chartchai Sityodtong, Yoddecha Sityodtong and Daotong Sityodtong. Yodtong also trained WBA Boxing world champion Yodsanan Sityodtong after he encouraged him to transition from Muay Thai to boxing at age 17. Additionally, top Muay Thai, K-1 and UFC professional fighters from around the world such as Rob Kaman, Ramon Dekkers, Ernesto Hoost, Peter Aerts, Musashi, Kenny Florian and Antonio Braga Neto have made the pilgrimage to Sityodtong Gym in Pattaya to train and sharpen their skills. His top trainers include Saknarong Sityodtong, Daorung Sityodtong, Chatri Sityodtong, Yodsanan Sityodtong and Kongtoranee Sityodtong.

== Early life ==
Yodtong was born Pu Tui (Thai: ตุ๊ย แซ่ผู่) in Ban Pong District of Ratchaburi province. His father was a Chinese immigrant from Hainan. Yodtong had four brothers and two sisters, and later moved to Bang Lamung district, Chonburi province, when he was 13 to live with his sister.

== Fighting career ==
Yodtong started training in Muay Thai from age 14 under Kru Sithidet Samanachan (Thai: สิทธิเดช สมานฉันท์), and his first fight came shortly after his 15th birthday. His first ring name was Erawan Detprasit Banpra (after his camp Detrprasit and his stadium Banpra). At 17, he moved to the Senanan camp to train under Kru Suwan Senanan and adopted his teacher's surname as his ring name. Yodtong then began teaching other fighters in Muay Thai. He continued to fight professionally until age 21, after which he went into semi-retirement; he fought only if the money was right. Yodtong had a combined 49 bouts.

== Coaching career ==
Yodtong founded his own camp in 1959 at Mabtapud municipality, Rayong province. He stayed in Mabtapud for approximately 15 years before moving his camp to the Banglamung district of Chonburi, where it remains. In 1971, Daothong Sityodtong became the first champion produced by the gym, winning the Lumpini Stadium Championship. In 1972, Yodtong's fighters engaged in a memorable feud with Japanese kickboxers led by Osamu Noguchi.

On November 1, 2005, Yodtong won the first prize in the Thai lottery worth 56 million baht. He kept approximately 10 million baht for himself and donated the rest to charity, making him extremely popular in Banglamung district.

Kru Yodtong appointed one of his students, Chatri Sityodtong, to be the conservator of Muay Thai in Asia. Mark Dellagrotte of UFC fame is a conservator of Muay Thai in the U.S. under Kru Yodtong Senanan. Several Sityodtong Muay Thai camps have been set up around the world.

Kru Yodtong Senanan lived in Chonburi province until his death at age 75 in 2013.

== Awards and recognition ==
- Honorary Doctorate in Muay Thai Studies, Ratchapat University, Jom Bueng Village Campus
- Award for the Best Muay Thai Trainer in the Nation, conferred by Princess Sirindhorn on 11 May 1991
- Highest Honor in Muay Thai from the International Federation of Amateur Muay Thai Associations

== Bibliography ==
- Siam Sport Daily, Obituary for Yodtong Sriwaralak (Senanan) (in Thai), 13 February 2013
- Pattaya Daily News, Funeral Rites for Kru Tui (in Thai), 18 February 2013
