= Richard Clarke (boxer) =

Jamaican boxer (born 1963)

Richard Derrick Clarke
Personal information
- Nickname: Shrimpy
- Born: 20 April 1963 (age 63) Kingston, Jamaica
- Weight: fly/super flyweight

Boxing career
- Stance: Orthodox

Boxing record
- Total fights: 32
- Wins: 27 (KO 7)
- Losses: 7 (KO 2)
- Draws: 0

Richard "Shrimpy" Clarke (born 20 April 1963 in Kingston) is a Jamaican professional fly/super flyweight boxer of the 1980s and '90s who won the World Boxing Council (WBC) Continental Americas flyweight title, WBC International light flyweight title, and British Commonwealth flyweight title, and was a challenger for the WBC flyweight title against Sot Chitalada, and North American Boxing Federation (NABF) flyweight title against Ysaias Zamudio, his professional fighting weight varied from 109 1/2 lb (49.7 kg; 7 st 11.5 lb), i.e. flyweight to 115 lb (52 kg; 8 st 3 lb), i.e. super flyweight.

Personal Life Clarke was born in Kingston Jamaica to mother Doreen Simmonds and father Glen Clarke. He grew up in Kingston along Studley Park Road. Clarke attended Chetolah Park Primary, Kingston Secondary school and Eastern Academy. He married in 1997 to Juliet Hewitt (Entrepreneur) and the couple had three children Derrick aka Khafari (Actor), Kashief (Disc Jockey) and Rayvon (Employee).

Career and Work Clarke is currently the head coach of the Stanley Couch Gym in Downtown, Kingston. He coached former Wray and Nephew Contender Champion Donovan "Police" Campbell. He is also employed as a Sports Officer at the Institute of Sports (INSports) located at Kingston's National Arena.
