= Samart Payakaroon =

Thai boxer and former Muay Thai fighter (born 1962)

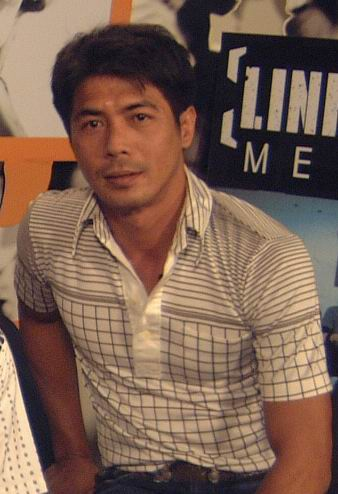
- Samart in 2006
- Born: Samart Thipthamai (สามารถ ทิพย์ท่าไม้)); 5 December 1962 (age 63); Chacherngsao, Thailand
- Native name: สามารถ ภพธีรธรรม
- Nickname: Jade-faced Tiger (พยัคฆ์หน้าหยก); Jade-faced Executioner (เพชฌฆาตหน้าหยก)
- Height: 172 cm (5 ft 8 in)
- Division: Pinweight; Light Flyweight; Super Flyweight; Super Bantamweight; Featherweight
- Style: Muay Thai (Muay Femur); Boxing
- Stance: Southpaw
- Team: Songchai Rattanasuban; Sahasompop Srisomwong; Suchart Kerdmek
- Trainer: Yodtong Senanan (Muay Thai); Sukjai Sappalek (Boxing); Ismael Salas (Boxing)

Professional boxing record
- Total: 23
- Wins: 21
- By knockout: 12
- Losses: 2
- By knockout: 2
- Draws: 0

Kickboxing record
- Total: 250
- Wins: 200
- Losses: 48
- Draws: 2

Other information
- Notable relatives: Kongtoranee Payakaroon (older brother)
- Boxing record from BoxRec

Samart Popteeratham (Thai: สามารถ ภพธีรธรรม, IPA: [sǎːmâːt pʰóptʰīːrāːtʰām]; born Samart Thipthamai; December 5, 1962), known professionally as Samart Payakaroon (สามารถ พยัคฆ์อรุณ, pronounced [sǎːmâːt pʰájákʔārūn]), is a Thai former professional Muay Thai fighter, professional boxer, and entertainer. He is a former four-division Lumpinee Stadium champion and WBC World Super Bantamweight Champion, as well as the 1981 and 1988 Sports Writers Association of Thailand Fighter of the Year, who was famous in the 1980s and 1990s. He is widely considered one of the greatest Muay Thai fighters of all time.

He has also released several successful albums in Thailand and appeared in multiple films and TV shows. Nowadays he works as a Muay Thai trainer at his own gym in Bangkok. His students include elite fighters such as Chalamchon SamartPrayakaroonGym.

== Biography and fighting career ==
=== Muay Thai ===
Samart Thipthamai was born December 5, 1962, in Chacherngsao, Thailand.

He began Muay Thai training at 10 years old after being introduced by his older brother, Manus Thipthamai. The First Muay Thai teacher of Payakaroon was Yodtong Senanan (Kru Tui) who taught both brothers. His first fight name was Lotus. After he fought about a dozen fights, he came to Bangkok to fight at Lumpinee Stadium in 1978.

He possessed an extremely high ring IQ, with lightning quick reflexes, and excellent ring vision. He also fought using creative techniques that were effective and unpredictable, even against elite competition in the 80s and 90s (dubbed the Golden Age of Muay Thai). There were contests where Payakaroon was pushed past the brink of exhaustion, and still gave his opponents the fight of their lives. Even in the period where he was more concerned about his music and acting career, he defeated some of the greatest fighters of his generation.

=== Boxing ===
In 1982, he turned to boxing where he fought from a southpaw stance. In 1986, he won a WBC junior featherweight title with a surprise KO over rock-chinned Lupe Pintor in the fifth round and defended against the respected Juan Meza before being stopped by undefeated Australian Jeff Fenech. He made a comeback in the 1990s and challenged unsuccessfully for another world title.

Payakaroon was named The Ring's Progress of the Year fighter for 1986. He now teaches Muay Thai and Boxing in Thailand.

== Titles and accomplishments ==
Muay Thai

- Lumpinee Stadium
  - 1980 Lumpinee Stadium Pinweight (102 lbs) Champion
  - 1980 Lumpinee Stadium Mini Flyweight (105 lbs) Champion
  - 1981 Lumpinee Stadium Super Flyweight (115 lbs) Champion
  - 1981 Lumpinee Stadium Featherweight (126 lbs) Champion
- Awards
  - 1981 Sports Writers Association of Thailand Fighter of the Year
  - 1981 Sports Writers Association of Thailand Fight of the Year (vs Mafuang Weerapol)
  - 1982 Sports Writers Association of Thailand Fight of the Year (vs Dieselnoi Chor Thanasukarn)
  - 1983 Sports Writers Association of Thailand Fighter of the Year
  - 1988 Sports Writers Association of Thailand Fight of the Year (vs Panomtuanlek Hapalang)
  - 1988 Sports Writers Association of Thailand Fighter of the Year

Boxing

- World Boxing Council
  - 1986 WBC World Super Bantamweight (122 lbs) Champion

== Entertainment career ==
=== Music ===
Between his two stints as boxing champion, Samart signed with Grammy Entertainment, which he released three albums. They are pop music but with his upcountry accent (ner, Thai: เหน่อ) as opposed to central Thailand accent. His first album, Rock Ner Ner. (ร็อคเหน่อๆ) in 1989, contains a famous song On Som (อ่อนซ้อม - not enough practice) talking about him being very proficient in boxing but lacking the same aptitude at getting love from women. His second and third album, Arom Dee (อารมณ์ดี) and Kun Mai Kun Mike (คันไม้คันไมค์) followed in 1990 and 1992 with famous songs Nam Plik Pla Too (น้ำพริกปลาทู) and Kao Ao Eng (เกาเอาเอง) respectively. After the release of three albums, he went back to boxing.

=== Acting ===
In 2000, Samart starred as a minor antagonist named Chartchai Payakaroon in A Fighter's Blues. He had a role in the 2001 Thai film, The Legend of Suriyothai. He had a major role in the French drama film, Fureur, and was in the 2004 film, The Bodyguard. In 2006, he co-starred in the Thai martial arts film, Dynamite Warrior. He appeared in Muay Thai Chaiya in 2007.

In 2015, his biography has created a documentary film released in Mard Payak (มาดพยัคฆ์; "Tiger Style") by NOW26 in a network of Nation Multimedia Group.

== Legacy ==
Samart is considered to be the "Muhammad Ali" and "Sugar Ray Robinson" of Muay Thai. His name holds prestige for followers of the sport to this day.

His first name, Samart, translates to "Capable" in Thai and his last name, "Payakaroon," translates to "Tiger of the Dawn." This, in addition with his handsome appearance earned him the nickname "Jade-faced Tiger."

== Professional boxing record ==
23 fights	21 wins	2 losses
By knockout	12	2
By decision	9	0

No.	Result	Record	Opponent	Type	Round	Date	Location	Notes
23	Loss	21–2	Eloy Rojas	TKO	8 (12)	11 Sep 1994	Clarion MP Resort, Trang, Thailand	For WBA featherweight title
22	Win	21–1	Jerry Villacorta	KO	5 (10)	10 Apr 1994	Anusom Stadium, Samut Prakan, Thailand	
21	Win	20–1	Boyet Andales	PTS	10	13 Feb 1994	Provincial Gymnasium, Chachoengsao, Thailand	
20	Win	19–1	Tiger Ari	PTS	10	23 Jan 1994	Provincial Stadium, Surat Thani, Thailand	
19	Win	18–1	Ignacio Jacome	KO	5 (10)	14 Nov 1993	Bangkok, Thailand	
18	Win	17–1	Rudy Cabiles	PTS	10	8 May 1993	Bangkok, Thailand	
17	Win	16–1	Hector Cortez	TKO	4 (10)	27 Feb 1988	Samut Sakhon, Thailand	
16	Win	15–1	Hogan Noguchi	TKO	9 (10)	8 Nov 1987	Chachoengsao, Thailand	
15	Loss	14–1	Jeff Fenech	KO	4 (12)	8 May 1987	Entertainment Centre, Sydney, Australia	Lost WBC super-bantamweight title
14	Win	14–0	Juan Meza	TKO	12 (12)	10 Dec 1986	Huamark Stadium, Bangkok, Thailand	Retained WBC super-bantamweight title
13	Win	13–0	Rafael Gandarilla	PTS	10	20 Jun 1986	Paris, France	
12	Win	12–0	Lupe Pintor	KO	5 (12)	18 Jan 1986	Huamark Stadium, Bangkok, Thailand	Won vacant WBC super-bantamweight title
11	Win	11–0	Byung-Soo Park	KO	6 (10)	17 Nov 1985	Bangkok, Thailand	
10	Win	10–0	Thongberm Vongvianyai	KO	8 (10)	13 Oct 1985	Bangkok, Thailand	
9	Win	9–0	Chor Haphalang	KO	6 (10)	15 Sep 1985	Bangkok, Thailand	
8	Win	8–0	Jaime Enriquez	PTS	10	22 Jun 1985	Bangkok, Thailand	
7	Win	7–0	Young Ho Lee	PTS	10	24 Apr 1985	Bangkok, Thailand	
6	Win	6–0	Ekalak Singnakornlueng	PTS	10	6 Feb 1985	Bangkok, Thailand	
5	Win	5–0	Farid Gallouze	TKO	4 (10)	9 Nov 1984	Bangkok, Thailand	
4	Win	4–0	Neptali Alamag	TKO	7 (10)	31 Jul 1984	Bangkok, Thailand	
3	Win	3–0	Saipa Monod	KO	1 (10)	12 Jun 1984	Bangkok, Thailand	
2	Win	2–0	Juanito Favila	UD	10	24 Apr 1984	Bangkok, Thailand	
1	Win	1–0	Netrnoi Sor Vorasingh	PTS	10	24 Aug 1982	Lumpinee Stadium, Bangkok, Thailand	

== Muay Thai record ==
Muay Thai Record
200 Wins, 48 Losses, 2 Draws
Date	Result	Opponent	Event	Location	Method	Round	Time
2001-01-20	Loss	(Armenia) Varazdat Mihranyan	Muay Thai combat - Sidekick Promotion	Inglewood, California, US	Decision	5	3:00
1994	Win	(Netherlands) Maikel Lieuwfat		Germany	Decision	5	3:00
1993-12-10	Win	(Republic of Ireland) Paul Lenehan	Palais des Sports Stadium	Paris, France	TKO (Knees)	3	2:40
1993-12-04	Win	(Netherlands) Gilbert Ballantine	King's Birthday	Bangkok, Thailand	Decision (Unanimous)	5	3:00
1993-10-02	Win	(Germany) Murat Comert	Palais des Sports Stadium	Paris, France	TKO (Retirement)	2	3:00
1993-04-24	Win	(Japan) Satoshi Niizuma	MAJKF	Tokyo, Japan	Decision (Unanimous)	5	3:00
1989-05-10	Loss	(Thailand) Wangchannoi Sor.Palangchai	Yodmuaylok, Lumpinee Stadium	Bangkok, Thailand	Decision (Unanimous)	5	3:00
1989-01-06	Win	(Thailand) Jaroenthong Kiatbanchong	Onesongchai, Lumpinee Stadium	Bangkok, Thailand	KO (Right hook)	1	
1988-12-02	Win	(Thailand) Namphon Nongkeepahuyuth	Onesongchai, Lumpinee Stadium	Bangkok, Thailand	Decision (Unanimous)	5	3:00
1988-10-28	Win	(Thailand) Namphon Nongkeepahuyuth	Onesongchai, Lumpinee Stadium	Bangkok, Thailand	TKO (Doctor stoppage)	3	
1988-06-24	Win	(Thailand) Samransak Muangsurin	Onesongchai, Lumpinee Stadium	Bangkok, Thailand	Decision (Unanimous)	5	3:00
1988-05-26	Win	(Thailand) Samransak Muangsurin	Lumpinee Stadium	Bangkok, Thailand	Decision	5	3:00
1988-01-26	Win	(Thailand) Panomtuanlek Hapalang	Lumpinee Stadium	Bangkok, Thailand	KO (Punches)	1	
1984-09-21	Win	(Thailand) Wattana Soudareth		Paris, France	TKO (Right uppercut)	4	
1983-12-28	Win	(Thailand) Samart Prasarnmit	Rajadamnern Stadium	Bangkok, Thailand	Decision (Unanimous)	5	3:00
Receives the Yodmuaythai trophy.
1983-11-11	Win	(Thailand) Chamuekpet Hapalang	Onesongchai, Lumpinee Stadium	Bangkok, Thailand	Decision (Unanimous)	5	3:00
1983-10-13	Win	(Thailand) Rachabut Sor.Thanikul	Rajadamnern Stadium	Bangkok, Thailand	Decision	5	3:00
1983-08-24	Win	(Thailand) Kitti Sor.Thanikul	Rajadamnern Stadium	Bangkok, Thailand	Decision (Unanimous)	5	3:00
1983-04-05	Win	(Thailand) Samransak Muangsurin	Onesongchai, Lumpinee Stadium	Bangkok, Thailand	Decision (Unanimous)	5	3:00
Defends the Lumpinee Stadium Featherweight (126 lbs) title.
1983-02-04	Win	(Thailand) Samingnoom Sithiboontham	Lumpinee Stadium	Bangkok, Thailand	Decision	5	3:00
1982-12-24	Loss	(Thailand) Dieselnoi Chor Thanasukarn	Onesongchai, Rajadamnern Stadium	Bangkok, Thailand	Decision (Unanimous)	5	3:00
1982-05-10	Win	(Thailand) Padejsuk Pitsanurachan	Rajadamnern Stadium	Bangkok, Thailand	Decision	5	3:00
1982-03-12	Win	(Thailand) Padejsuk Pitsanurachan	Lumpinee Stadium	Bangkok, Thailand	Decision	5	3:00
1982-01-15	Win	(Thailand) Nongkhai Sor.Prapatsorn	Lumpinee Stadium	Bangkok, Thailand	Decision (Unanimous)	5	3:00
1981-11-09	Win	(Thailand) Kitti Sor.Thanikul	Rajadamnern Stadium	Bangkok, Thailand	Decision	5	3:00
1981-10-13	Win	(Thailand) Samingnoom Sithiboontham	Onesongchai, Lumpinee Stadium	Bangkok, Thailand	Decision (Unanimous)	5	3:00
Wins the vacant Lumpinee Stadium Featherweight (126 lbs) title.
1981-09-04	Win	(Thailand) Paruhat Loh-ngoen	Onesongchai, Lumpinee Stadium	Bangkok, Thailand	Decision (Unanimous)	5	3:00
1981-06-09	Win	(Thailand) Mafuang Weerapol	Lumpinee Stadium	Bangkok, Thailand	Decision	5	3:00
1981-04-28	Win	(Thailand) Fonluang Luksadetmaepuanthong	Onesongchai, Lumpinee Stadium	Bangkok, Thailand	Decision (Unanimous)	5	3:00
1981-03-31	Win	(Thailand) Singthong Prasopchai	Lumpinee Stadium	Bangkok, Thailand	Decision	5	3:00
Wins the inaugural Lumpinee Stadium Super Flyweight (115 lbs) title.
1981-01-13	Win	(Thailand) Poollap Saknirun	Onesongchai, Lumpinee Stadium	Bangkok, Thailand	Decision	5	3:00
1980-12-02	Win	(Thailand) Chamuekpet Hapalang	Lumpinee Stadium	Bangkok, Thailand	Decision	5	3:00
1980-11-11	Win	(Thailand) Poollap Saknirun	Lumpinee Stadium	Bangkok, Thailand	Decision	5	3:00
Wins the vacant Lumpinee Stadium Light Flyweight (108 lbs) title.
1980-10-14	Win	(Thailand) Hanuman Sitporluang	Lumpinee Stadium	Bangkok, Thailand	Decision	5	3:00
1980-09-23	Win	(Thailand) Bangkhlanoi Sor.Thanikul	Lumpinee Stadium	Bangkok, Thailand	Decision	5	3:00
1980-09-05	NC	(Thailand) Jampatong Na Nontachai	Onesongchai, Lumpinee Stadium	Bangkok, Thailand	Jampatong dismissed	5	
1980-08-08	Loss	(Thailand) Chamuekpet Hapalang	Lumpinee Stadium	Bangkok, Thailand	Decision	5	3:00
Loses the Lumpinee Stadium Pinweight (102 lbs) title.
1980-06-27	Loss	(Thailand) Bangkhlanoi Sor.Thanikul	Lumpinee Stadium	Bangkok, Thailand	Decision	5	3:00
1980-06-06	Win	(Thailand) Paruhatlek Sitchunthong	Lumpinee Stadium	Bangkok, Thailand	Decision	5	3:00
Defends the Lumpinee Stadium Pinweight (102 lbs) title.
1980-04-29	Win	(Thailand) Prabpipop Lukklongtan	Lumpinee Stadium	Bangkok, Thailand	Decision	5	3:00
1980-03-28	Win	(Thailand) Sonsil Sit.Nerpayong	Lumpinee Stadium	Bangkok, Thailand	Decision	5	3:00
1980-03-14	Win	(Thailand) Paruhatlek Sitchunthong		Pattaya, Thailand	Decision	5	3:00
1980-02-11	Win	(Thailand) Kongsamut Sor.Thanikul	Lumpinee Stadium	Bangkok, Thailand	Decision	5	3:00
Wins the Lumpinee Stadium Pinweight (102 lbs) title.
1979-12-30	Draw	(Thailand) Sichanglek Look K.M-6	Lumpinee Stadium	Bangkok, Thailand	Decision	5	3:00
1979-12-02	Win	(Thailand) Praseurtsak Singthapraya		Sa Kaeo Province, Thailand	KO	1	
1979-11-02	Win	(Thailand) Chaowalit Sitpraprom	Lumpinee Stadium	Bangkok, Thailand	Decision	5	3:00
1979-08-17	Loss	(Thailand) Paruhatlek Sitchunthong	Onesongchai, Lumpinee Stadium	Bangkok, Thailand	KO	3	
1979-06-26	Loss	(Thailand) Jampatong Na Nontachai	Lumpinee Stadium	Bangkok, Thailand	Decision	5	3:00
1979-06-08	Loss	(Thailand) Jampatong Na Nontachai	Lumpinee Stadium	Bangkok, Thailand	Decision	5	3:00
1979-03-23	Win	(Thailand) Saksuriya Fairtex	Rajadamnern Stadium	Bangkok, Thailand	Decision	5	3:00
1979-02-25	Draw	(Thailand) Pharuatlek Sitchunthong	Lumpinee Stadium	Bangkok, Thailand	Decision	5	3:00
1979-02-13	Win	(Thailand) Sichanglek Look KM-16	Lumpinee Stadium	Bangkok, Thailand	Decision	5	3:00
1979-01-01	Win	(Thailand) Chaowalit Sitpraprom		Sa Kaeo Province, Thailand	Decision	5	3:00
1978-11-20	Win	(Thailand) Sichanglek Look K.M-6	Rajadamnern Stadium	Bangkok, Thailand	Decision	5	3:00
1978-08-06	Win	(Thailand) Payakmok Surakosang	Rajadamnern Stadium	Bangkok, Thailand	Decision	5	3:00
1978-07-20	Win	(Thailand) Saengpetch Sor. Wongsiam		Chanthaburi Province, Thailand	Decision	5	3:00
1978-07-03	Win	(Thailand) Aunhain Lookbanplai		Mae Hong Son Province, Thailand	Decision	5	3:00
1978-05-23	Loss	(Thailand) Thaninoi Sakniran	Lumpinee Stadium 100 lbs	Bangkok, Thailand	Decision	5	3:00
1978-05-05	Win	(Thailand) Gakao Sitchuchai		Sam Yan, Thailand	Decision	5	3:00
1978-04-23	Win	(Thailand) Pornchai Sithaosing		Pong District, Thailand	KO	2	
1978-04-15	Win	(Thailand) Sampownoi Janjira		Ratchaburi Province, Thailand	KO	3	
1978-04-03	Win	(Thailand) Kiatwiwath Lookchaimai		Rayong Province, Thailand	KO	4	
1978-03-27	Loss	(Thailand) Awout Sor. Thanikhul		Nonthaburi Province, Thailand	Decision	5	3:00
1978-03-02	Win	(Thailand) Maewnoi Singtchakawan		Samrong District, Thailand	Decision	5	3:00
1978-02-19	Win	(Thailand) Jokceynoi Por. Muang U-bon		Phanat Nikhom District, Thailand	Decision	5	3:00
1978-02-01	Loss	(Thailand) Thaninoi Saknilan		Chanthaburi Province, Thailand	Decision	5	3:00
1978-01-18	Loss	(Thailand) Ruengchai Thairungruang		Chonburi Province, Thailand	Decision	5	3:00
1977-12-13	Loss	(Thailand) Payom Chokchaisith		Chai Nat Province, Thailand	Decision	5	3:00
1977-08-04	Win	(Thailand) Cheugchai Sithseri		Ban Bueng District, Thailand	KO	3	
1977-06-20	Win	(Thailand) Sittichai Sanangym		Phanat Nikhom District, Thailand	Decision	5	3:00
1977-03-19	Win	(Thailand) Sittichai Sanangym		Pak Kret District, Thailand	Decision	5	3:00
1977-01-24	Win	(Thailand) Saksuriya Fairtex		Nakhon Pathom Province, Thailand	Decision	5	3:00
1976-12-01	Win	(Thailand) Chattamin Sithpratana		Kalasin Province, Thailand	KO	1	
1976-10-30	Win	(Thailand) Pongkramnoi Sor. Kingstar		Roi Et Province, Thailand	Decision	5	3:00
1976-07-12	Win	(Thailand) Awout Sor. Thanikhul		Phitsanulok, Thailand	Decision	5	3:00
1976-07-12	Win	(Thailand) Pornsawan Sitsuwan		Nakhon Ratchasima, Thailand	KO	1	
1976-03-03	Win	(Thailand) Payak Lookmakramkou		Pattaya, Thailand	KO	1	
1976-02-19	Win	(Thailand) Nomtanong Sitsaengsawang		Kanchanaburi, Thailand	KO	2	
1976-02-07	Win	(Thailand) Sama-air Sitsamrith		Nakhon Ratchasima, Thailand	KO	2	
1976-01-	Win	(Thailand) Koukong Sor. Sawangtith		Samrong District, Thailand	Decision	5	3:00
1976-01-07	Win	(Thailand) Sama-air Sitsamrith		Bangkok, Thailand	KO	2	
1975-12-	Win	(Thailand) Pinchai Singbanlao		Bangkok, Thailand	Decision	5	3:00
1975-12-	Win	(Thailand) Somyoth Lookchaomai		Trat Province, Thailand	KO	2	
1975-12-10	Win	(Thailand) Petchmani Lookbanlao		Trat Province, Thailand	Decision	5	3:00
1975-12-04	Win	(Thailand) Pounsak Sitworawath		Chanthaburi Province, Thailand	KO	1	
1975-11-20	Win	(Thailand) Uangfah Sittrangloig		Chanthaburi Province, Thailand	KO	3	
1975-11-12	Win	(Thailand) Bangsai Sitsaithong		Rayong, Thailand	Decision	5	3:00
1975-10-27	Win	(Thailand) Panetchone Lookbanprao		Lat Phrao District, Thailand	KO	4	
1975-10-26	Win	(Thailand) Thaksin Lookkraosaming		Trat Province, Thailand	KO	3	
1975-10-04	Win	(Thailand) Surasak Sakpraseurt		Trat Province, Thailand	Decision	5	3:00
1975-09-30	Win	(Thailand) Ayduan Hatari		Bang Lamung District, Thailand	Decision	5	3:00
1975-09-20	Win	(Thailand) Thanoukranong Latsaminaga		Trat Province, Thailand	KO	3	
1975-08-31	Win	(Thailand) Koukong Sor. Sawangtith		Bang Lamung District, Thailand	Decision	5	3:00
1975-08-17	Win	(Thailand) Kao Sor. Bantchongsak		Trat Province, Thailand	KO	2	
1975-08-07	Win	(Thailand) Chaowalit Sitpraprom		Bang Lamung District, Thailand	KO	1	
1975-05-05	Loss	(Thailand) Bangkhlanoi Sor.Thanikul		Samrong District, Thailand	Decision	5	3:00
1975-03-29	Loss	(Thailand) Thai Looksamet		Thailand	Decision	5	3:00
1975-02-29	Win	(Thailand) Chaowalit Sitpraprom		Bangkok, Thailand	Decision	5	3:00
1975-02-10	Win	(Thailand) Tchongdi Srisopa		Ayutthaya Province, Thailand	Decision	5	3:00
1975-01-19	Win	(Thailand) Chamnaseuk Na.Pattaya		Ban Khai District, Thailand	Decision	5	3:00
1975-01-10	Loss	(Thailand) Thai Looksamet		Bang Lamung District, Thailand	Decision	5	3:00
1975-01-02	Loss	(Thailand) Thongchainoi Sitkrulam		Thailand	Decision	5	3:00
1974-12-09	Win	(Thailand) Chatchai Na. Bankrod		Bang Lamung District, Thailand	KO	4	
1974-11-21	Win	(Thailand) Singdam Lookhinnawong		Pattaya, Thailand	Decision	5	3:00
1974-10-16	Win	(Thailand) Bangkhlanoi Sor.Thanikul		Bang Lamung District, Thailand	Decision	5	3:00
1974-09-03	Loss	(Thailand) Thai Looksamet		Chonburi Province, Thailand	Decision	5	3:00
1974-08-19	Win	(Thailand) Pandeg Sor. Nuanhanan		Phetchaburi Province, Thailand	Decision	5	3:00
1974-07-31	Loss	(Thailand) Thongdeg Sor. Lackana		Bang Lamung District, Thailand	Decision	5	3:00
1974-05-15	Win	(Thailand) Chaowalit Sitpraprom		Bang Lamung District, Thailand	Decision	5	3:00
1974-04-16	Draw	(Thailand) Chatchai Na. Bankrod		Bang Lamung District, Thailand	Decision	5	3:00
1974-03-13	Win	(Thailand) Thongdeg Sor. Lackana		Bang Lamung District, Thailand	Decision	5	3:00
1974-03-13	Win	(Thailand) Kenoi Latsamijan		Bang Lamung District, Thailand	Decision	5	3:00
1974-02-25	Loss	(Thailand) Thongdeg Sor. Lackana		Bang Lamung District, Thailand	Decision	5	3:00
1974-01-31	Loss	(Thailand) Saenkanong Sitkruchip		Chonburi Province, Thailand	Decision	5	3:00
1974-01-27	Win	(Thailand) Chaowalit Sitpraprom		Bang Lamung District, Thailand	KO	1	
1974-01-19	Win	(Thailand) Saekson Janjira		Bang Lamung District, Thailand	KO	1	
1974-01-04	Win	(Thailand) Saekson Janjira		Pattaya, Thailand	Decision	5	3:00
Samart's first fight after joining Siyodtong gym.
1972-	Win	(Thailand) Petaroon Sitnimit		Thailand	Decision	5	3:00
Samart's first fight, won 40 baht.
Legend: Win Loss Draw/No contest Notes

== Filmography ==
=== Television dramas ===
- 2000 (ตี๋ใหญ่) (RS/Ch.3) as Chod (นายโชติ)
- 2001 (อตีตา) (Dida Video/Ch.7) as ()
- 2001 (นายฮ้อยทมิฬ) (/Ch.7) as (ทิดถึก)
- 2001 (ทองพูน โคกโพ ราษฎรเต็มขั้น) (/Ch.3) as Prasit (Dui) (ประสิทธิ์ (ดุ้ย))
- 2001 (ส่วย สะท้านแผ่นดิน) (/ITV) as ()
- 2002 (จอมคนปล้นผ่าโลก) (/Ch.7) as ()
- 2003 (สืบตำรวจโทบุญถึง) (/Ch.7) as ()
- 2004 (สะใภ้ภูธร) (/Ch.3) as ()
- 2005 (บอดี้การ์ดแดดเดียว) (/Ch.3) as ()
- 2005 (ทางหลวงทางรัก) (/Ch.3) as ()
- 2006 (เพื่อนรักเพื่อนร้าย) (/Ch.7) as Kra Thong (กระทิง)
- 2006 (โก๊ะจ๋า ป่านะโก๊ะ) (/Ch.7) as Thong Bai (ทองใบ)
- 2010 (ดิน น้ำ ลม ไฟ) (/Ch.3) as ()
- 2012 (หยกเลือดมังกร) (/Ch.7) as Kom Thoun (คมทวน)
- 2013 (สุภาพบุรุษบ้านทุ่ง) (/Ch.7) as Kamnan Jeim (กำนันเจิม)
- 2013 (แม่ค้า) (/Ch.7) as Fahkamron (ฟ้าคำรณ)
- 2014 (ลูกผู้ชายหัวใจเข้ม) (/Ch.7) as Kroo Khen (ครูเขต)
- 2014 (เนตรนาคราช) (/Ch.7) as Lung Hin (Cameos) (ลุงหิน (รับเชิญ))
- 2015 (จับกัง) (/Ch.7) as Lung Ang (ลุงอ่าง)
- 2015 (เพื่อน-แพง) (/Ch.7) as Pu Yai Phan (ผู้ใหญ่ผาด)
- 2015 (สิงห์รถบรรทุก) (/Ch.7) as ()
- 2016 (ฉันทนาสามช่า) (/Ch.7) as Thawib (ทวิป)
- 2016 (ข้ามาคนเดียว) (/Ch.7) as Kammoun (คำม่วน)
- 2017 (มือเหนือเมฆ) (/Ch.7) as Lung Ban (ลุงแบน)
- 2017 (มือปืนพ่อลูกติด) (/Ch.7) as (Cameos) ((รับเชิญ))
- 2017 (นายฮ้อยทมิฬ) (/Ch.7) as Thid Janta (ทิดจันทา)
- 2017 (มหาหิน) (/Ch.7) as Kroo Choung Kachin (ครูช่วง คเชนทร์)
- 2019 (หัวใจลูกผู้ชาย) (/Ch.7) as (จ่าเฉื่อย)
- 2019 (เสียงเอื้อนสะเทือนดาว) (/One 31) as Thonkon Thaweewong (Kon) (Cameos) (ทองก้อน ทวีวงษ์ (ก้อน) (รับเชิญ))
- 2019 (4 เทพผู้พิทักษ์) (/One 31) as Dr.Chok (หมอโชค)
- 2020 (คนเหนือฅน) (/Ch.7) as Sou Phan (Cameos) (เสือผ่าน (รับเชิญ))
- 2021 Dae Khun Pho Duai Khaeng Kwa (2021) (แด่คุณพ่อด้วยแข้งขวา) (Twin Flame/Thairath TV) as Thianchai (Kroo Thian) (เทียนชัย (ครูเทียน))
- 2021 Talay Duerd (ทะเลเดือด) (/Ch.7) as Thongdee (ทองดี)
- 2021 (เผาขน) (/Ch.7) as Phu Pan (Cameos) (ผู้พัน (รับเชิญ))
- 2021 (เวราอาฆาต) (/Ch.8) as Paen (Cameos) (แผน (รับเชิญ))
- 2022 Mummy Tee Rak (มามี้ที่รัก) (/Ch.3) as Kroo Sou (Cameos) (ครูเสือ (รับเชิญ))
- 2022 Fah Than Tawan (ฟ้า/ทาน/ตะวัน) (CHANGE2561/Amarin TV) as Thom Ya (Thom) (ถมยา (ถม))
- 2022 Chart Payak Khom Nak Laeng (ชาติพยัคฆ์ คมนักเลง) (Coliseum Intergroup/Ch.7) as Phong (พงษ์)
- 2022 Kheha Nang Khoi (เคหาสน์นางคอย) (Mhum Mai/Ch.7) as Boon (Cameos) (บุญ (รับเชิญ))
- 202 (มวยสะดิ้ง หมัดซิ่ง สายฟ้า) (/Ch.8) as ()

=== Television series ===
- 2022 Club Friday The Series : Love Seasons Celebration Ep. Last Happy New Year (Club Friday The Series : Love Seasons Celebration ตอน The Last Happy New Year) (CHANGE2561/One 31) as Kroo Nong (ครูนง (พ่อของเอกภพ))

=== Television Sitcoms ===
- 2022 () (/One 31) as ()

=== Film ===
- 2023 (Once Upon A Star) (มนต์รักนักพากย์) as (Uncle Man)

=== Master of Ceremony: MC ===
==== Television ====
- 20 : ทุกวัน เวลา น. On Air

==== Online ====
- 2021 : - สามารถ VS ฉมวกเพชร กลับมาแก้แค้นแทนเพื่อนรัก On Air YouTube:มอสทะเล Channel

Preceded by Lupe Pintor	WBC Super Bantamweight Champion; 18 Jan 1986– 8 May 1987	Succeeded by Jeff Fenech
