= Chang Jung-koo =

South Korean boxer (born 1963)

Personal information
- Nickname: The Korean Hawk
- Born: Chang Jung-koo; February 4, 1963 (age 63) Busan, South Korea
- Height: 5 ft 3 1/2 in (161 cm)
- Weight: Light flyweight

Boxing career
- Stance: Orthodox

Boxing record
- Total fights: 42
- Wins: 38
- Win by KO: 17
- Losses: 4

Chang Jung-Koo (Korean: 장정구; Hanja: 張正九, born February 4, 1963) is a South Korean former professional boxer who competed from 1980 to 1991. He held the WBC light-flyweight title from 1983 to 1988.

== Professional career ==
Chang took the tough road to becoming a world champion. In Chang's 15th pro fight, he faced former WBA flyweight champion Alfonso Lopez. Chang knocked out Lopez in the 3rd round. Next, Chang faced future IBF flyweight champion Jong-Kwan Chung, stopping Chung in the 6th round. In his 18th fight, and last before challenging for his first world title, Chang scored a 10-round unanimous decision over former WBC light-flyweight champion Amado Ursua.

=== Hilario Zapata Rivalry ===
In Chang's first world title try, he lost to Hilario Zapata of Panama by a 15-round split decision in 1982, by scores of 148–145, 142-144 and 144–147. However, in a rematch held in Seoul, he avenged that loss and became WBC light-flyweight world champion by knocking out Zapata at 2:46 of the 3rd round.

=== World Record Championship ===
Chang then went on to establish a then-world record for the most defenses as world light flyweight champion, defending the title successfully 16 times between 1983 and 1988 when he retired.

In his first defense, he defeated Masaharu Inami and followed it with a win over future champion German Torres.

In 1984, he defeated future champion, Sot Chitalada, former champion Katsuo Tokashiki and Tadashi Kuramochi.

He started 1985 with a narrow majority decision in a rematch with German Torres. The outcome was determined by a single point on one judge's scorecard. Later in the year, he defeated Francisco Montiel and Jorge Cano.

In 1986, Chang faced Torres in a third meeting, this time defeating him by unanimous decision. He followed it with a rematch victory over Francisco Montiel and a knockout over future champion Hideyuki Ohashi.

After securing victories over Efren Pinto and Agustin Garcia in 1987, he faced future champion Isidro Perez. In a hard-fought battle, Perez dropped Chang in the opening round, however, the referee failed to rule it as such. Chang was ultimately awarded a close unanimous decision victory.

After a TKO victory in a rematch over Hideyuki Ohashi in 1988, Chang announced his retirement.

=== Downfall after divorce ===
Originally retired in 1988, Chang Jung-koo's discovered that his first wife was a marriage swindler. From the beginning, the wife married only for Chang Jung-koo's fortune, and after the marriage, she continued to siphon Chang Jung-koo's fortune for her family. When she stole almost all of his assets, she deliberately caused a feud with Chang Jung-koo, and eventually, when she divorced, she ripped off the alimony, turning Chang Jung-koo into a penniless beggar and fled to a foreign country. This is why Chang Jung-koo became financially difficult despite winning 15 championships, which forced him to return to active duty in 1989. However, financial difficulties pushed him back into the ring in 1989 when he challenged and lost to Humberto González, who was the WBC light-flyweight champion at the time.

After moving up to the flyweight division, he challenged WBC flyweight champion Sot Chitalada who he had defeated several years prior. In a closely contested bout, Chang lost a disputed majority decision.

Chitalada then lost that title to Muangchai Kittikasem, prompting Chang to challenge the newly crowned champion. Chang dropped the champion three times, however, Kittikasem rallied back to stop him in the final round. Chang announced his retirement immediately after.

Chang's record for successive title defenses in the 108-pound division would soon be broken by fellow South Korean boxer Yuh Myung-Woo, who successfully defended his WBA light flyweight title 17 times in his first reign between 1985 and 1991.

Chang had a record of 38 wins and 4 losses, with 17 wins by knockout.

In June 2010, Chang and 12 other boxing personalities were inducted in the International Boxing Hall of Fame. He became the first Korean boxer to be inducted in the prestigious boxing hall of fame, and the 5th Asian boxer to receive the honor.

== Professional boxing record ==
42 fights	38 wins	4 losses
By knockout	17	1
By decision	21	3

No.	Result	Record	Opponent	Type	Round, time	Date	Location	Notes
42	Loss	38–4	Muangchai Kittikasem	TKO	12 (12), 2:36	May 18, 1991	Olympic Park Gymnasium, Seoul, South Korea	For WBC flyweight title
41	Loss	38–3	Sot Chitalada	MD	12	Nov 24, 1991	Olympic Park Gymnasium, Seoul, South Korea	For WBC flyweight title
40	Win	38–2	Ric Siodora	TKO	8 (12), 2:58	Sep 15, 1990	Koomi, South Korea	
39	Loss	37–2	Humberto Gonzalez	UD	12	Dec 9, 1989	Indoor Gymnasium, Daegu, South Korea	For WBC light-flyweight title
38	Win	37–1	Amando Velasco	UD	10	Aug 27, 1989	Busan, South Korea	
37	Win	36–1	Hideyuki Ohashi	TKO	8 (12), 1:47	Jun 27, 1988	Korakuen Hall, Japan	Retained WBC light-flyweight title
36	Win	35–1	Isidro Perez	UD	12	Dec 13, 1987	Chungmu Gymnasium, Daejeon, South Korea	Retained WBC light-flyweight title
35	Win	34–1	Agustin Garcia	TKO	10 (12), 1:14	Jun 28, 1987	Chungmu Gymnasium, Daejeon, South Korea	Retained WBC light-flyweight title
34	Win	33–1	Efren Pinto	TKO	6 (12), 0:59	Apr 19, 1987	Chungmu Gymnasium, Daejeon, South Korea	Retained WBC light-flyweight title
33	Win	32–1	Hideyuki Ohashi	TKO	5 (12), 1:55	Dec 14, 1986	Chungmu Gymnasium, Daejeon, South Korea	Retained WBC light-flyweight title
32	Win	31–1	Francisco Montiel	UD	12	Sep 13, 1986	Chungmu Gymnasium, Daejeon, South Korea	Retained WBC light-flyweight title
31	Win	30–1	German Torres	UD	12	Apr 13, 1986	Indoor Arena, Gwangju City, South Korea	Retained WBC light-flyweight title
30	Win	29–1	Jorge Cano	UD	12	Nov 10, 1985	Chungmu Gymnasium, Daejeon, South Korea	Retained WBC light-flyweight title
29	Win	28–1	Francisco Montiel	UD	12	Aug 4, 1985	Munhwa Gymnasium, Seoul, South Korea	Retained WBC light-flyweight title
28	Win	27–1	German Torres	MD	12	Apr 27, 1985	Hyundai Gymnasium, Ulsan, South Korea	Retained WBC light-flyweight title
27	Win	26–1	Tadashi Kuramochi	UD	12	Dec 15, 1984	Gudeok Gymnasium, Busan, South Korea	Retained WBC light-flyweight title
26	Win	25–1	Katsuo Tokashiki	TKO	9 (12), 1:47	Aug 18, 1984	Pohang Gymnasium, Pohang, South Korea	Retained WBC light-flyweight title
25	Win	24–1	Sot Chitalada	UD	12	Mar 31, 1984	Kooduk Gymnasium, Busan, South Korea	Retained WBC light-flyweight title
24	Win	23–1	German Torres	UD	12	Sep 10, 1983	Chungmu Gymnasium, Daejeon, South Korea	Retained WBC light-flyweight title
23	Win	22–1	Masaharu Inami	KO	2 (12), O:58	Jun 11, 1983	Kyungbok Gymnasium, Daegu, South Korea	Retained WBC light-flyweight title
22	Win	21–1	Hilario Zapata	TKO	3 (15), 2:46	Mar 26, 1983	Chungmu Gymnasium, Daejeon, South Korea	Won WBC light-flyweight title
21	Win	20–1	Tio Abella	KO	2 (10), 2:25	Feb 6, 1983	Chungju, South Korea	
20	Win	19–1	Rodrigo Saony	PTS	10	Dec 5, 1982	Jinju, South Korea	
19	Loss	18–1	Hilario Zapata	SD	15	Sep 18, 1982	Jeonju Gymnasium, Jeonju, South Korea	For WBC light-flyweight title
18	Win	18–0	Amado Ursua	UD	10	Jul 10, 1982	Changchung Gymnasium, Seoul, South Korea	
17	Win	17–0	Lukodd Phitiporn	TKO	5 (10), 2:54	Apr 4, 1982	Gudeok Gymnasium, Busan, South Korea	
16	Win	16–0	Jong Kwan Chang	RTD	6 (10), 3:00	Feb 10, 1982	Kyongbuk Gymnasium, Daegu, South Korea	
15	Win	15–0	Alfonso Lopez	KO	3 (8), 2:34	Dec 26, 1981	Jangchung Gymnasium, Seoul, South Korea	
14	Win	14–0	Chutmongkol Thairungriang	KO	2 (10), 0:35	Nov 18, 1981	Kudok Gymnasium, Busan, South Korea	
13	Win	13–0	Leonardo Paredes	KO	6 (10), 2:25	Oct 11, 1981	Chungmu Gymnasium, Daejeon, South Korea	
12	Win	12–0	Lord Esmero	UD	10	Sep 4, 1981	Chungmu Gymnasium, Daejeon, South Korea	
11	Win	11–0	Oscar Bolivar	PTS	10	Jun 7, 1981	Chungmu Gymnasium, Daejeon, South Korea	
10	Win	10–0	Miguel Leal	PTS	10	Apr 25, 1981	Busan, South Korea	
9	Win	9–0	Yo Dong Kim	PTS	6	Mar 29, 1981	Kudok Gymnasium, Busan, South Korea	
8	Win	8–0	Chang Pyo Hong	PTS	8	Jan 23, 1981	Gudeok Gymnasium, Busan, South Korea	
7	Win	7–0	Jin Hyung Park	KO	2 (6), 1:49	Jan 11, 1981	Busan, South Korea	
6	Win	6–0	Nam Keun Kang	PTS	6	Dec 7, 1980	Munhwa Gymnasium, Seoul, South Korea	
5	Win	5–0	Hi Suo Shin	PTS	4	Nov 29, 1980	Munhwa Gymnasium, Seoul, South Korea	
4	Win	4–0	Ho Chul Pyun	PTS	4	Nov 23, 1980	Munhwa Gymnasium, Seoul, South Korea	
3	Win	3–0	Hee Kwan Lee	PTS	4	Nov 22, 1980	Munhwa Gymnasium, Seoul, South Korea	
2	Win	2–0	Jin Hyung Park	TKO	3 (4), 0:56	Nov 19, 1980	Munhwa Gymnasium, Seoul, South Korea	
1	Win	1–0	Jung Yul Suh	KO	3 (4), 1:51	Nov 17, 1980	Munhwa Gymnasium, Seoul, South Korea	

== See also ==
- List of light-flyweight boxing champions
- Sport in South Korea
- Shane Mosley

Achievements
Preceded by Hilario Zapata	WBC light-flyweight champion March 26, 1983 – October 14, 1988; Retired	Vacant Title next held by Germán Torres
