= Sot Chitalada =

Thai boxer (born 1962)

Sot Chitalada สด จิตรลดา
Personal information
- Nationality: Thai
- Born: Chaovalit Wongcharoean; 5 May 1962 (age 64) Saen Suk Subdistrict, Mueang Chonburi district, Chonburi province, Thailand
- Height: 5 ft 4 in (163 cm)
- Weight: Light flyweight; Flyweight

Boxing career
- Reach: 68 in (173 cm)
- Stance: Orthodox

Boxing record
- Total fights: 31
- Wins: 26
- Win by KO: 16
- Losses: 4
- Draws: 1

Sot Chitalada (Thai: สด จิตรลดา, RTGS: Sot Chitlada), born as Chaovalit Wongcharoean (Thai: เชาวลิต วงศ์เจริญ; RTGS: Chaowalit Wongcharoen; 5 May 1962, in Chonburi, Thailand) is a Thai former boxer who was twice WBC and Lineal Flyweight Champion, having defended the title against nine boxers in total.

== Biography and career ==
He is the second child of a Thai-Muslim family with eight children, living in Chonburi near Hat Bang Saen, a popular tourist destination. Before he started Muay Thai, his older brother had already been a fighter. He began training in Muay Thai from childhood to strengthen his naturally weak body.

Chitalada first built his reputation as a Muay Thai fighter under the name Chaovalit Sitphraphrom (Thai: เชาวลิต ศิษย์พระพรหม) before transitioning to professional boxing. He fought many times against Muay Thai legend Samart Payakaroon. After winning his first four professional boxing matches, he challenged the WBC Light Flyweight Champion Jung-Koo Chang on 31 March 1984 but lost by a twelve-round decision.

His ring name, "Sot Chitalada," originated from another boxer in the same stable named "Muns Sorchitpatana" (Thai: มันส์ ส.จิตรพัฒนา; RTGS: Man So-Chitphatthana). When Sorchitpatana lost to former WBC Light Flyweight Champion Netrnoi Sor Vorasingh and was likely to retire, his name was still ranked by the WBC. His manager decided to substitute Chaovalit Sitphraphrom to fight in place of Muns Sorchitpatana. Later, due to a mistake in the WBC rankings, the name Sorchitpatana was replaced by Sot Chitalada, which eventually became his official ring name.

=== World Flyweight Championship ===
Undaunted by the Chang loss, he won two more fights and a little over six months later shocked WBC and Lineal Flyweight Champion Gabriel Bernal, winning the world championships in his home country at Indoor Stadium Huamark, Bangkok.

Chitalada is perhaps best-remembered for his fights with Bernal. The two met again twice in Bangkok. On 22 June 1985, Bernal fought Chitalada to a twelve-round draw, Chitalada keeping the titles. Bernal made another attempt eighteen months later, but on 10 December 1986 he lost another twelve-round decision to Chitalada. This was Bernal's final attempt at the Flyweight titles.

Chitalada brought stability to the WBC and Lineal Flyweight titles, the six title holders prior to Bernal all losing the belts in their first defences, and Bernal losing his second defence. Following the first Bernal fight, Chitalada made six title defences (and won several non-title fights). During this run he defeated former world champion Charlie Magri, Freddy Castillo and Hideaki Kamishiro. He lost the titles on 24 July 1988, travelling to South Korea and losing a twelve-round decision to unbeaten (at that time) Yong-Kang Kim.

After winning three more fights, Chitalada lured Kim for a rematch in his home country of Thailand. This time, it was Chitalada who came out on top, winning a twelve-round decision. Chitalada made four more title defences after he regained the titles. In his third defence, he made his second fight in the Western Hemisphere, defeating Richard Clarke by an eleventh-round knockout in Kingston, Jamaica, thus retaining his titles. For his fourth defence, he travelled to Seoul to avenge the only other loss in his career, to Jung-Koo Chang. Following the Chang fight, on 15 February 1991 Chitalada defended his titles against fellow-countryman Muangchai Kittikasem. This fight ended Chitalada's reign as he suffered his first knockout, Kittikasem stopping him in Round 6 to take the titles. Chitalada won two more fights before challenging Kittikasem to a rematch, but the result was the same, this time it ended in a ninth-round stoppage. That fight would be the last of Chitalada's career, he retired and never attempted a comeback.

=== Post-retirement ===
After retiring from boxing, he studied at the Faculty of Humanities, University of the Thai Chamber of Commerce, becoming the first Thai boxer to earn a bachelor's degree. Before joining Thai Airways, he opened a restaurant called "Krua Sot" (ครัวสด, "fresh kitchen"), but the business was not successful. He later joined Thai Airways' Public Relations Department, though he has since resigned.

He was also active in politics, once serving as a Bangkok Metropolitan Council (BMC) member representing the Khlong Toei district under the Democrat Party.

In his personal life, his wife is an actress known for her roles in traditional-style dramas on Channel 7.

From 2006 to 2007, Chitalada taught Muay Thai at the Muay Thai Institute of Kunponli in Salt Lake City, Utah. He has since moved to teach martial arts in California and in Utah. He then returned to Thailand where he works as a security guard and occasionally teaches Muay Thai at his home.

== Professional boxing record ==
31 fights	26 wins	4 losses
By knockout	16	2
By decision	10	2
Draws	1	

No.	Result	Record	Opponent	Type	Round, time	Date	Location	Notes
31	Loss	26–4–1	Muangchai Kittikasem	TKO	9 (12)	Feb 28, 1992	Crocodile Farm, Samut Prakan, Thailand	For WBC flyweight title
30	Win	26–3–1	Sugar Ray Hynes	UD	10	Oct 5, 1991	Bangkok, Thailand	
29	Win	25–3–1	Jerry Tarona	KO	5 (10)	Aug 28, 1991	Bangkok, Thailand	
28	Win	24–3–1	Chan-Woo Park	KO	6 (10)	Jul 6, 1991	Bangkok, Thailand	
27	Loss	23–3–1	Muangchai Kittikasem	TKO	6 (12)	Feb 15, 1991	Central Stadium, Ayutthaya, Thailand	Lost WBC flyweight title
26	Win	23–2–1	Chang Jung-koo	MD	12	Nov 24, 1990	Olympic Park Gymnasium, Seoul, South Korea	Retained WBC flyweight title
25	Win	22–2–1	Richard Clarke	TKO	11 (12)	Sep 7, 1990	National Arena, Kingston, Jamaica	Retained WBC flyweight title
24	Win	21–2–1	Carlos Gabriel Salazar	UD	12	May 1, 1990	Army Sports Stadium, Bangkok, Thailand	Retained WBC flyweight title
23	Win	20–2–1	Ric Siodora	UD	12	Jan 30, 1990	Lumpinee Boxing Stadium, Bangkok, Thailand	Retained WBC flyweight title
22	Win	19–2–1	Welgie Leonora	PTS	10	Sep 27, 1989	Bangkok, Thailand	
21	Win	18–2–1	Kim Yong-kang	SD	12	Jun 3, 1989	Municipal Stadium, Trang, Thailand	Won WBC flyweight title
20	Win	17–2–1	Boy Selda	KO	6 (10)	Feb 28, 1989	Bangkok, Thailand	
19	Win	16–2–1	Nelson Harada Cabig	KO	9 (10)	Dec 30, 1988	Bangkok, Thailand	
18	Win	15–2–1	Ronnie Belaro	RTD	6 (10)	Nov 9, 1988	Rajadamnern Stadium, Bangkok, Thailand	
17	Loss	14–2–1	Kim Yong-kang	UD	12	Jul 24, 1988	Pohang Indoor Gymnasium, Pohang, South Korea	Lost WBC and The Ring flyweight titles
16	Win	14–1–1	Hideaki Kamishiro	RTD	7 (12)	Jan 31, 1988	Osaka-jō Hall, Osaka, Japan	Retained WBC and The Ring flyweight titles
15	Win	13–1–1	Rae Ki Ahn	KO	4 (12)	Sep 5, 1987	Hua Mark Indoor Stadium, Bangkok, Thailand	Retained WBC and The Ring flyweight titles
14	Win	12–1–1	Gabriel Bernal	UD	12	Dec 10, 1986	Hua Mark Indoor Stadium, Bangkok, Thailand	Retained WBC and The Ring flyweight titles
13	Win	11–1–1	Nakarat Kiatsonthaya	KO	2 (10)	Oct 12, 1986	Bangkok, Thailand	
12	Win	10–1–1	Moon Jin Choi	TKO	9 (10)	Aug 30, 1986	Siam Park, Bangkok, Thailand	
11	Win	9–1–1	Freddy Castillo	UD	12	Feb 22, 1986	El Sabah Al Salem Stadium, Kuwait City, Kuwait	Retained WBC and The Ring flyweight titles
10	Draw	8–1–1	Gabriel Bernal	MD	12	Jun 22, 1985	National Stadium Gymnasium, Bangkok, Thailand	Retained WBC and The Ring flyweight titles
9	Win	8–1	Charlie Magri	RTD	4 (12)	Feb 20, 1985	Alexandra Palace, London, England, U.K.	Retained WBC and The Ring flyweight titles
8	Win	7–1	Gabriel Bernal	SD	12	Oct 8, 1984	National Stadium Gymnasium, Bangkok, Thailand	Won WBC and The Ring flyweight titles
7	Win	6–1	Rudi Palicua	TKO	7 (10)	Jul 6, 1984	Bangkok, Thailand	
6	Win	5–1	Wick Tengam	TKO	6 (10)	May 6, 1984	Bangkok, Thailand	
5	Loss	4–1	Chang Jung-koo	UD	12	Mar 31, 1984	Kooduk Gymnasium, Busan, South Korea	For WBC light flyweight
4	Win	4–0	Chaonainoi Chomcata	KO	2 (6)	Dec 30, 1983	Bangkok, Thailand	
3	Win	3–0	Niponyut Sakadam	KO	3 (6)	Nov 18, 1983	Bangkok, Thailand	
2	Win	2–0	Suriya Patumwadee	PTS	6	Aug 23, 1983	Bangkok, Thailand	
1	Win	1–0	Srithunya Sithsanae	KO	4 (6)	May 5, 1983	Bangkok, Thailand	

== Muay Thai record ==
Muay Thai Record
Date	Result	Opponent	Event	Location	Method	Round	Time
1983-09-28	Win	(Thailand) Phayanoi Sor Thasanee	Rajadamnern Stadium	Bangkok, Thailand	Decision	5	3:00
1983-08-24	Loss	(Thailand) Lankrung Kiatkriangkrai	Rajadamnern Stadium	Bangkok, Thailand	Decision	5	3:00
For the Rajadamnern Stadium Flyweight (112 lbs) title.
1983-08-03	Win	(Thailand) Boonam Sor.Jarunee	Palangnum, Rajadamnern Stadium	Bangkok, Thailand	Decision	5	3:00
1983-06-17	Win	(Thailand) Ruengchai Thairungruang	Rajadamnern Stadium	Bangkok, Thailand	Decision	5	3:00
1983-05-12	Loss	(Thailand) Lankrung Kiatkriangkrai	Rajadamnern Stadium	Bangkok, Thailand	Decision	5	3:00
For the Rajadamnern Stadium Flyweight (112 lbs) title.
1982-10-	Win	(Thailand) Palannoi Kiatanan	Rajadamnern Stadium	Bangkok, Thailand	Decision	5	3:00
1982-08-10	Win	(Thailand) Yoknoi Fairtex	Fairtex, Lumpinee Stadium	Bangkok, Thailand	Decision	5	3:00
1982-04-07	Loss	(Thailand) Sereenoi Kiattisakbandit	Petchyindee, Lumpinee Stadium	Bangkok, Thailand	Decision	5	3:00
1982-01-26	NC	(Thailand) Phonsaknoi Sitchang	Chatuchok, Lumpinee Stadium	Bangkok, Thailand	Chaowalit dismissed	5	
1979-11-02	Loss	(Thailand) Samart Payakaroon	Onesongchai, Lumpinee Stadium	Bangkok, Thailand	Decision	5	3:00
1979-07-24		(Thailand) Wisanupon Saksamut	Lumpinee Stadium	Bangkok, Thailand			
1979-01-01	Loss	(Thailand) Samart Payakaroon		Sa Kaeo Province, Thailand	Decision	5	3:00
Legend: Win Loss Draw/No contest Notes

== See also ==
- Sahasombhop Srisomvongse
- Lineal championship
- List of world flyweight boxing champions

Sporting positions
World boxing titles
Preceded by Gabriel Bernal	WBC flyweight champion October 8, 1984 – July 24, 1988	Succeeded by Kim Yong-kang
Preceded by Gabriel Bernal	The Ring flyweight champion October 8, 1984 – July 24, 1988	Succeeded by Kim Yong-kang
Preceded by Kim Yong-kang	WBC flyweight champion June 3, 1989 – February 15, 1991	Succeeded by Muangchai Kittikasem
