= Muangchai Kittikasem =

Thai boxer (born 1968)

Personal information
- Nicknames: Ai-mud morana (ไอ้หมัดมรณะ) ("Fist of Death"); J-Okay
- Born: Muangchai Jantaweemol (formerly Natawut Jantaweemol); 11 November 1968 (age 58) Tha Chai, Mueang Chainat, Chainat, Thailand
- Height: 5 ft 4 in (163 cm)
- Weight: Light-flyweight; Flyweight

Boxing career
- Stance: Orthodox

Boxing record
- Total fights: 29
- Wins: 25
- Win by KO: 17
- Losses: 4

Nattawut Jantaweemol (Thai: ณัฐวุฒิ จันทรวิมล, born 11 November 1968), later Muangchai Jantaweemol (Thai: เมืองชัย จันทรวิมล), known professionally as Muangchai Kittikasem (Thai: เมืองชัย กิตติเกษม), is a Thai former professional boxer who competed between 1988 and 1999. He is the first Thai to be a world champion in two weight classes, having held the International Boxing Federation (IBF) junior-flyweight world title from 1989 to 1990 and the World Boxing Council (WBC) flyweight world title from 1991 to 1992.

== Muay Thai career ==
His experience with Muay Thai began when he was just a boy. He and his friends had gone to a temple fair held some distance from their hometown, where a small prize was offered: 150 baht for the winner, 100 for the loser. Drawn in by the chance to earn a bit of money, they signed up for the bouts—despite having no training or prior experience.

Amazingly, he managed to defeat an opponent who had already fought around 10 times. He returned home the next morning and handed the 150 baht prize to his mother. When his father heard the story, he began training the boys in an empty space behind their house—even though he himself had no experience or background as a trainer.

Incredibly, when the boy stepped into the ring again, he went on to win nine fights in a row.

Kittikasem reportedly fought in around 100 Muay Thai matches, using a series of ring names — Jinjok Sithphorum (Thai: จิ้งจก ศิษย์พ่ออ่ำ), Jingjok Uvichaiyont (Thai: จิ้งจก อู่วิชัยยนต์), and Muangchai Singnonsuan (Thai: เมืองชัย สิงห์โนนสวน), respectively. His career took him through both rural and Bangkok arenas, though he never secured a championship title.

He changed to boxing when a promoter needed a short-term replacement on one of his cards. In professional boxing, he has had three managers in total: Kitti Akkraseranee, Song Karnchanachoosak and Songchai Rattanasuban.

== Professional boxing career ==
The relentless pressure fighter Kittikasem started to fight professionally in 1988. In only his 7th bout 1989 he won the IBF junior-flyweight world title on points against Filipino Tacy Macalos and defended it against the same fighter by KO. After two defenses, he went to the United States to defend the crown against undefeated amateur star Michael Carbajal in 1990. In the bout, he was knocked down four times by the American and injured his chin during the 7th round. His chin became his major weakness since then.

He went up in weight and won the WBC and lineal flyweight world title by KO in a 6-round fight against his countryman Sot Chitalada the very next year. Kittikasem KOd Jung Koo Chang and stopped Chitalada once again in the rematch.

He lost another title to another amateur world champion, Russian Yuri Arbachakov, in 1992. The fight took place in Japan, and ended in an explosive KO when Kittikasem ran right in a counter. In 1993, he was KO'd one more time by Arbachakov, this time in Thailand.

He had a couple more fights but never contended again.

== Retirement ==
After retiring permanently from boxing, he worked as a used car dealer in Thawi Watthana district, a western suburb of Bangkok, up until the major flood of 2011. He was also active in local politics as a member of the Pheu Thai Party and was considered a close associate of Wan Yubamrung, son of Chalerm Yubamrung. He ran three times for a seat on the Bangkok Metropolitan Council (BMC) in the Bang Bon district, but was unsuccessful each time.

In addition, he had some involvement in the showbiz, appearing in supporting roles in several television dramas and films — such as The Legend of Suriyothai in 2001, Sin Sisters in 2002.

== Personal life ==
He is divorced and has two children. Kittikasem hailed Carbajal as the best opponent he had ever faced.

== Professional boxing record ==
29 fights	25 wins	4 losses
By knockout	17	4
By decision	8	0

No.	Result	Record	Opponent	Type	Round, time	Date	Location	Notes
29	Loss	25–4	Shigeru Nakazato	RTD	4 (10)	22 Feb 1999	Korakuen Hall, Tokyo, Japan	
28	Win	25–3	Joey Boy Gaabon	KO	3 (10)	11 May 1996	Rajawong Pier, Bangkok, Thailand	
27	Win	24–3	Jun Lansaderas	KO	1 (?)	10 Jun 1995	Nakhon Pathom, Thailand	
26	Win	23–3	Rocky Marcial	KO	3 (?)	6 Apr 1995	The Capital City Discotheque, Bangkok, Thailand	
25	Loss	22–3	Yuri Arbachakov	TKO	9 (12), 1:44	20 Mar 1993	Lop Buri Community Park, Lop Buri, Thailand	For WBC flyweight title
24	Win	22–2	Park Chan-woo	TKO	3 (?)	17 Dec 1992	Bangkok, Thailand	
23	Win	21–2	Kim Ki-jung	KO	6 (?)	4 Oct 1992	Bangkok, Thailand	
22	Loss	20–2	Yuri Arbachakov	KO	8 (12), 2:59	23 Jun 1992	Kokugikan, Tokyo, Japan	Lost WBC flyweight title
21	Win	20–1	Tarman Garzim	PTS	10	27 May 1992	Pathum Thani, Thailand	
20	Win	19–1	Eddy Permasugi	PTS	10	4 Apr 1992	Sakon Nakhon, Thailand	
19	Win	18–1	Sot Chitalada	TKO	9 (12), 1:30	28 Feb 1992	Crocodile Farm, Samut Prakan, Thailand	Retained WBC flyweight title
18	Win	17–1	Alberto Jimenez	MD	12	25 Oct 1991	Lumpinee Boxing Stadium, Bangkok, Thailand	Retained WBC flyweight title
17	Win	16–1	Lito Gonzaga	PTS	10	6 Aug 1991	Lumpinee Boxing Stadium, Bangkok, Thailand	
16	Win	15–1	Chang Jung-koo	TKO	12 (12), 2:36	18 May 1991	Olympic Gymnastics Arena, Seoul, South Korea	Retained WBC flyweight title
15	Win	14–1	Sot Chitalada	TKO	6 (12), 1:10	15 Feb 1991	Central Stadium, Ayutthaya, Thailand	Won WBC flyweight title
14	Win	13–1	Welgie Leonora	KO	3 (10)	4 Jan 1991	Bangkok, Thailand	
13	Win	12–1	Vic Galme	KO	1 (10)	25 Sep 1990	Bangkok, Thailand	
12	Loss	11–1	Michael Carbajal	TKO	7 (12), 0:14	29 Jul 1990	Veteran's Memorial Coliseum, Phoenix, Arizona, U.S	Lost IBF junior-flyweight title
11	Win	11–0	Abdi Pohan	UD	12	10 Apr 1990	Lumpinee Boxing Stadium, Bangkok, Thailand	Retained IBF junior-flyweight title
10	Win	10–0	Jeung-Jae Lee	TKO	3 (12), 0:52	19 Jan 1990	Lumpinee Boxing Stadium, Bangkok, Thailand	Retained IBF junior-flyweight title
9	Win	9–0	Ippo Gala	UD	10	28 Nov 1989	Bangkok, Thailand	
8	Win	8–0	Tacy Macalos	TKO	7 (12), 1:56	6 Oct 1989	Lumpinee Boxing Stadium, Bangkok, Thailand	Retained IBF junior-flyweight title
7	Win	7–0	Tacy Macalos	SD	12	2 May 1989	Lumpinee Boxing Stadium, Bangkok, Thailand	Won IBF junior-flyweight title
6	Win	6–0	Nongberd Naphataya	TKO	5 (?)	8 Apr 1989	Samut Sakhon, Thailand	
5	Win	5–0	Eddie Bagunava	KO	4 (?)	3 Feb 1989	Bangkok, Thailand	
4	Win	4–0	Kwanjai Sorpengpit	TKO	5 (?)	27 Dec 1988	Bangkok, Thailand	
3	Win	3–0	Seung Yub Kang	TKO	3 (?)	18 Nov 1988	Lumpinee Boxing Stadium, Bangkok, Thailand	
2	Win	2–0	Hisao Nayuki	KO	1 (10)	6 Sep 1988	Bangkok, Thailand	
1	Win	1–0	Udin Baharudin	PTS	10	10 Jun 1988	Lumpinee Boxing Stadium, Bangkok, Thailand	

== Muay Thai record ==
Muay Thai Record (Incomplete)
Date	Result	Opponent	Event	Location	Method	Round	Time
1988-04-29	Win	(Thailand) Seesod Sahakarnosot		Bangkok, Thailand	KO	2	
1988-04-12	Win	(Thailand) Eddie Sitwatsiripong		Bangkok, Thailand	KO	2	
1988-02-05	Win	(Thailand) Sittichai Monsongkram		Bangkok, Thailand	KO	2	
1988-01-05	Win	(Thailand) Wanthongchai Sitdaothong		Bangkok, Thailand	KO	3	
1987-10-06	Win	(Thailand) Yodsuwan Sityodtong		Bangkok, Thailand	Decision	5	3:00
1987-09-08	Win	(Thailand) Sittichok Monsongkhram		Bangkok, Thailand	KO	3	
1987-07-17	Loss	(Thailand) Kawnar Bualuangprakanphay		Bangkok, Thailand	Decision	5	3:00
1987-05-15	Win	(Thailand) Sittichok Monsongkhram		Bangkok, Thailand	KO	3	
1987-03-21	Loss	(Thailand) Khunpon Sor.Wattana		Bangkok, Thailand	Decision	5	3:00
1987-01-06	Win	(Thailand) Superlek Chor.Sawat		Bangkok, Thailand	KO	2	
Legend: Win Loss Draw/No contest Notes

== Titles in boxing ==
=== Major world titles ===
- IBF light-flyweight champion (108 lbs)
- WBC flyweight champion (112 lbs)

== See also ==
- Lineal championship
- List of world light-flyweight boxing champions
- List of world flyweight boxing champions

Sporting positions
World boxing titles
Preceded by Tacy Macalos	IBF light-flyweight champion 2 May 1989 – 29 Jul 1990	Succeeded by Michael Carbajal
Preceded by Sot Chitalada	WBC flyweight champion 15 Feb 1991 – 23 Jun 1992	Succeeded by Yuri Arbachakov
