= Katsuo Tokashiki =

Japanese boxer

Katsuo Tokashiki 渡嘉敷 勝男
Personal information
- Nickname: Yanbarukuina
- Nationality: Japanese
- Born: July 27, 1960 (age 66) Okinawa, Okinawa, USCAR (nowadays Japan)
- Height: 5 ft 2 in (157 cm)
- Weight: Light flyweight

Boxing career
- Stance: Orthodox

Boxing record
- Total fights: 25
- Wins: 19
- Win by KO: 4
- Losses: 4
- Draws: 2

Katsuo Tokashiki (渡嘉敷 勝男, born July 27, 1960, in Okinawa, Japan) is a Japanese former WBA Light flyweight champion. He currently works as an actor and television persona, and runs his own boxing gym in Tokyo, Japan.

== Childhood & Early career ==
Tokashiki was born in Okinawa, but was raised in Takarazuka, Hyogo. He caused all sorts of trouble from an early age, and was infamous in his local town by the time he reached high school. He dropped out of school to begin training as a professional boxer, and traveled to Tokyo, where he entered the Kyoei boxing gym. The WBA Light flyweight champion Yoko Gushiken also trained at the Kyoei gym during the same period. Tokashiki made his professional debut in December, 1978.

== Professional career ==
Tokashiki was a short (even for a light flyweight) and quick fighter, and quickly emerged as one of Japan's best youngest boxers. He did not mark a KO victory until his 12th professional fight in 1980.

Tokashiki compiled a record of 13-1-1 (2KOs) before challenging Hwan Jin Kim for the WBA Light flyweight title in December, 1981. Yoko Gushiken had lost the WBA title to Pedro Flores, after defending it 13 times. Flores in turn lost his title to Kim and Tokashiki set out to avenge his gymmate's Gushiken's loss of his title. Tokashiki won the world title with by unanimous decision, but a scandal involving the Kyoei gym's management was revealed the same day, and Tokashiki's victory was marred by controversy, since he and the previous champion, Gushiken, both trained with the gym.

Regardless, Tokashiki compiled 5 straight defenses, but lost his title to Lupe Madera, (who he had fought two previous times in defenses) after he was injured in the 4th round. Tokashiki got a rematch in October, 1983, but lost a close unanimous decision in 15 rounds. The WBA would have allowed another rematch, but Tokashiki did not want to fight Madera for a fifth time, and decided to challenge Korean boxer Jung Koo Chang for the WBC Light flyweight title instead.

The match took place in Korea, where Chang was already a national hero. This was the only time Tokashiki fought outside Japan in his career, and he knew he had to win by KO to capture the title. Tokashiki was aggressive from the first round, and pinned the champion against the corner, when he was knocked down for the first time in his career with a counter left hook. However, Tokashiki managed to tire out the champion by the 5th round, and Chang showed fatigue, clinching repeatedly, and slipping in the 8th round. Chang's corner bought time by having to retape the champion's gloves twice during rounds, and in the 9th round, Chang surprised Tokashiki with a sudden flurry of punches. Tokashiki was staggered, and the referee immediately stopped the fight to declare Chang the victory, despite the fact that Tokashiki had remained standing as Chang collapsed to the canvas after hearing that he had won. Chang was only 21 years old at the time, he defended the WBC title 15 times. Tokashiki announced his retirement shortly after this fight. His record was 19-4-2 (4KOs).

== Professional boxing record ==
25 fights	19 wins	4 losses
By knockout	4	1
By decision	15	3
Draws	2	

No.	Result	Record	Opponent	Type	Round, time	Date	Location	Notes
25	Loss	19–4–2	Chang Jung-koo	TKO	9 (12)	1984-08-18	Pohang Gymnasium, Pohang, South Korea	For WBC light flyweight title
24	Win	19–3–2	Takashi Sakakibara	KO	6 (10)	1984-03-08	Korakuen Hall, Tokyo, Japan	
23	Loss	18–3–2	Lupe Madera	UD	15 (15)	1983-10-23	Nakajima Sports Center, Sapporo, Japan	For WBA light flyweight title
22	Loss	18–2–2	Lupe Madera	TD	4 (15)	1983-07-10	Korakuen Hall, Tokyo, Japan	Lost WBA light flyweight title
21	Draw	18–1–2	Lupe Madera	SD	15 (15)	1983-04-10	Korakuen Hall, Tokyo, Japan	Retained WBA light flyweight title
20	Win	18–1–1	Kim Hwan-jin	UD	15 (15)	1983-01-09	Prefectural Gymnasium, Kyoto, Japan	Retained WBA light flyweight title
19	Win	17–1–1	Sung Nam Kim	UD	15 (15)	1982-10-10	Korakuen Hall, Tokyo, Japan	Retained WBA light flyweight title
18	Win	16–1–1	Masaharu Inami	TKO	8 (15)	1982-07-07	Kokugikan, Tokyo, Japan	Retained WBA light flyweight title
17	Win	15–1–1	Lupe Madera	SD	15 (15)	1982-04-04	Miyagi Sports Center, Sendai, Japan	Retained WBA light flyweight title
16	Win	14–1–1	Kim Hwan-jin	UD	15 (15)	1981-12-16	Miyagi Sports Center, Sendai, Japan	Won WBA light flyweight title
15	Win	13–1–1	Toshihiro Okumoto	KO	10 (10)	1981-10-19	Japan	
14	Win	12–1–1	Yong Hyun Kim	PTS	10 (10)	1981-06-02	Korakuen Hall, Tokyo, Japan	
13	Win	11–1–1	Toshihiro Okumoto	PTS	10 (10)	1981-03-08	City Gymnasium, Gushikawa, Japan	
12	Win	10–1–1	Phoenix Taniguchi	KO	9 (10)	1980-11-12	Japan	
11	Win	9–1–1	Manabu Irei	UD	8 (8)	1980-08-30	Yamato, Japan	
10	Loss	8–1–1	Jong Chul Park	PTS	6 (6)	1980-06-14	Aichi Prefectural Gymnasium, Nagoya, Japan	
9	Win	8–0–1	Fujio Ito	PTS	6 (6)	1980-02-21	Prefectural Gymnasium, Osaka, Japan	
8	Win	7–0–1	Masanobu Nakasone	PTS	4 (4)	1979-12-23	Korakuen Hall, Tokyo, Japan	
7	Win	6–0–1	Naojiro Toda	PTS	4 (4)	1979-11-12	Korakuen Hall, Tokyo, Japan	
6	Win	5–0–1	Junichi Ota	PTS	4 (4)	1979-10-13	City Gymnasium, Aizuwakamatsu, Japan	
5	Draw	4–0–1	Katsumi Sato	PTS	4 (4)	1979-07-12	Korakuen Hall, Tokyo, Japan	
4	Win	4–0	Osamu Kiyohara	PTS	4 (4)	1979-06-05	Hachinohe, Japan	
3	Win	3–0	Susumu Kashiwaba	PTS	4 (4)	1979-02-23	Korakuen Hall, Tokyo, Japan	
2	Win	2–0	Kiyoshi Kondo	PTS	4 (4)	1979-01-26	Korakuen Hall, Tokyo, Japan	
1	Win	1–0	Nobuo Hamada	PTS	4 (4)	1978-12-28	Japan	

== Post-retirement ==
Like many other Japanese boxers, Tokashiki became a television persona after retiring from boxing, and has appeared on several variety television shows. He has also worked as an actor, and took the role of boxer Fighting Harada in a television drama series in 1990. His appearances on television have decreased lately, but he created the Tokashiki Boxing Gym in Tokyo, and currently works as a trainer there. He also petitioned the court to order Iwao Hakamada's retrial.

== See also ==
- Boxing in Japan
- List of Japanese boxing world champions
- List of world light-flyweight boxing champions

Sporting positions
World boxing titles
Preceded by Kim Hwan-jin	WBA light flyweight champion December 16, 1981 – July 10, 1983	Succeeded by Lupe Madera
