= Kotera =

Kotera (written: 小寺 lit. "small temple") is a Japanese, Czech, or Indian surname. Notable people with the surname include:

- Hamilton Gary Kotera (born 1984), American basketball player
- Jan Kotěra (1871–1923), Czech architect, artist and interior designer
- Kazuki Kotera (小寺 一生, born 1983), Japanese footballer
- Yuki Kotera (小寺 優輝, born 1986), Japanese footballer
