= Waiākea Volcanic Beverages =

American beverage company in Hawaii

- Industry: Beverage
- Founded: 2012; 14 years ago
- Founder: Ryan Emmons
- Headquarters: Hilo, Hawaii, U.S.
- Website: waiakea.com

Waiākea Volcanic Beverages (simply Waiākea) is an American beverage company headquartered in Hawaii that produces bottled volcanic water and other beverage products. Founded in 2012 by Ryan Emmons, the company markets naturally alkaline water sourced from the eastern slope of Mauna Loa on the island of Hawaii.

== History ==
Waiākea was founded in Hilo, Hawaiʻi by founder and chief executive Ryan Emmons a freshman at the University of Southern California's Marshall School of Business, launching the brand in 2012 after learning that his family had access to an aquifer on Hawaiʻi's Big Island.

The company began distributing bottled volcanic water in the United States, promoting water that is naturally filtered through porous volcanic rock and collected from an aquifer beneath Mauna Loa.

In 2017, Waiākea opened a bottling facility in Hilo, Hawaiʻi. Before the facility's opening, the company shipped its water in bulk to California for bottling, then transitioned bottling operations to Hawaiʻi.

In 2020, Waiākea established a corporate non-profit foundation, the Kōkua Initiative, focused on local education, conservation, and community support in Hawaiʻi. In 2022, Waiākea launched a bagged single-origin Hawaiian coffee described as Rainforest Alliance-recognized and grown using recycled drip irrigation.

In April 2024, Waiakea recalled certain one-liter bottles of Waiakea Hawaiian Volcanic Water Naturally Alkaline Electrolytes Deep Well Water after consumer complaints of floating particles in the product. The recall had been initiated on November 28, 2023, and covered about 3,850 cases distributed to Pennsylvania, Maryland, New Jersey, Michigan, Texas, Florida, North Carolina, Georgia and Colorado. Consumers were advised to discard or return the affected product.

In August 2025, Waiākea became a certified B Corporation, receiving a B Impact Assessment score of 126.6. Certification requires a minimum verified score of 80 on the B Impact Assessment.

== Partnerships ==
In 2022, the company announced an equity partnership with New York Yankees outfielder Aaron Judge, alongside existing relationships with NBA player Klay Thompson and NFL player Myles Garrett. The company named athletes including NFL player Tetairoa McMillan, MLB player Devin Williams and NBA player Jerami Grant among its athlete investors.

In 2025, Waiākea partnered with Honolulu-based streetwear brand In4mation on a limited-release apparel capsule called "Honua," with a portion of proceeds directed toward native tree planting through the Waiākea Kōkua Initiative at a Hawaiʻi Island bird sanctuary.
