= Kim Hwan-jin =

South Korean boxer (born 1955)

Personal information
- Nationality: South Korean
- Born: Hwan Jin Kim; June 22, 1955 (age 71) South Korea
- Height: 5 ft 1 in (155 cm)
- Weight: Light flyweight

Boxing career
- Stance: Orthodox

Boxing record
- Total fights: 26
- Wins: 22
- Win by KO: 8
- Losses: 2
- Draws: 2

Kim Hwan-jin (born June 22, 1955, in South Korea) is a South Korean former professional boxer who competed from 1977 to 1983. He won the World Boxing Association light flyweight title in 1981.

== Professional career ==
Kim turned professional in 1977 and compiled a record of 18-0-2 before facing and defeating Mexican boxer Pedro Flores, to win the WBA Light flyweight title. He would defend the title against former flyweight champion Alfonso López in his next fight He would lose go on to lose the title to Japanese contender Katsuo Tokashiki, he retired shortly after the fight.

== Professional boxing record ==
26 fights	22 wins	2 losses
By knockout	8	0
By decision	14	2
Draws	2	

No.	Result	Record	Opponent	Type	Round, time	Date	Location	Notes
26	Loss	22–2–2	Katsuo Tokashiki	UD	15 (15)	1983-01-09	Prefectural Gymnasium, Kyoto	For WBA light flyweight title
25	Win	22–1–2	Alfredo Guanzon	PTS	10 (10)	1982-11-07	Masan, South Korea	
24	Win	21–1–2	Yong Hyun Kim	TD	7 (10)	1982-07-24	Munhwa Gymnasium, Seoul, South Korea	
23	Loss	20–1–2	Katsuo Tokashiki	UD	15 (15)	1981-12-16	Miyagi Sports Center, Sendai, Miyagi, Japan	Lost WBA light flyweight title
22	Win	20–0–2	Alfonso López	MD	15 (15)	1981-10-11	Chungmu Gymnasium, Daejeon, South Korea	Retained WBA light flyweight title
21	Win	19–0–2	Pedro Flores	TKO	13 (15)	1981-07-19	Kyongbuk Gymnasium, Daegu, South Korea	Won WBA light flyweight title
20	Win	18–0–2	Oscar Bolivar	PTS	10 (10)	1981-05-17	Daegu, South Korea	
19	Win	17–0–2	Ben Dayodan	KO	2 (10)	1981-01-11	Daegu, South Korea	
18	Win	16–0–2	Teo Montejo	PTS	10 (10)	1980-08-30	Munhwa Gymnasium, Seoul, South Korea	
17	Win	15–0–2	Mannaseh Base	PTS	10 (10)	1980-07-19	Gudeok Gymnasium, Busan, South Korea	
16	Win	14–0–2	Baldai Edward	KO	6 (10)	1980-06-01	Busan, South Korea	
15	Win	13–0–2	Mannaseh Base	PTS	10 (10)	1980-04-12	Seoul, South Korea	
14	Win	12–0–2	Grumman Ueda	KO	6 (10)	1980-03-02	Seoul, South Korea	
13	Win	11–0–2	Mario Gatica	PTS	10 (10)	1979-11-24	Gyeongbuk Gymnasium, Daegu, South Korea	
12	Win	10–0–2	Ben Aldeguer	KO	10 (10)	1979-09-20	Busan, South Korea	
11	Win	9–0–2	Peter Siscon	PTS	10 (10)	1979-03-25	Ulsan, South Korea	
10	Draw	8–0–2	Chi Bok Kim	PTS	10 (10)	1979-02-04	Busan, South Korea	
9	Win	8–0–1	Tito Abella	PTS	10 (10)	1978-11-30	Munhwa Gymnasium, Seoul, South Korea	
8	Win	7–0–1	Shigeo Nakajima	PTS	10 (10)	1978-08-29	Japan	
7	Win	6–0–1	Jin Tak Kim	KO	7 (8)	1978-01-29	Munhwa Gymnasium, Seoul, South Korea	
6	Win	5–0–1	Kyung Sun Kim	KO	6 (8)	1977-11-26	Gudeok Gymnasium, Busan, South Korea	
5	Win	4–0–1	Seung Hoon Lee	PTS	6 (6)	1977-11-06	Munhwa Gymnasium, Seoul, South Korea	
4	Win	3–0–1	Suk Dong Kim	PTS	8 (8)	1977-10-01	Busan, South Korea	
3	Win	2–0–1	Chung Woon Moon	KO	5 (6)	1977-09-10	Munhwa Gymnasium, Seoul, South Korea	
2	Draw	1–0–1	Jong Keun Kim	PTS	4 (4)	1977-07-09	Gudeok Gymnasium, Busan, South Korea	
1	Win	1–0	Jin Sun Lim	PTS	4 (4)	1977-06-17	Seoul, South Korea	

== See also ==
- List of Korean boxers
- List of world light-flyweight boxing champions

Sporting positions
World boxing titles
Preceded by Pedro Flores	WBA light flyweight champion July 19, 1981 – December 16, 1981	Succeeded by Katsuo Tokashiki
