= Dušan Ristić =

Serbian basketball player

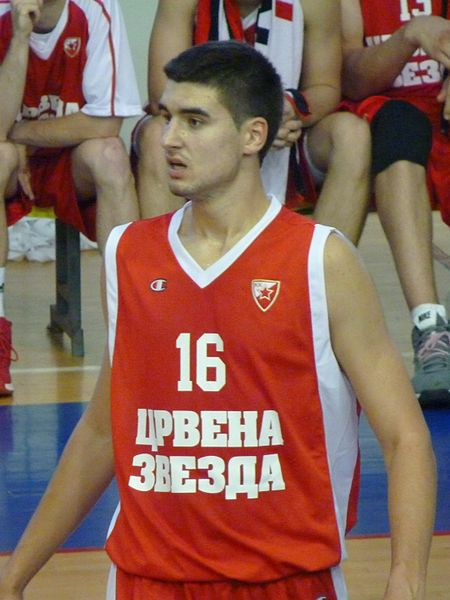
- Ristić with Crvena zvezda in September 2013

Fukui Blowinds
- Position: Center
- League: B.League

Personal information
- Born: 27 November 1995 (age 30) Novi Sad, FR Yugoslavia
- Listed height: 2.13 m (7 ft 0 in)
- Listed weight: 112 kg (247 lb)

Career information
- High school: Sunrise Christian Academy (Bel Aire, Kansas)
- College: Arizona (2014–2018)
- NBA draft: 2018: undrafted
- Playing career: 2012–present

Career history
- 2012–2013: Radnički FMP
- 2013: Crvena zvezda
- 2018–2021: Crvena zvezda
- 2019–2020: →Astana (loan)
- 2020–2021: Brescia
- 2021: Avtodor
- 2021–2022: Fuenlabrada
- 2022–2023: Galatasaray Nef
- 2023–2024: Lenovo Tenerife
- 2024: →San Pablo Burgos (loan)
- 2024–2025: Élan Chalon
- 2025–2026: Kawasaki Brave Thunders
- 2026–present: Fukui Blowinds

Career highlights
- Kazakhstan National League champion (2020); Adriatic League champion (2019); Serbian League champion (2019); Adriatic Supercup winner (2018); Second-team All-Pac-12 (2018)
Medals
Men's basketball
Representing Serbia
FIBA World Cup
Silver medal – second place	2023 Philippines–Japan–Indonesia
U18 European Championship
Bronze medal – third place	2012 Lithuania/Latvia	Team

Dušan Ristić (Serbian Cyrillic: Душан Ристић; born November 27, 1995) is a Serbian professional basketball player for the Fukui Blowinds of the B.League. He played college basketball for the Arizona Wildcats. Ristić represents the Serbia national team and was a member of the team that won the silver medal at the 2023 FIBA Basketball World Cup.

== Early career ==
Dušan grew up with Crvena zvezda youth team. Ristić made his debut with Zvezda second team Radnički FMP during the 2012–13 season.

Ristić made his debut with the first team of Crvena zvezda during the 2013–14 ABA League season. He also played two games in the Euroleague. However, he decided not to sign professional contract with club.

In January 2014, he went to Sunrise Christian Academy in Bel Aire, Kansas.

== College career ==
On 8 March 2014 Ristić committed to play basketball for the Arizona Wildcats. On Twitter, he announced that he will play his senior year for the Wildcats and finish his education. During his senior season, he was a teammate with future NBA draft first overall pick Deandre Ayton, where Ristić was the starting center that year, while Ayton played as the starting power forward that year. He became the all-time winningest player in program history with 115 victories, surpassing Matt Muehlebach (1988–91) and Kaleb Tarczewski (2013–16) at 110 win. His senior year, Ristic was a second-team All-Pac-12 selection, and a member of the Pac-12 all-tournament team. He also became 28th Wildcat in Arizona history to score 1,000 points and grab 500 rebounds in a career.

=== College statistics ===
Year	Team	GP	GS	MPG	FG%	3P%	FT%	RPG	APG	SPG	BPG	PPG
2014–15	Arizona	36	0	8.6	.615	.800	.512	2.1	.5	.5	.25	3.4
2015–16	Arizona	34	9	16.5	.550	.375	.634	3.8	.8	.1	.7	7.1
2016–17	Arizona	36	34	22.8	.556	.500	.765	5.5	.4	.3	.4	10.9
2017–18	Arizona	35	35	27.1	.569	.400	.790	6.9	.9	.4	.5	12.2
Career		141	78	18.7	.565	.467	.698	4.6	.5	.3	.5	8.4

== Professional career ==
After going undrafted in the 2018 NBA draft, Ristić was originally named a member of the 2018 NBA Summer League Phoenix Suns, being reunited with Ayton in the process, but he later backed out on his decision there.

On 16 July 2018 Ristić signed a three-year deal with Crvena zvezda. In July 2019, Ristić was loaned out to Astana of the Kazakhstan Championship and the VTB United League for the 2019–20 season. In July 2020, he returned to the Zvezda after his one-year loan. In July 2020, Ristić was loaned to Brescia Leonessa for the 2020–21 season. In January 2021, he was transferred from Brescia to Avtodor Saratov of the VTB United League for the rest of the 2020–21 season.

=== Urbas Fuenlabrada ===
In June 2021, Ristić signed for Urbas Fuenlabrada of the Liga ACB.

=== Galatasaray Nef ===
On 28 December 2022 he signed with Galatasaray Nef of the Turkish Basketball Super League.

=== Lenovo Tenerife ===
On 23 June 2023 he signed with Lenovo Tenerife of the Liga ACB.

=== Élan Chalon ===
On July 23, 2024, he signed with Élan Chalon of the LNB Pro A.

=== Kawasaki Brave Thunders ===
On June 9, 2025, he signed with Kawasaki Brave Thunders of the B.League.

=== Fukui Blowinds (2026–present) ===
On July 13, 2026, Ristić signed with the Fukui Blowinds for the 2026–27 B.League season.

== National team career ==
Ristić made his official debut for the Serbian senior national team on November 25, 2021, against Latvia in Belgrade during the 2023 FIBA Basketball World Cup European qualifiers. He scored nine points in 15 minutes in Serbia's 101–100 victory.

Ristić became a regular member of the Serbian squad during the World Cup qualifying campaign, appearing in ten qualifying games and averaging 10.0 points and 5.1 rebounds per game. On November 11, 2022, he recorded 15 points and 11 rebounds against Great Britain. Three days later, he scored 16 points in 18 minutes in Serbia's 77–76 victory over Turkey in Belgrade, making all four of his three-point attempts.

On February 27, 2023, Ristić recorded nine points and six rebounds as Serbia defeated Great Britain 101–83 in Belgrade in the final game of the qualifying campaign, securing Serbia's qualification for the 2023 FIBA Basketball World Cup.

Ristić was selected for Serbia's squad at the 2023 FIBA Basketball World Cup. He scored 13 points and collected six rebounds in Serbia's opening victory over China. Ristić appeared in five games during the tournament, averaging 5.4 points and 3.0 rebounds per game. Serbia reached the final and finished as runners-up, earning Ristić a World Cup silver medal.

Ristić continued to represent Serbia following the World Cup, including during qualification for EuroBasket 2025 and the 2027 FIBA Basketball World Cup European qualifiers.

On November 27, 2025, his 30th birthday, Ristić captained Serbia against Switzerland in Belgrade in Serbia's opening game of the 2027 World Cup qualifying campaign. He scored 24 points and grabbed five rebounds while shooting 10-for-10 from the field, including 4-for-4 from three-point range, as Serbia overcame a 23-point halftime deficit to win 90–86.

== Personal life ==
Ristić earned his bachelor's degree in psychology and sport management from the University of Arizona in 2018.
