= Daniel Dantas =

Daniel Dantas may refer to:

- Daniel Dantas (actor) (born 1954), Brazilian actor
- Daniel Dantas (entrepreneur), Brazilian entrepreneur
