= Luiz Gushiken =

Brazilian union leader and politician

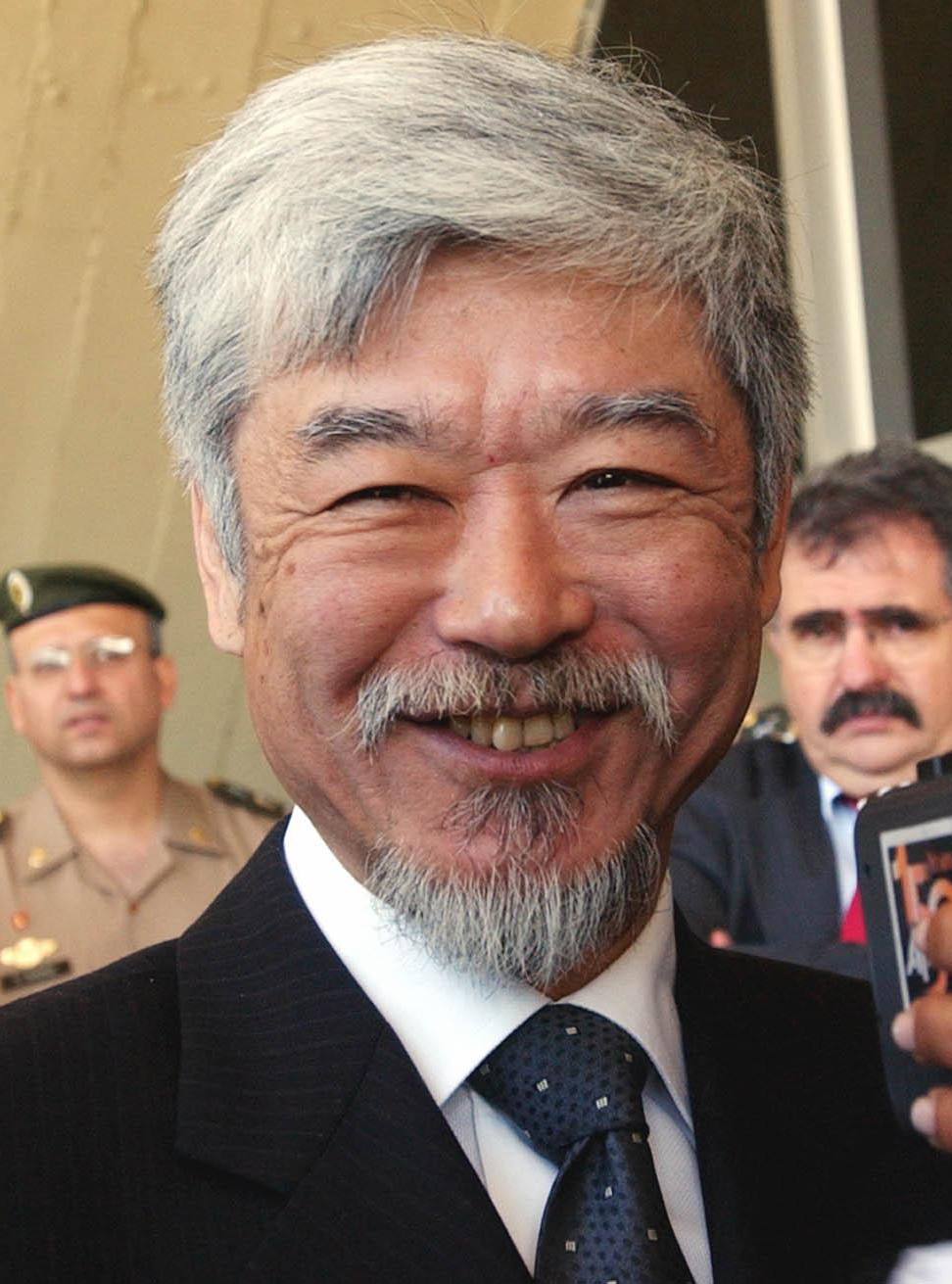
- Luiz Gushiken in 2004

Minister of Social Communication and Strategic Management
- In office 1 January 2003 – 22 July 2005
- President: Luiz Inácio Lula da Silva
- Preceded by: Bob Vieira da Costa
- Succeeded by: Luiz Tadeu Rigo

Workers' Party National President
- In office 11 December 1988 – 15 July 1990
- Preceded by: Olívio Dutra
- Succeeded by: Luiz Inácio Lula da Silva

Federal Deputy for São Paulo
- In office 1 February 1987 – 1 February 1999

Personal details
- Born: 8 May 1950 Osvaldo Cruz, São Paulo, Brazil
- Died: 13 September 2013 (aged 63) São Paulo, Brazil
- Party: PT (1980–2013)
- Spouse: Elizabeth Gushiken
- Education: Getulio Vargas Foundation
- Profession: Politician, activist

Luiz Gushiken (8 May 1950 – 13 September 2013) was a Brazilian union leader and politician. He was formerly the head of the social communication office of Luiz Inácio Lula da Silva's administration, a position which carried a ministerial rank. He was a second-generation Ryukyuan-Brazilian, with Ryukyuan parents from Okinawa.

In his youth he was a supporter of O Trabalho, a party linked to the French Organisation Communiste Internationaliste (OCI). He broke with this international current to work closely with Lula in the PT. He worked at Banespa bank and was associated with unions. He was elected a federal deputy in the Congress three times, from 1987 to 1998, and was the coordinator of the presidential campaigns for Lula in 1989 and 1998.

== Early life ==
Luiz Gushiken was born in the small town of Osvaldo Cruz (in Presidente Prudente) and was the first-born son of seven children of the photographer and violinist Shoei and Setsu Gushiken, Ryukyuan immigrants from Okinawa. While he was still a young man, he moved to the city of São Paulo. He lived in the Brás suburb of the city and began to work as a bank clerk at the São Paulo State Bank (Banespa), where he stayed until 1999.

== Political career and involvement ==
He began his political life as a union leader and participated intensely in the strikes of the 1980s during the military dictatorship. He presided over the São Paulo Banker's Union from 1984 to 1986. He was arrested four times by the military regime's Department for Political and Social Order (Departamento de Ordem Política e Social or DOPS). He was also one of the founders of the Brazilian Workers' Party (PT) and the Unified Worker's Centre (CUT), in addition to being one of its leaders (he was the Workers' party's National President from 1988 to 1990).

He was a member (deputado federal) of the Câmara dos Deputados do Brasil for three consecutive parliamentary terms (including in the Brazilian Constituent Assembly (1988)) from 1987 until 1999, and presidential campaign coordinator for Lula in 1989 and 1998. He was also the head of the Secretaria de Comunicação Social (SeCom), part of the Presidency of Brazil.

In 2005, Gushiken was accused - and defended himself - in ongoing lawsuits at the Court of Accounts of the Union (Tribunal de Contas da União, TCU) and at the Supreme Federal Court (Supremo Tribunal Federal, STF). He left SeCom and lost the rank of minister, assuming the position as Chief of the Center for Strategic Affairs (Núcleo de Assuntos Estratégicos, NAE). He permanently left the government in 2006, shortly after Lula's reelection.

As a union leader, he defended pension funds against the losses caused by the agreement with Daniel Dantas' Opportunity Asset Management (Banco Opportunity). Gushiken distinguished himself in his defense of PREVI (Caixa de Previdência dos Funcionários do Banco do Brasil, the pension fund for workers of Banco do Brasil) during the privatizations promoted by the Fernando Henrique Cardoso administration, when the fund was used to incorporate consortiums of foreign corporations in auctions of the iron and steel, electric and telephone service sectors.

He was the target of relentless media campaigns, suffering frequent accusations - none of which were ever proven - related to the use of SeCom funds. Out of office, his house came under malicious attacks and came to be wrongly included in the AP 470 (the Mensalão Scandal criminal lawsuit) by the attorney General Antonio Fernando de Souza - who would come to win a Brasil Telecom mega contract, controlled by Daniel Dantas and which entered into the creation of Oi-Telemar.

== Mensalão scandal and acquittal ==
Gushiken was accused of being part of a cash-for-votes scandal, known as the Mensalão Scandal, after which he was demoted and left the government soon thereafter. Later he was acquitted from all accusations in the AP 470 criminal lawsuit, in a verdict from the Supreme Federal Court decided in 2012, due to lack of evidence from his role in the scandal. José Dirceu later commented that Gushiken's indictment was "one of the great injustices of the [Mensalão scandal]" and "with no regard for the presumption of innocence". Notwithstanding, the press was no less brutal in its remorseless campaign against all of those who were indicted in the scandal, with no formal apology being made for the rash and misguided conclusions of reporters.

== Death ==
Gushiken died on 13 September 2013, at the age of 63 whilst admitted to Hospital Sírio-Libanês in critical condition, due to gastric cancer from which he had suffered since 2002. During treatment of his illness, Gushiken spent most of his time in his Indaiatuba country house (or chácara), in upstate São Paulo. He would only leave his country retreat every two weeks to receive chemotherapy treatment.

A former Buddhist, Rosicrucian and Umbandist, he also adhered to Cabala and Zen Buddhist beliefs, even maintaining close contact with the Baháʼí Faith throughout his life (of which members of his family have been followers for many years). Prior to his death, he formally declared himself a Baháʼí, and his body was buried in a Baháʼí funeral at Redentor Cemetery in São Paulo on 14 September 2013.

== See also ==
- Gushiken

Political offices
| Preceded by Bob Vieira da Costa | Minister of Social Communication and Strategic Management; 2003–2005 | Succeeded by Luiz Tadeu Rigo |
Party political offices
| Preceded by Olívio Dutra | Workers' Party National President; 1988–1990 | Succeeded by Luiz Inácio Lula da Silva |
