= Jaime Rios (boxer) =

Panamanian boxer (1953–2019)

Personal information
- Nickname: El Cieguito (The Blindy)
- Born: Jaime Rios Angulo; August 14, 1953 Panama City, Panama
- Died: March 20, 2019 (aged 65) Panama
- Height: 5 ft 1 in (155 cm)
- Weight: Light flyweight; Flyweight

Boxing career
- Stance: Orthodox

Boxing record
- Total fights: 28
- Wins: 22
- Win by KO: 10
- Losses: 5
- Draws: 1

Jaime Rios (August 14, 1953 – March 20, 2019) was a Panamanian former professional boxer from 1973 to 1992.

== Professional career ==
Rios turned professional in 1973 and compiled a record of 15–1–1 before winning the inaugural WBA light-flyweight title by beating Venezuelan Rigoberto Marcano. He would defend the title once against Japanese contender Kazunori Tenryu, before losing it to Juan Guzman of the Dominican Republic.

== Professional boxing record ==
28 fights	22 wins	5 losses
By knockout	10	1
By decision	12	4
Draws	1	

No.	Result	Record	Opponent	Type	Round, time	Date	Location	Notes
28	Loss	22–5–1	Jaime Diaz	UD	8	Oct 31, 1992	Gimnasio Nuevo Panama, Panama City, Panama	
27	Win	22–4–1	Andres Sanchez	PTS	10	Aug 15, 1992	Arena Panama Al Brown, Colón, Panama	
26	Loss	21–4–1	Yoko Gushiken	KO	13 (15)	May 7, 1978	Prefectural Gymnasium, Hiroshima, Japan	For WBA light flyweight title
25	Win	21–3–1	Humberto Mayorga	KO	9 (10)	Jan 28, 1978	Arena de Colon, Colón, Panama	
24	Win	20–3–1	Alfredo Thomas	TKO	4 (10)	Oct 29, 1977	Gimnasio Nuevo Panama, Panama City, Panama	
23	Win	19–3–1	Calixto Perez	UD	10	Aug 6, 1977	Gimnasio Nuevo Panama, Panama City, Panama	
22	Loss	18–3–1	Yoko Gushiken	SD	15	Jan 30, 1977	Nippon Budokan, Tokyo, Japan	For WBA light flyweight title
21	Loss	18–2–1	Juan Guzman	SD	15	Jul 2, 1976	Santo Domingo, Dominican Republic	Lost WBA light flyweight title
20	Win	18–1–1	Lupe Madera	PTS	10	May 15, 1976	Parque Carta Clara, Mérida, Mexico	
19	Win	17–1–1	Kazunori Tenryu	SD	15	Jan 3, 1976	Prefectural Gymnasium, Kagoshima, Japan	Retained WBA light flyweight title
18	Win	16–1–1	Rigoberto Marcano	UD	15	Aug 23, 1975	Gimnasio Nuevo Panama, Panama City, Panama	Won inaugural WBA light flyweight title
17	Win	15–1–1	Juan Disla	TKO	5 (10)	Jul 26, 1975	Gimnasio Nuevo Panama, Panama City, Panama	
16	Win	14–1–1	Kazunori Tenryu	TKO	4 (12)	May 17, 1975	Gimnasio Nuevo Panama, Panama City, Panama	
15	Win	13–1–1	Orlando Tejedor	TKO	3 (10)	Mar 8, 1975	Gimnasio Nuevo Panama, Panama City, Panama	
14	Win	12–1–1	Dagoberto Perinan	TKO	6 (10)	Feb 1, 1975	Gimnasio Nuevo Panama, Panama City, Panama	
13	Win	11–1–1	Orlando Hernandez	PTS	10	Nov 16, 1974	Gimnasio Nuevo Panama, Panama City, Panama	
12	Draw	10–1–1	Carlos Osorio	PTS	10	Sep 27, 1974	Guayaquil, Ecuador	
11	Loss	10–1	Enrique Torres	UD	12	Aug 31, 1974	Gimnasio Nuevo Panama, Panama City, Panama	For vacant Panamanian flyweight title
10	Win	10–0	Andres Reyes	TKO	7 (10)	Jul 20, 1974	Gimnasio Nuevo Panama, Panama City, Panama	
9	Win	9–0	Manuel Castanedas	UD	10	Jun 29, 1974	Gimnasio Nuevo Panama, Panama City, Panama	
8	Win	8–0	Rene Herrera	TKO	4 (10)	Jun 14, 1974	Gimnasio Neco de la Guardia, Panama City, Panama	
7	Win	7–0	Orlando Quijada	PTS	8	May 4, 1974	Gimnasio Neco de la Guardia, Panama City, Panama	
6	Win	6–0	Luis Cortez	UD	8	Feb 16, 1974	Gimnasio Nuevo Panama, Panama City, Panama	
5	Win	5–0	Jose Jimenez	PTS	8	Dec 15, 1973	Gimnasio Nuevo Panama, Panama City, Panama	
4	Win	4–0	Charolito Mendez	UD	4	Oct 27, 1973	Gimnasio Neco de la Guardia, Panama City, Panama	
3	Win	3–0	Dionisio Palma	KO	3 (6)	Oct 6, 1973	Gimnasio Neco de la Guardia, Panama City, Panama	
2	Win	2–0	Orlando Quijada	MD	4	Sep 1, 1973	Gimnasio Neco de la Guardia, Panama City, Panama	
1	Win	1–0	Ramon Montenegro	TKO	2 (4)	Jul 28, 1973	Gimnasio Neco de la Guardia, Panama City, Panama	

== Death ==
Rios died in March 2019 at the age of 65.

== See also ==
- List of world light-flyweight boxing champions

Sporting positions
World boxing titles
Inaugural champion	WBA light-flyweight champion August 23, 1975 – July 2, 1976	Succeeded by Juan Guzman
