= Tsutomu Isa =

Japanese basketball player and coach

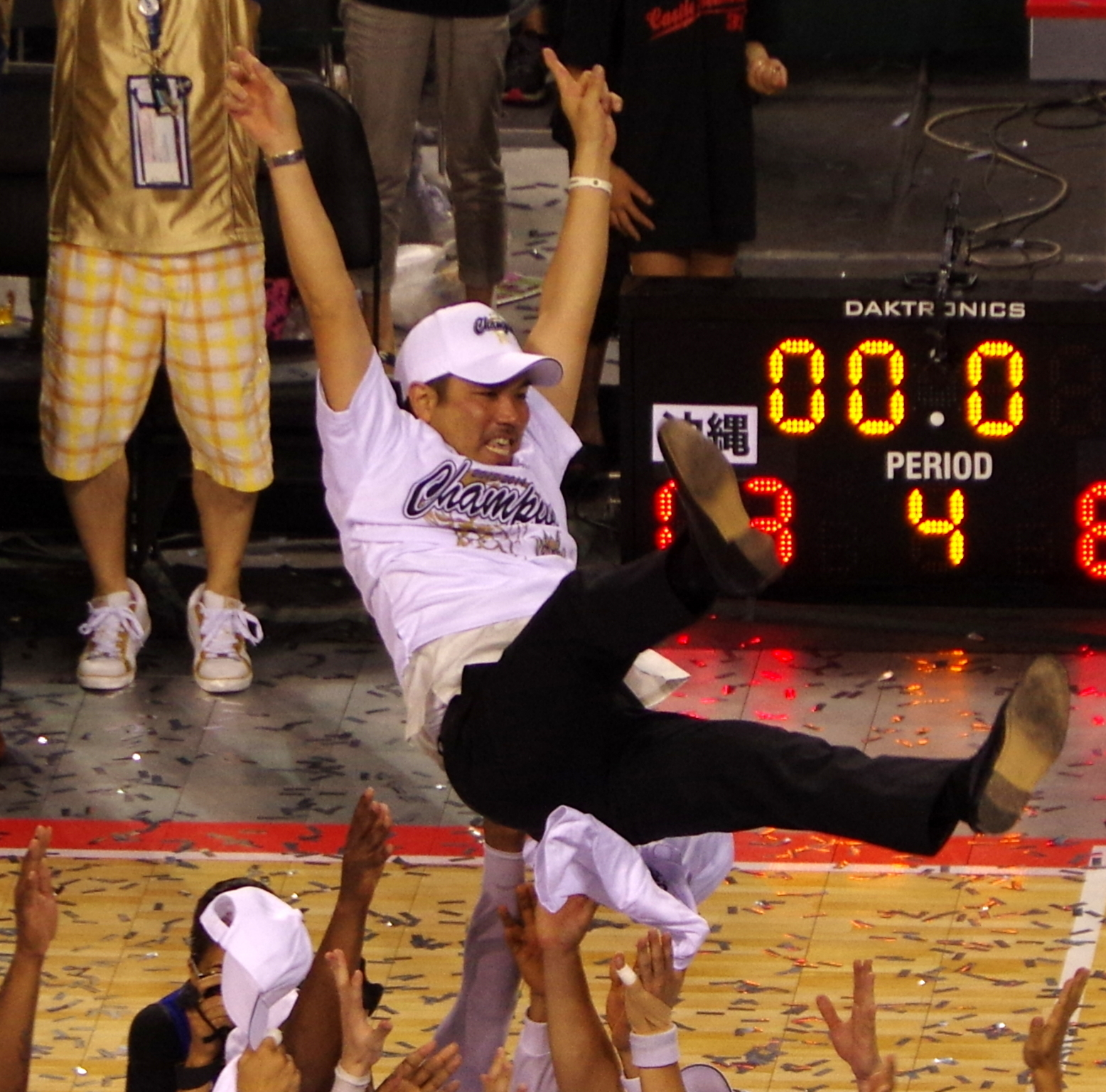

Kyoto Hannaryz
- Position: Head coach
- League: B.League

Personal information
- Born: November 2, 1969 (age 57) Ginowan, Okinawa

Career information
- High school: Kōnan (Naha, Okinawa)
- College: Senshu University
- Playing career: 1990–2007

Career history

Playing
- 1990-2007: Rekiosu Basket

Coaching
- 2007–2013: Ryukyu Golden Kings (asst)
- 2013–2017: Ryukyu Golden Kings
- 2017–2018: Sun Rockers Shibuya (asst)
- 2018–2022: Sun Rockers Shibuya
- 2023–2025: Fukui Blowinds
- 2025–present: Kyoto Hannaryz

Career highlights
- 2x bj league champion

Tsutomu Isa (伊佐勉, Isa Tsutomu), nicknamed Mu-san, is a Japanese basketball coach who is the head coach of the Kyoto Hannaryz of the B.League.

== Head coaching record ==
Legend
Regular season	G	Games coached	W	Games won	L	Games lost	W–L %	Win–loss %
Playoffs	PG	Playoff games	PW	Playoff wins	PL	Playoff losses	PW–L %	Playoff win–loss %

Team	Year	G	W	L	W–L%	Finish	PG	PW	PL	PW–L%	Result
Ryukyu Golden Kings	2013-14	52	43	9	.827	1st in Western	4	4	0	1.000	Bj Champions
Ryukyu Golden Kings	2014-15	52	42	10	.808	2nd in Western	5	2	3	.400	Lost in 2nd round
Ryukyu Golden Kings	2015-16	52	40	12	.769	2nd in Western	6	6	0	1.000	Bj Champions
Ryukyu Golden Kings	2016-17	60	29	31	.483	2nd in Western	2	0	2	.000	Lost in 1st round
Sun Rockers Shibuya	2018-19	52	26	26	.500	4th in Eastern	-	-	-	–	-
Sun Rockers Shibuya	2019-20	41	27	14	.659	4th in Eastern	-	-	-	–	-
