= Hamilton Gary Kotera =

American basketball player

Fukui Blowinds
- Position: Center
- League: B.League

Personal information
- Born: August 7, 1984 (age 42) Los Angeles, California, U.S.
- Listed height: 6 ft 10 in (2.08 m)
- Listed weight: 287 lb (130 kg)

Career information
- High school: Susan Miller Dorsey (Los Angeles, California)
- College: Miami (Florida) (2002–2006)
- NBA draft: 2006: undrafted
- Playing career: 2006–present

Career history
- 2006: Hollywood Fame
- 2007: Los Angeles D-Fenders
- 2007: AZS Koszalin
- 2007–2008: TV 1860 Lich
- 2008–2009: Medi Bayreuth
- 2009–2011: Shiga Lakestars
- 2011–2012: Rizing Fukuoka
- 2012–2013: Defensor Sporting
- 2013: Cader Montevideo
- 2013–2014: SKP Banska Bystrica
- 2014–2015: Osaka Evessa
- 2015–2016: Club Atlético Bohemios
- 2016: Gunma Crane Thunders
- 2016: Passlab Yamagata Wyverns
- 2017–2019: Bambitious Nara
- 2019–2020: Saga Ballooners
- 2021: Ibaraki Robots
- 2021–2022: Ryukyu Golden Kings
- 2022–2023: Sendai 89ers
- 2023–2024: Koshigaya Alphas
- 2024–present: Fukui Blowinds

Career highlights
- 2× bj League Rebound Leaders (2010, 2011); B2 Assist leader (2019)

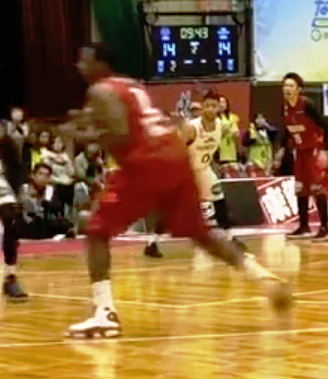

Hamilton Gary Kotera (born August 7, 1984) is a Japanese professional basketball player for Fukui Blowinds of the B.League. He played college basketball for the Miami Hurricanes.

On October 4, 2024, Kotera signed with Fukui Blowinds of the B.League.
