= Chris Holm =

American basketball player

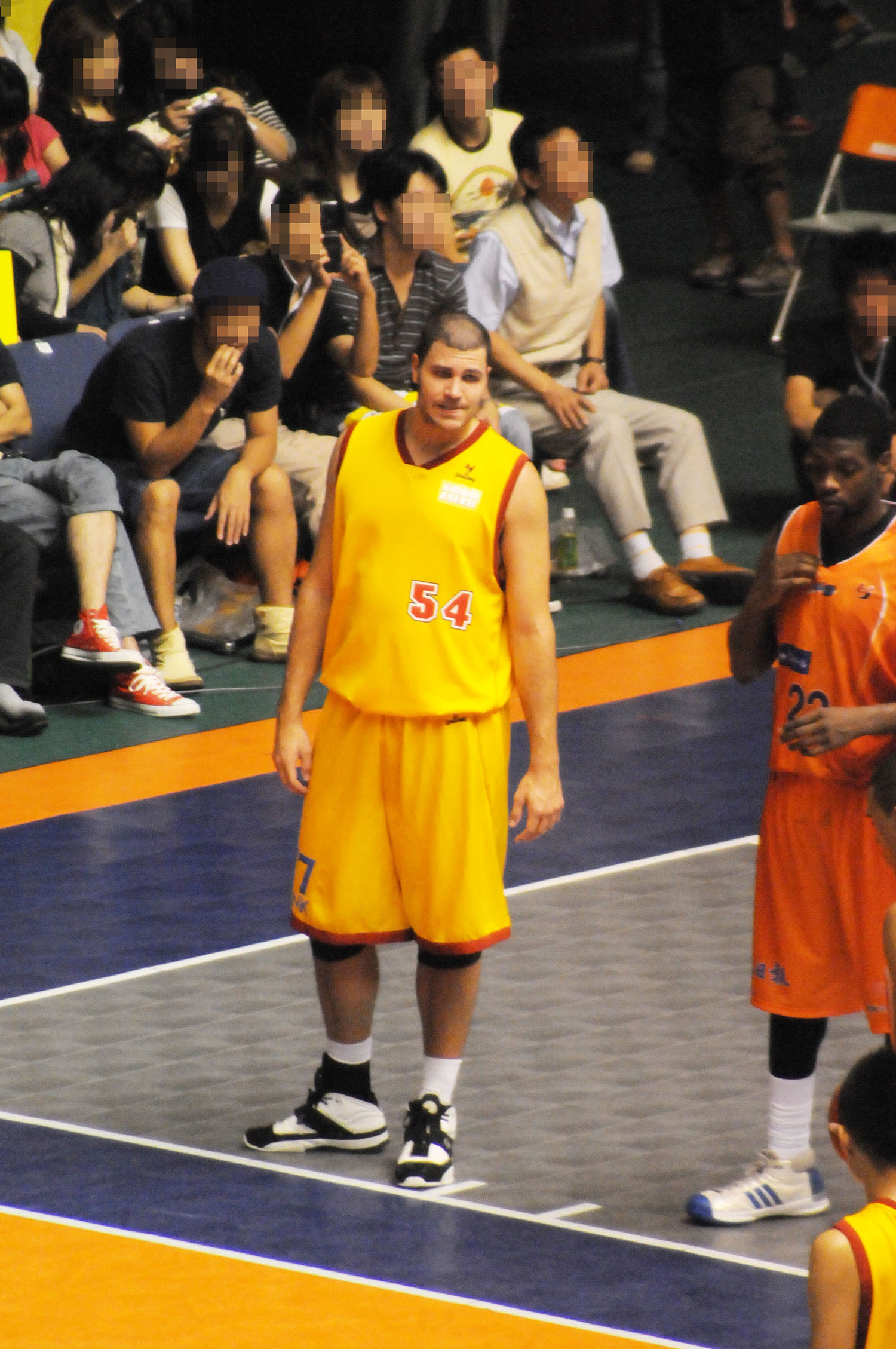
- Holm with Sendai 89ers

Kyoto Hannaryz
- Position: Assistant coach
- League: B.League

Personal information
- Born: November 27, 1984 (age 41) Henderson, Nevada, U.S.
- Listed height: 6 ft 11 in (2.11 m)
- Listed weight: 265 lb (120 kg)

Career information
- High school: Green Valley (Henderson, Nevada)
- College: Rhode Island (2002–2004); Vermont (2005–2007)
- NBA draft: 2007: undrafted
- Playing career: 2007–2015

Career history

Playing
- 2007–2008: Santa Pola
- 2008: HKK Široki
- 2008–2011: Sendai 89ers
- 2011: Dakota Wizards
- 2011–2013: Niigata Albirex BB
- 2013–2014: Kyoto Hannaryz
- 2014–2015: Shiga Lakestars
- 2015: Sendai 89ers

Coaching
- 2016–2019: George Washington (asst.)
- 2019–2020: Hamilton High School (asst.)
- 2020–present: Kyoto Hannaryz (asst.)

Career highlights
- 3x bj League Rebound leader

Christopher George Holm (born November 27, 1984) is an American former professional basketball player in Japan. He is an assistant coach for the Kyoto Hannaryz.

== Career statistics ==
Legend
GP	Games played	GS	Games started	MPG	Minutes per game
FG%	Field goal percentage	3P%	3-point field goal percentage	FT%	Free throw percentage
RPG	Rebounds per game	APG	Assists per game	SPG	Steals per game
BPG	Blocks per game	PPG	Points per game	**Bold**	Career high

*	Led the league

Year	Team	GP	GS	MPG	FG%	3P%	FT%	RPG	APG	SPG	BPG	PPG
2008–09	Sendai	52	52	34.2	.514	.250	.588	15.6*	2.1	0.8	1.1	15.0
2009–10	Sendai	52	52	32.1	.526	.000	.629	13.8	2.3	0.8	1.3	12.9
2010–11	Sendai	36	33	32.6	.565	.000	.643	13.4	1.9	1.2	0.8	14.4
2011–12	Niigata	52	43	29.8	.579	.000	.647	14.3*	1.9	1.0	0.9	11.5
2012–13	Niigata	52	51	30.2	.579	.000	.649	14.5*	2.2	.9	.9	11.3
2013–14	Kyoto	52	51	29.1	.543	---	.615	11.8	1.3	.9	1.0	9.1
2014–15	Shiga	52		20.7	.588	.000	.553	8.7	1.3	0.6	0.8	6.6
