= Perry Ellis (basketball) =

American basketball player

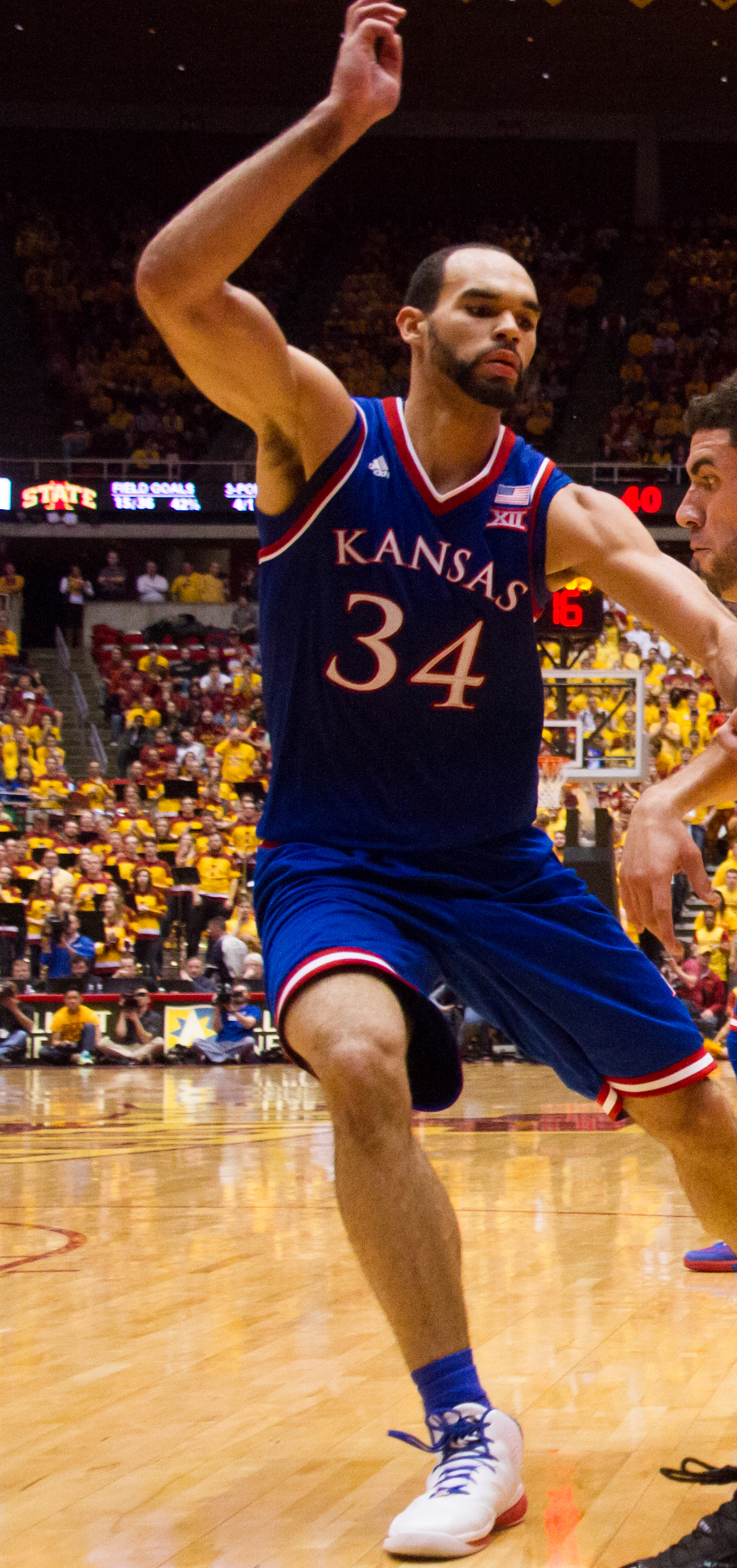
- Ellis playing for Kansas in 2016

No. 30 – Fukui Blowinds
- Position: Power forward
- League: B.League

Personal information
- Born: September 14, 1993 (age 32) Wichita, Kansas, U.S.
- Listed height: 6 ft 8 in (2.03 m)
- Listed weight: 218 lb (99 kg)

Career information
- High school: Wichita Heights (Wichita, Kansas)
- College: Kansas (2012–2016)
- NBA draft: 2016: undrafted
- Playing career: 2016–present

Career history
- 2016–2017: Greensboro Swarm
- 2017–2018: Sydney Kings
- 2018: Pallacanestro Cantù
- 2018–2019: s.Oliver Würzburg
- 2019: İstanbul BB
- 2019–2020: Osaka Evessa
- 2020–2021: Ehime Orange Vikings
- 2021–2022: Osaka Evessa
- 2022: Saga Ballooners
- 2022–2023: Cholet Basket
- 2023–present: Fukui Blowinds

Career highlights
- Consensus second-team All-American (2016); 2× First-team All-Big 12 (2015, 2016); Third-team All-Big 12 (2014); AP honorable mention All-American (2015); McDonald's All-American (2012); First-team Parade All-American (2012); Mr. Kansas Basketball (2012)
- Stats at Basketball Reference
Medals
Men's basketball
Representing United States
Summer Universiade
Gold medal – first place	2015 Gwangju	Team competition

Perry Michael Ellis (born September 14, 1993) is an American professional basketball player for Fukui Blowinds of the Japanese B.League. Ellis played college basketball for the Kansas Jayhawks. Playing for coach Bill Self, Ellis averaged 12.5 points and 5.8 rebounds over 144 college games, leading the Jayhawks to an 116–30 record that included 4 trips to the NCAA Tournament, including a trip to the Elite Eight during the 2015–2016 season.

== Early life ==
Ellis began playing basketball in first grade, and measured 6'1" in sixth grade. He attended Wichita Heights High School. He led Wichita Heights to four state titles, was named Kansas player of the year four times, and recorded a cumulative 2,231 points and 984 rebounds during his prep career. Academically, Ellis maintained a 4.0 GPA and was named valedictorian of his high school class. He was selected as a McDonald's All-American after his senior season in 2012.

== College career ==
Ellis scored a career-high 32 points on February 15, 2014, in a 95–65 victory over TCU. He contributed eight rebounds to go along with his 13-of-15 shooting. He averaged 13.6 points and 6.7 rebounds per game as a sophomore. Ellis scored more than 20 points in eight games that year. In July, he participated in the LeBron James Skills Academy.

In his junior season, Ellis led Kansas in scoring and rebounding with 13.8 points and 6.9 rebounds per game. He shot 45.7 percent from the field and 39.1 percent from behind the arc. Ellis was named to the First Team All-Big 12. He sprained his knee in a late-season game against West Virginia, derailing his season. Ellis considered entering the 2015 NBA draft after the season, but decided to return for his senior year after being told he would be selected in the second round.

With him coming back to the Jayhawks in his senior year, he contributed with 16.9 points and 5.9 rebounds per game. He shot 53.3 percent from the field, and 44.4 percent behind the arc. He was also named to the 35-man midseason watchlist for the Naismith Trophy on February 11, 2016.

During his time at Kansas, Ellis was a consensus second-team All-American pick his senior year and was Big 12 men's basketball scholar-athlete of the year for his junior and senior years.

== Professional career ==
After going undrafted in the 2016 NBA draft, Ellis joined the Dallas Mavericks for the 2016 NBA Summer League. On September 23, 2016, he signed with the Charlotte Hornets, but was waived on October 22 after appearing in one preseason game. On October 31, 2016, he was acquired by the Greensboro Swarm of the NBA Development League as an affiliate player of the Hornets. Ellis appeared in all 50 games for Greensboro in 2016–17, averaging 9.8 points and 4.7 rebounds per game.

On May 19, 2017, Ellis signed with the Sydney Kings of the Australian National Basketball League for the 2017–18 season. In July 2017, he played for the Minnesota Timberwolves during the 2017 NBA Summer League. In 27 games for the Kings, he averaged 14.8 points, 5.7 rebounds and 1.5 assists per game.

On February 25, 2018, Ellis signed with Pallacanestro Cantù of the Italian Lega Basket Serie A (LBA). He inked with the German team s.Oliver Würzburg on July 17, 2018.

On January 23, 2019, he signed with İstanbul BB of the Turkish Basketball Super League.

In July 2019, Ellis injured his right knee while playing in The Basketball Tournament for Self Made, a team of Kansas alumni. Ellis received surgery to repair his patellar tendon and spent 2019 rehabbing with plans of resuming his professional career. During his rehab, Ellis joined Bill Self's staff at Kansas as a video coordinator. He had a contract with Osaka Evessa in Japan, but because of the injury, the contract was voided.

On July 8, 2020, Ellis signed with Ehime Orange Vikings in Japan. Ellis averaged 18.3 points and 5.7 rebounds in 47 games for the Vikings. He hit 51.9% of his shots, including 43.7% from three-point range.

On June 13, 2021, Ellis re-signed with Osaka Evessa in Japan. He averaged 10.9 points, 3.5 rebounds and 1.8 assists per game. On January 22, 2022, Ellis signed with the Saga Ballooners. Appearing in 19 games for Saga, he averaged 15,3 points, 5,8 rebounds and 2,1 assists per outing.

On July 25, 2022, he signed with Cholet Basket of the French LNB Pro A.

On July 18, 2023, Ellis signed with Fukui Blowinds of the Japanese B.League.

== National team career ==
Ellis represented the United States at the 2015 World University Games. He averaged 13.3 points and 6.5 rebounds in leading Team USA to an 8–0 record and an 84–77 victory over Germany in the gold medal game.

== Personal life ==
Ellis was engaged to be married on June 18, 2021.
