= Gushiken =

Gushiken (具志堅, Okinawan:Gushichin) is an Okinawan surname of Okinawan (Ryukyuan) origin. Notable people with the surname include:

- Yoko Gushiken (The Okinawan Eagle), Japanese boxer, WBA Jr. flyweight champion 1976–1981
- Kapena Gushiken (born 2002), American football player
- Kōji Gushiken, Japanese Olympic gymnast
- Kosei Gushiken (born 1942), Japanese triple jumper
- Luiz Gushiken (1950–2013), Brazilian politician
