= Juan Guzman (boxer) =

Dominican boxer (1951–2021)

Juan Antonio Guzman
Personal information
- Nickname: El Pequeno Foreman
- Nationality: Dominican
- Born: Juan Antonio Guzmán Batista; August 21, 1951 Santiago de los Caballeros, Dominican Republic
- Died: May 2021 (aged 69) Bronx, New York City, United States
- Height: 5 ft 5 in (165 cm)
- Weight: light flyweight

Boxing career
- Stance: orthodox

Boxing record
- Total fights: 34
- Wins: 26
- Win by KO: 20
- Losses: 8

Juan Antonio Guzmán Batista (August 21, 1951 — May 2021), better known as Juan Guzman, was a Dominican former professional boxer and WBA world Junior Flyweight champion. Due to his high percentage of wins by knockout (specially for his division, the 108 pounds limit division), he was nicknamed "El Pequeno Foreman" ("Little Foreman", after George Foreman). Guzman was born in Santiago de los Caballeros, during the Rafael Trujillo dictatorship era.

== Professional career ==
Juan Guzman made his professional boxing debut on January 20, 1973, at the age of 21 years and almost 6 months old. He fought Francisco Gomez in Moca that night, prevailing by a six-round unanimous decision. In his next bout, Guzman scored his first professional win by knockout, defeating Matias Sandoval in the first round on February 9 at Puerto Plata. On March 12, he rematched Francisco Gomez, having his hand raised as winner by an eight-round unanimous decision at Santiago de los Caballeros; this was his first professional bout to take place at his hometown.

Next, Guzman battled Romon Rosario, again at Moca, knocking him out in the first round. This marked the start of an eight fight knockout winning streak which went from April 9, 1973, to October 15, 1974. As part of this streak, Guzman saw off challenges by Fausto Almonte twice; Ramon Rodriguez, Juan Barido, Sergio Rodriguez, Romon Rosario again, Juan Garcia and Juan Disla. By the time that Guzman was matched with Juan Sandoval on October 15, 1974 at Monte Cristi, he had already fought all over the Dominican Republic and abroad, making his Santo Domingo debut against Garcia (a first-round knockout win on July 6, 1974), and his international one against Sergio Rodriguez in Port-au-Prince, Haiti on March 18, also a first-round knockout win. Most of his wins by this period so far had been mismatches, due in part to the lack of Junior Flyweight fighters in the Dominican Republic at the time. Guzman defeated Juan Sandoval by a 6-round unanimous decision.

After the Sandoval match, Guzman embarked on another knockout streak, again reaching eight straight knockout victories. He beat Juan Pimentel, Miguel Minaya, Juan Disla and Fausto Almonte in back to back rematches, Domingo Santana and Sergio Garces. Each of these bouts took place in the Dominican Republic but for the fight with Garces, which was held at Port-au-Prince, Haiti. Every fight during that streak ended in three or less rounds.

On August 18, 1975, Guzman somewhat surprisingly lost his condition as an undefeated boxer when matched against Puerto Rican prospect Luis Rosario, 3–0–1 coming in, at Santo Domingo. Rosario, who had come off a draw (tie) with Rafael Solis and would later extend world champions Julian Solís (Rafael's brother) and Alfonso Zamora the ten round distance, defeated Guzman by surviving the initial rounds and extending him, before taking Guzman out in round ten by knockout.

Guzman recovered with wins over Frank Palofax and Aniceto Vargas; both those fights took place at San Juan, Puerto Rico, the Vargas one at Coliseo Roberto Clemente. By then he was a top-ten ranked Junior Flyweight by the World Boxing Association.

== World championship ==
WBA world Junior Flyweight champion Jaime Rios of Panama was 18–1–1 when he came to the Dominican Republic to defend his title against local Guzman during June 1976. Their fight took place on July 2, at Santo Domingo. It was a close fight through 15 rounds, not much stylistically separating champion and challenger. At the end, however, Guzman was deemed winner by a very close margin, a split decision with scores of 146–145 by judge Roberto Lopez and 146–144 by judge Salcedo in favor of Guzman, referee Isidro Rodriguez voting for champion Rios by 145–144.

Guzman did not enjoy his status as a current world champion very long. Three months later, on October 10, 1976, he travelled to Yamanashi, Japan, to meet 8–0 challenger, Yoko Gushiken, who stopped Guzman in seven rounds to take the world title away. Gushiken was later voted into the International Boxing Hall of Fame.

== Rest of career ==
Guzman took off more than one year away from boxing before returning on November 19, 1979, beating Santos Nunez, a fighter with a negative, 1–6 record, by a ten-round unanimous decision at San Juan, Puerto Rico. He was then defeated by Jose Ortiz on February 18, 1978, at San Juan by a ten-round unanimous decision. This result was an upset; Ortiz had never won a professional fight before, and he would never again win. On July 2, 1978, Guzman boxed future two-division, three-time world champion Hilario Zapata at Gimnasio Nuevo Panama, Panama City, Panama. Despite some early success and dropping Zapata in round two, Guzman lost by ten round unanimous decision to Zapata, who was 4–0 coming in. This was followed by another defeat, this time at the hands of future Lupe Pintor world Bantamweight title challenger Jovito Rengifo at Caracas, Venezuela, by an eighth-round knockout, on February 1, 1980. Then, Guzman fought popular Mexican fighter, future North American Boxing Federation Bantamweight champion Candido Tellez, on September 4, 1980 at Los Angeles, losing by knockout in round one.

Guzman's last two fights took place on September 8, 1981 at La Romana and then on July 2, 1982, at the Auditorium in Miami Beach, Florida. He lost both by first-round knockouts, to future world Flyweight champion Eleoncio Mercedes and to Chilean national hero Martin Vargas.

Guzman retired with a record of 26 wins and 8 losses in 34 bouts, 20 wins coming by way of knockout. He afterwards worked as a coach at the Gleason's Gym in Brooklyn, while trying to establish a boxing school in Upper Manhattan.

The former boxer died from massive heart attack in his apartment in Bronx in May 2021. His body was found on Saturday, May 8, when neighbours, disturbed by fetid smell, called 911.

Achievements
Preceded by Jaime Rios	WBA Light Flyweight Champion; 2 Jul 1976– 10 Oct 1976	Succeeded by Yoko Gushiken
