= Pedro Flores (boxer) =

Mexican boxer (born 1951)

Personal information
- Nickname: Machine Gun
- Born: 14 January 1951 (age 75) Guadalajara, Jalisco, Mexico
- Height: 5 ft 2 in (157 cm)
- Weight: Light flyweight; Flyweight

Boxing career
- Reach: 70 in (178 cm)
- Stance: Orthodox

Boxing record
- Total fights: 26
- Wins: 17
- Win by KO: 5
- Losses: 9
Medal record
Men's amateur boxing
Representing Mexico
Pan American Games
Gold medal – first place	1971 Cali	Bantamweight

Pedro Flores (born 14 January 1951) is a Mexican former professional boxer who competed from 1973 to 1982, holding the WBA light flyweight title in 1981.

== Professional career ==
In November 1973, in Pedro's pro debut he upset the undefeated Ramon Novelo by T.K.O. in the seventh round.

=== WBA Light Flyweight Championship ===
After compiling a record of 16-6, Flores earned a shot at the WBA light flyweight title against Yoko Gushiken, he would lose via a unanimous decision. Five months later Flores would rematch Gushiken this time winning via twelfth round T.K.O. in Gushikawa, Okinawa, Japan.

== Professional boxing record ==
26 fights	17 wins	9 losses
By knockout	5	4
By decision	12	4
By disqualification	0	1

No.	Result	Record	Opponent	Type	Round, time	Date	Age	Location	Notes
26	Loss	17–9	Lupe Madera	PTS	10	Jul 24, 1982	31 years, 344 days	Carte Clara Baseball Park, Merida, Yucatán, Mexico	
25	Loss	17–8	Kim Hwan-jin	TKO	13 (15)	Jul 19, 1981	30 years, 339 days	Kyongbuk Gymnasium, Daegu, South Korea	Lost WBA light flyweight title
24	Win	17–7	Yoko Gushiken	KO	12 (15)	Mar 8, 1981	30 years, 206 days	City Gymnasium, Gushikawa, Okinawa, Japan	Won WBA light flyweight title
23	Loss	16–7	Yoko Gushiken	UD	15	Oct 12, 1980	30 years, 59 days	Jissen Rinri Hall, Kanazawa, Ishikawa, Japan	For WBA light flyweight title
22	Win	16–6	Jose Gallegos	PTS	12	Jun 13, 1980	29 years, 304 days	Monterrey, Nuevo León, Mexico	Won Mexico flyweight title
21	Win	15–6	Jose Luis Cruz	PTS	10	Feb 2, 1980	29 years, 172 days	Mexico City, Distrito Federal, Mexico	
20	Win	14–6	Pedro Galaviz	PTS	10	Sep 8, 1979	29 years, 25 days	Mexico City, Distrito Federal, Mexico	
19	Win	13–6	Jose Luis Valencia	PTS	10	Jun 9, 1979	28 years, 299 days	Mexico City, Distrito Federal, Mexico	
18	Win	12–6	Samuel Machorro	PTS	10	Mar 24, 1979	28 years, 222 days	Mexico City, Distrito Federal, Mexico	
17	Win	11–6	Kid Remolino	KO	6 (?)	May 1, 1978	27 years, 260 days	Apatzingan, Michoacán de Ocampo, Mexico	Exact date unknown
16	Loss	10–6	Freddy Castillo	DQ	8 (?)	Jul 6, 1977	26 years, 326 days	Merida, Yucatán, Mexico	
15	Win	10–5	Matias Marin	PTS	10	Jun 15, 1977	26 years, 305 days	Merida, Yucatán, Mexico	
14	Loss	9–5	Adelaido Galindo	TKO	3 (?)	Jul 3, 1976	25 years, 324 days	Arena Coliseo, Mexico City, Distrito Federal, Mexico	
13	Win	9–4	Roberto Marin	PTS	10	Apr 21, 1976	25 years, 251 days	Tecoman, Colima, Mexico	
12	Loss	8–4	Juan Alvarez	PTS	10	Feb 7, 1976	25 years, 177 days	Arena Coliseo, Mexico City, Distrito Federal, Mexico	
11	Loss	8–3	Valentin Martinez	TKO	7 (10)	Nov 1, 1975	25 years, 79 days	Mexico City, Distrito Federal, Mexico	
10	Loss	8–2	Amado Ursua	KO	3 (?)	Sep 27, 1975	25 years, 44 days	Arena México, Mexico City, Distrito Federal, Mexico	
9	Loss	8–1	Alberto Morales	UD	12	Jul 19, 1975	24 years, 339 days	Acapulco, Guerrero, Mexico	For Mexico flyweight title
8	Win	8–0	Manuel Montiel	PTS	10	May 28, 1975	24 years, 287 days	Mexico City, Distrito Federal, Mexico	
7	Win	7–0	Evaristo Perez	PTS	10	Mar 5, 1975	24 years, 203 days	Mexico City, Distrito Federal, Mexico	
6	Win	6–0	Porfirio Perez	PTS	10	Oct 30, 1974	24 years, 77 days	Mexico City, Distrito Federal, Mexico	
5	Win	5–0	Jose Luis Cetina	PTS	10	Sep 15, 1974	24 years, 32 days	Merida, Yucatán, Mexico	
4	Win	4–0	Juan Alvarez	PTS	10	Jul 12, 1974	23 years, 332 days	Arena Coliseo, Guadalajara, Jalisco, Mexico	
3	Win	3–0	Francisco Javier Nunez	TKO	9 (10)	Jun 12, 1974	23 years, 302 days	Arena Coliseo, Guadalajara, Jalisco, Mexico	
2	Win	2–0	Teo Jimenez	TKO	2 (?)	Nov 30, 1973	23 years, 108 days	Colima, Mexico	
1	Win	1–0	Ramon Novela	TKO	7 (?)	Nov 7, 1973	23 years, 85 days	Colima, Mexico	

== See also ==
- List of Mexican boxing world champions
- List of world light-flyweight boxing champions

Sporting positions
World boxing titles
Preceded by Yoko Gushiken	WBA light flyweight champion 8 March 1981 – 19 July 1981	Succeeded by Kim Hwan-jin
