= Kyoto Hannaryz =

Professional basketball team in Kyoto, Japan

- Conference: West
- Division: First
- Leagues: B.League
- Founded: 2009; 17 years ago
- Arena: Kyoto City Gymnasium
- Location: Kyoto, Kyoto
- Main sponsor: Screen Holdings
- General manager: Sunao Murakami
- Head coach: Tsutomu Isa
- Website: hannaryz.jp
Home	Away

The Kyoto Hannaryz (京都ハンナリーズ, Kyōto Hannarīzu) are a Japanese professional basketball team based in Kyoto. The team competes in the B.League Premier, the highest division of the B.League, as a member of the Western Conference. The team plays its home games at Kyoto City Gymnasium.

The name Hannaryz refers to the Japanese term hannari (はんなり), the concept of lively but restrained elegance embodied by the people and culture of Kyoto.

== Coaches ==
- David Benoit (2009–10)
- Kazuto Aono (2010–11)
- Honoo Hamaguchi (2011–20)
- Shinya Ogawa (2020–22)
- Roy Rana (2022–25)
- Tsutomu Isa (2025–present)

== Roster ==
Kyoto Hannaryz roster
Players
Coaches

Pos.	No.	Nat.	Name	Ht.	Age
F	0	(Japan)	Ryoma Ono	1.97 m (6 ft 6 in)	38 – 6 January 1988
G	3	(Japan)	Leon Shibuda	1.76 m (5 ft 9 in)	28 – 22 August 1998
G/F	7	(Japan)	Shuba Nishibe	1.89 m (6 ft 2 in)	23 – 20 May 2003
C	10	(United States)	Charles Jackson	2.08 m (6 ft 10 in)	33 – 22 May 1993
G	12	(Japan)	Asato Ogawa	1.76 m (5 ft 9 in)	25 – 23 August 2001
G	13	(Japan)	Satoru Maeda	1.92 m (6 ft 4 in)	29 – 6 March 1997
G	15	(Japan)	Hayato Kawashima	1.86 m (6 ft 1 in)	36 – 15 May 1990
G	16	(Japan)	Ryunosuke Watanabe	1.89 m (6 ft 2 in)	32 – 24 August 1994
F	24	(Japan)	Faraz Rashid	2.02 m (6 ft 8 in)	29 – 13 September 1997
F	32	(United States)	Angelo Caloiaro	2.03 m (6 ft 8 in)	37 – 28 July 1989
F	33	(United States)	Ira Brown	1.98 m (6 ft 6 in)	44 – 3 August 1982
F/C	35	(United States)	Jordan Heath	2.10 m (6 ft 11 in)	35 – 20 August 1991
F	39	(Japan)	Mone Alex Hall	1.90 m (6 ft 3 in)	27 – 19 May 1999
G/F	51	(Japan)	Takatoshi Furukawa	1.90 m (6 ft 3 in)	39 – 20 October 1987

Head coach

Tsutomu Isa

Assistant coach(es)

- Shogo Fukuda
- Sho Uesegi
- Mondo Naeki

Legend

- (C) Team captain
- Injured

- Roster
Updated: 19 May 2026

== Notable players ==
Note: Flags indicate national team eligibility at FIBA-sanctioned events. Players may hold other non-FIBA nationalities not displayed.

Criteria

To appear in this section a player must have either:

- Set a club record or won an individual award while at the club
- Played at least one official international match for their national team at any time
- Played at least one official NBA match at any time.

- Mahmoud Abdul-Rauf: 2009-2011
- Lance Allred
- David Benoit
- Josh Bostic
- Jermaine Boyette
- Babacar Camara
- Mo Charlo
- Marcus Cousin
- Lee Cummard
- Marcus Dove
- Moses Ehambe: 2015-
- Ryan Forehan-Kelly: 2014–2015
- Lawrence Hill
- Chris Holm
- Tyren Johnson
- Julian Mavunga
- Larry Owens
- David Palmer (basketball): 2012–
- Gyno Pomare
- Reda Rhalimi
- Rick Rickert
- Joshua Smith
- Kibwe Trim
- Edwin Ubiles
- Ekpe Udoh
- Wendell White
