= Devin Williams (basketball) =

American basketball player (born 1994)

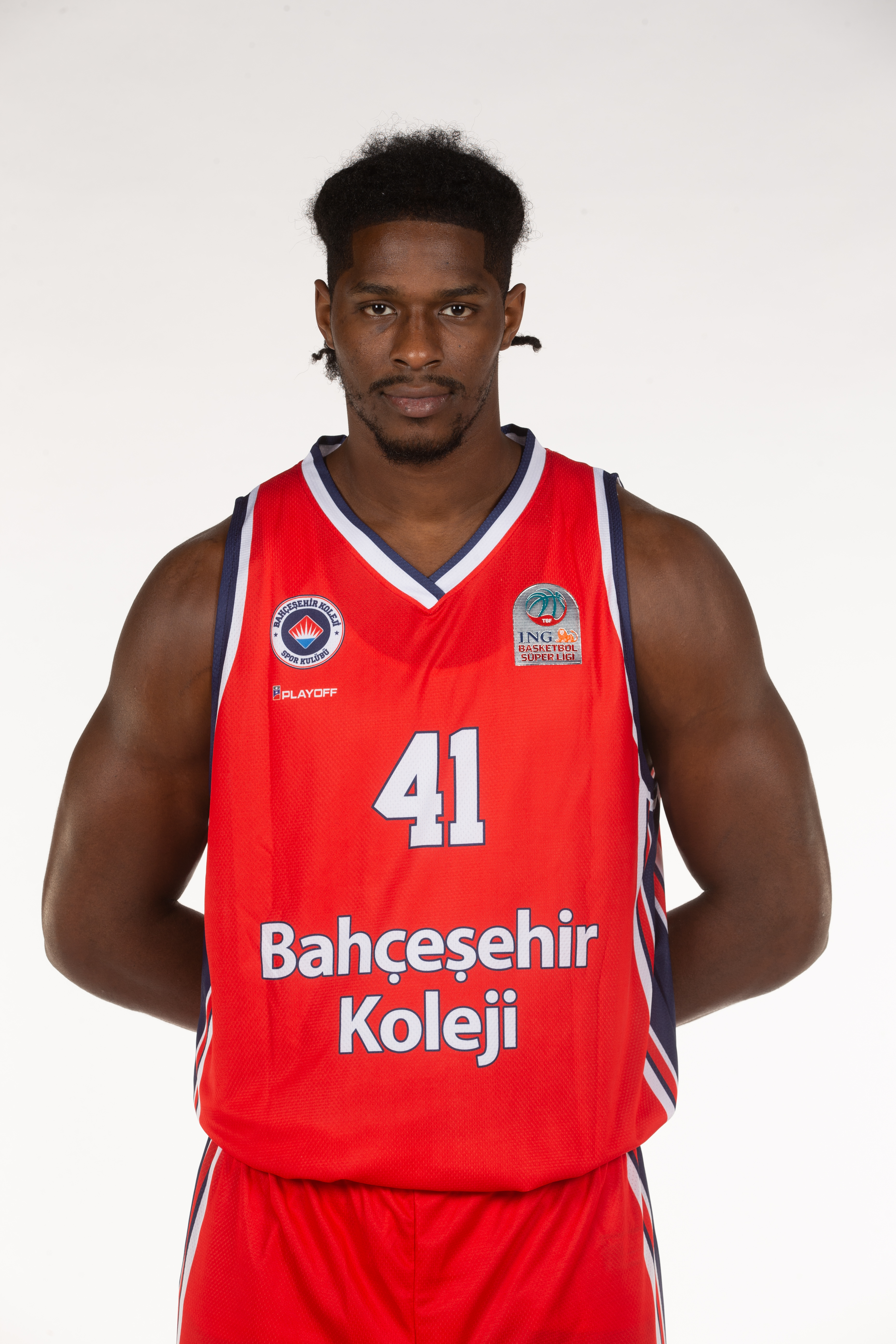
- Williams with Bahçeşehir Koleji in 2021

No. 41 – Fukui Blowinds
- Position: Power forward / center
- League: B.League

Personal information
- Born: May 31, 1994 (age 32) Cincinnati, Ohio, U.S.
- Listed height: 6 ft 9 in (2.06 m)
- Listed weight: 270 lb (122 kg)

Career information
- High school: Withrow (Cincinnati, Ohio); Montverde Academy (Montverde, Florida)
- College: West Virginia (2013–2016)
- NBA draft: 2016: undrafted
- Playing career: 2016–present

Career history
- 2016–2017: Melbourne United
- 2017: Greensboro Swarm
- 2017–2018: Maine Red Claws
- 2018: Vaqueros de Bayamón
- 2018–2019: Büyükçekmece
- 2019: Budućnost
- 2019–2020: Tofaş
- 2020–2021: Jiangsu Dragons
- 2021: Goyang Orion Orions
- 2021: Bahçeşehir Koleji
- 2022–2023: Jiangsu Dragons
- 2023–2025: Taoyuan Taiwan Beer Leopards
- 2025: NBA G League United
- 2025–2026: Fujian Sturgeons
- 2026: Mets de Guaynabo
- 2026-present: Fukui Blowinds

Career highlights
- EuroCup Top 16 MVP (2020); T1 League champion (2024); TPBL rebounds leader (2025); T1 League rebounds leader (2024); Montenegrin League champion (2019); Montenegrin Cup winner (2019); Turkish Super League rebounding leader (2019); Second-team All-Big 12 (2016)
- Stats at Basketball Reference

Devin Jamar Williams (born May 31, 1994) is an American professional basketball player for the Fukui Blowinds of the B.League. He played college basketball at West Virginia.

== High school career ==
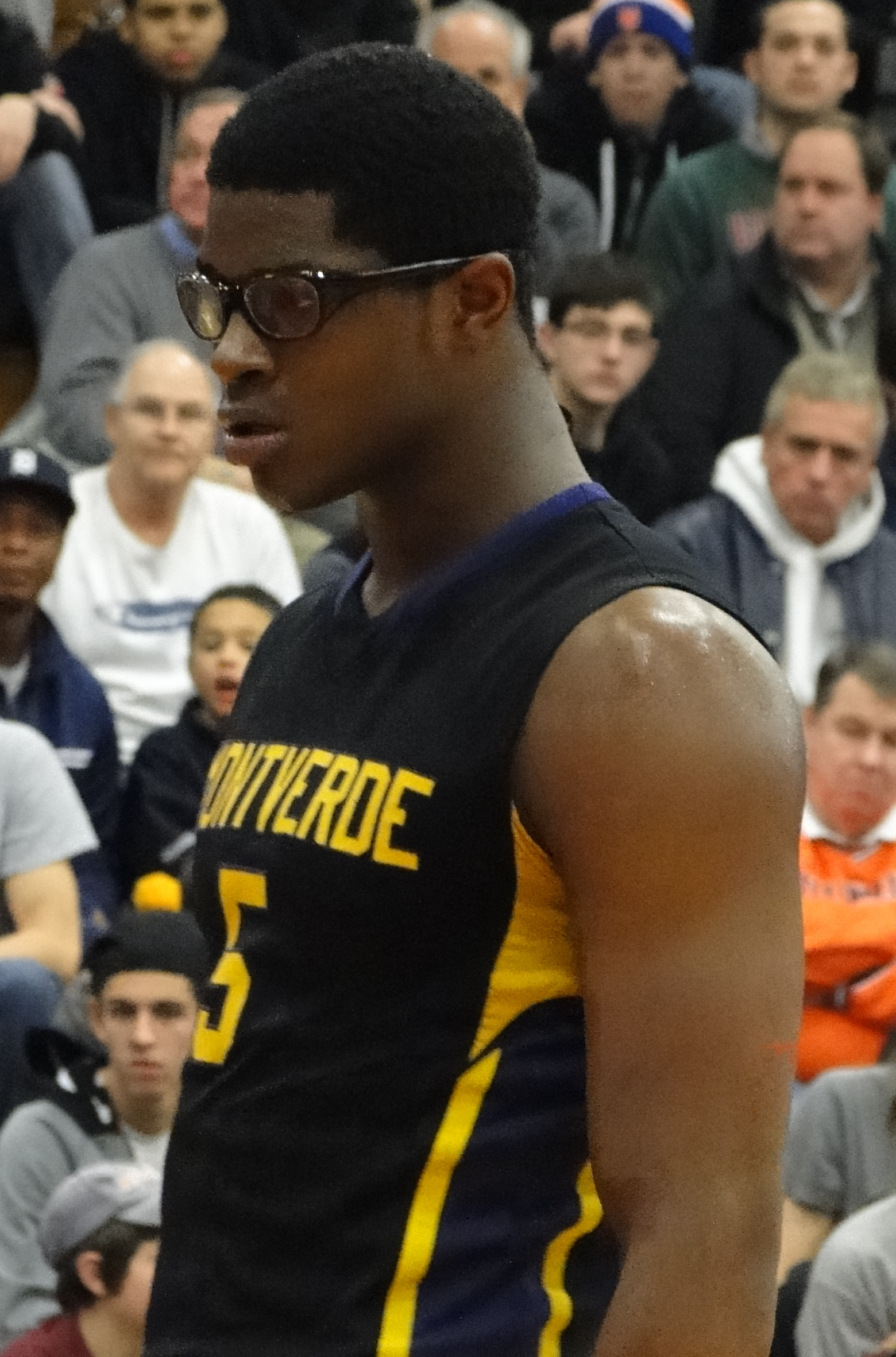
Williams with Monteverde Academy in 2012

Williams first attended Withrow High School in his hometown of Cincinnati, Ohio. As a sophomore in 2010–11, he averaged 13.0 points and 10.6 rebounds per game for the school's basketball team. As a junior at Withrow in 2011–12, he averaged 15.2 points and 10.5 rebounds per game and earned All-Cincinnati Metro Athletic Conference First Team honors.

In 2012, Williams transferred to Montverde Academy in Montverde, Florida for his senior year. In April 2013, he helped Montverde rally from a 16-point deficit to beat Saint Benedict's Preparatory School 67–65 in the final of the High School National Tournament. On a roster full of Division I recruits, Williams was first-team all-state for independent players.

== College career ==
=== Freshman year ===
As a freshman at West Virginia in 2013–14, Williams started 31 of 33 games, averaging 23.3 minutes per game. He shot 41.1 percent from the field and averaged 8.4 points per game while leading the team in rebounds with 7.2 per game. He was subsequently named to the Academic All-Big 12 Rookie Team. He posted eight double-doubles and had nine double-figure rebounding performances throughout the season. His eight double-doubles are the third most all-time by a WVU freshman, and he tied for the most double-doubles by a Big 12 Conference freshman with Kansas' Joel Embiid. Williams' 238 rebounds were the fourth most all-time by a WVU freshman, as he finished seventh in the Big 12 Conference in rebounds per game. On March 8, 2014, he scored a season-high 22 points and tied his season high for rebounds with 13 in a 92–86 win over Kansas.

=== Sophomore year ===
Williams with West Virginia in 2015

As a sophomore in 2014–15, Williams played in 34 games for the Mountaineers, starting all 34 of those contests, and averaged 24.9 minutes per game. He registered 11.6 points and led WVU in rebounding with 8.1 boards per game. He was 15th in the Big 12 Conference in scoring and third in rebounding, and had the second-most double-doubles in the Big 12 with nine. He subsequently earned All-Big 12 Honorable Mention honors. On March 7, 2015, he tied his career-best performance with 22 points and 13 rebounds in an 81–72 win over Oklahoma State.

=== Junior year ===
As a junior in 2015–16, Williams started 34 of 35 games for the Mountaineers, averaging 25.4 minutes per game. He averaged career highs in points (13.3), rebounds (9.5) and assists (1.4), and subsequently earned second-team All-Big 12, USBWA All-District II Team and NABC All-District 8 second team honors. Williams also earned Big 12 All-Tournament Team honors after recording 31 points and 10 rebounds in the Big 12 Tournament championship game, a game West Virginia lost 81–71 to Kansas. The point total was a career best and it marked his 15th double-double of the season, the most of any Big 12 player. He became just the 11th player in West Virginia program history to record 1,000 points and 800 rebounds.

On March 29, 2016, Williams declared for the NBA draft, forgoing his final year of college eligibility. He subsequently signed with an agent in April but was not invited to the NBA combine. He later admitted he "received some bad advice" regarding the draft.

== Professional career ==
=== Melbourne United (2016–2017) ===
After going undrafted in the 2016 NBA draft, Williams joined the Milwaukee Bucks for the 2016 NBA Summer League in Las Vegas. In five games for the Bucks, he averaged 2.0 points and 2.4 rebounds in 7.6 minutes per game.

On August 9, 2016, Williams signed with Melbourne United for the 2016–17 NBL season. Williams struggled to make an impact for United off the bench over the first month of the season, which led to speculation of him being released by the club. That was not to be, and on November 6, he had a season-best game with 13 points and seven rebounds in an 82–73 loss to the Illawarra Hawks. His next best game came on December 11, as he had a 6-point, 10-rebound effort in an 88–81 win over the Sydney Kings. In the following game however on December 17, Williams went down with a knee injury early in United's 100–90 loss to the Brisbane Bullets, and was subsequently ruled out for four to six weeks with a Grade 2 medial ligament strain. On January 31, 2017, after fully recovering, Williams was granted a release from his contract to source opportunities to play in the US.

=== Greensboro Swarm and Maine Red Claws (2017–2018) ===
On February 14, 2017, he was acquired by the Greensboro Swarm of the NBA Development League.

In June 2017, Williams joined the Charlotte Hornets for the 2017 NBA Summer League. On September 26, 2017, he signed with the Boston Celtics for training camp. He was waived by the Celtics on October 5, 2017.

On April 25, 2018, Vaqueros de Bayamón of the Baloncesto Superior Nacional was reported to have signed Williams.

=== Büyükçekmece and Budućnost (2018–2019) ===
On July 13, 2018, he has signed with Büyükçekmece of the Basketball Super League (BSL).

On February 14, 2019, Williams signed with Budućnost of the Montenegrin League.

=== Tofaş (2019–2020) ===
On July 2, 2019, he has signed with Tofaş of the Turkish Basketball Super League. Williams averaged 15.4 points, 7.5 rebounds and 1.9 assists per game.

=== Jiangsu Dragons (2020–2021) ===
On September 16, 2020, Williams signed with Jiangsu Dragons of the Chinese Basketball Association.

=== Bahçeşehir Koleji and Unicaja Málaga (2021–2022) ===
On July 7, 2021, Williams signed with Bahçeşehir Koleji of the Basketbol Süper Ligi, (BSL). He played three games and averaged 2.3 points per game.

On January 22, 2022, Williams signed with Unicaja Málaga of the Spanish Liga ACB. On January 27, 2022, Unicaja Malaga has announced that Devin Williams has failed his medicals and therefore the agreement between the parts has been voided.

On February 21, 2022, Williams signed with Vaqueros de Bayamón.

=== Taiwan Beer Leopards and Taoyuan Taiwan Beer Leopards (2023–2025) ===
On October 7, 2023, Williams has signed with TaiwanBeer Leopards of the T1 League. He was the league's rebounds leader for the 2023–24 season.

On August 9, 2024, Williams re-signed with the Taoyuan Taiwan Beer Leopards of the Taiwan Professional Basketball League (TPBL). He was the league's rebounds leader for the 2024–25 season.

On May 29, 2025, Williams signed with the Changwon LG Sakers of the Basketball Champions League Asia (BCL Asia). He was later replaced by Kevin Allen due to a calf injury.

== Personal life ==
Williams is the son of Angela Williams, and had two older brothers. Donshae Williams, the youngest of Williams' two older brothers, was shot and killed in Cincinnati in August 2011, just before Williams started his junior year at Withrow High. In December 2015, Williams said of the incident, "Just a bad night. Wrong place, wrong time. It's sad, but that's how my city is. That's how my city is going. I just use it for motivation to get my nephew out of there and make it better for him and the whole family."
