= Protógenes Queiroz =

Brazilian former Federal Police officer (born 1959)

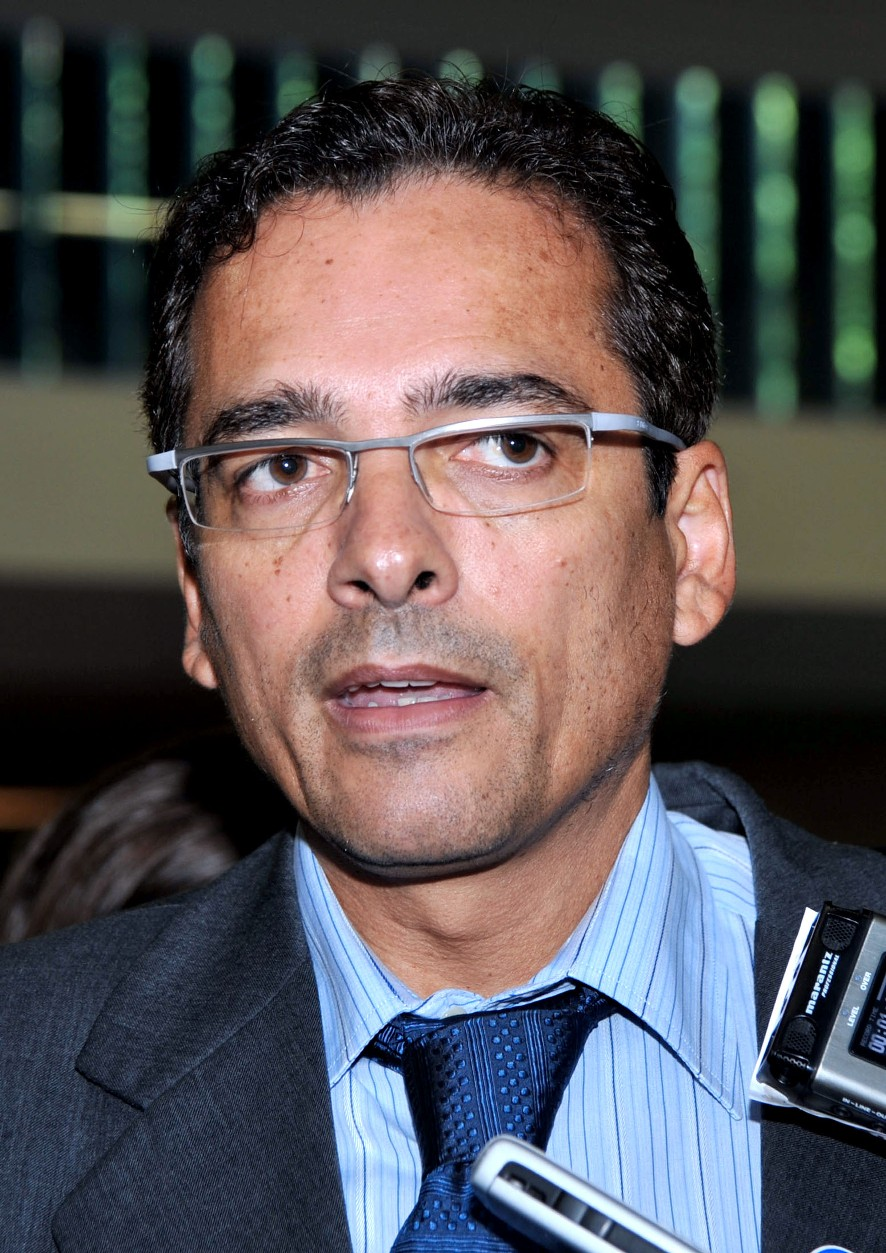
- Born: May 20, 1959 (age 66)
- Police career
- Allegiance: Brazil
- Department: Federal Police of Brazil
- Status: Suspended indefinitely
- Other work: Politician

Protógenes Pinheiro Queiroz (born May 20, 1959) is a Brazilian former Federal Police officer, who has led investigations in some of the country's most high-profile corruption cases. Queiroz was responsible for investigations leading to imprisonment of the former mayor of São Paulo, Paulo Maluf. He was a key figure in two investigations, in 2005 and 2007, into corruption scandals in Brazilian football, the latter against Boris Berezovsky's MSI group for money laundering in Corinthians. From 2004 to July 2008 Quieroz led Operation Satiagraha, a major operation into misuse of public funds, money laundering and corruption, leading to the arrest of the banker Daniel Dantas and several other prominent figures, including Celso Pitta, another former mayor of São Paulo.

Queiroz is a well-known but controversial figure in Brazil. While he has been frequently praised as a lone fighter for truth and justice in a corrupt system, he has also been criticised and investigated for going beyond his authority in the way he conducts his investigations.

On April 13, 2009, Protogenes Queiroz was suspended indefinitely from the Federal Police for engaging in political activity. Queiroz is now officially affiliated to the PCdoB (Communist Party of Brazil), and has declared that he will run for congress in 2010.

== Operation Satiagraha ==
For nearly four years (2004–2008), Queiroz led Operation Satiagraha, a Brazilian federal police investigation into misuse of public funds, corruption and money laundering. Satiagraha resulted in the arrest on July 8, 2008 of several bankers, bank directors and investors. The most high-profile figure investigated in Satiagraha was the banker Daniel Dantas. Dantas was arrested twice by Queiroz in early July 2008 on charges of money laundering and tax evasion (on the second occasion Queiroz handcuffed Dantas personally) but each time released almost immediately. The President of the Supreme Court Gilmar Mendes gave Dantas two habeas corpus in less than two days. Daniel Dantas was finally convicted to ten years' imprisonment in December 2008 for attempting to bribe a police officer.

In an interview the Procurator of the Republic, Rodrigo de Grandis, stated that the purpose of Satiagraha was to investigate two distinct criminal operations, one of which was led by Dantas. Both of these operations focused on crimes in the financial market. Queiroz said that the objective of Satiagraha was to "combat a pernicious situation for our country. We were shocked by the scale of the two organisations, the level of intimidation and their power to corrupt."

In mid July 2008, Queiroz was removed from Operation Satiagraha by Luiz Fernando Corrêa, the head of Federal Police, for breaking the chain of command by not informing his superiors of the involvement of secret service agents. At the time that Queiroz left Operation Satiagraha, President Luiz Inácio Lula da Silva called unsuccessfully for Quieroz to be reinstated to the case.

Following the removal of Queiroz from the Operation, he was investigated for collaborating with members of the Brazilian secret service, ABIN, in the use of allegedly illegal telephone taps.
