= Kazuki Kotera =

Japanese footballer

Personal information
- Full name: Kazuki Kotera
- Date of birth: July 10, 1983 (age 43)
- Place of birth: Shiga, Japan
- Height: 1.71 m (5 ft 7 1/2 in)
- Position: Midfielder

Youth career
- 2002–2005: Kindai University

Senior career*
Years	Team	Apps	(Gls)
2006–2007	Sagawa Printing	13	(0)
2008–2009	Okinawa Kariyushi FC	32	(9)
2010–2014	FC Ryukyu	117	(1)
Total		162	(10)
- * Club domestic league appearances and goals

Kazuki Kotera (小寺 一生, Kotera Kazuki; born July 10, 1983) is a former Japanese football player.

== Playing career ==
Kazuki Kotera played for Sagawa Printing, Okinawa Kariyushi FC and FC Ryukyu from 2006 to 2014.
