= Yoko Gushiken =

Japanese boxer

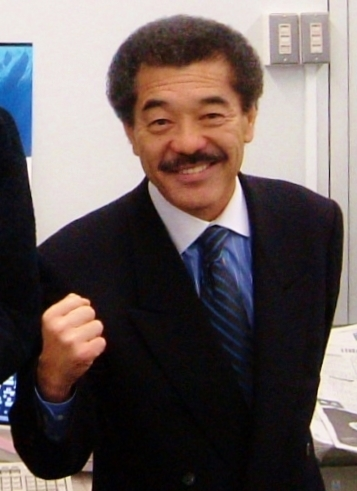
- Gushiken in March 2003

Personal information
- Nickname: Fierce Eagle
- Nationality: Japanese
- Born: 26 June 1955 (age 71) Ishigaki, USCAR (nowadays Okinawa, Japan)
- Weight: Light-flyweight

Boxing career
- Stance: Southpaw

Boxing record
- Total fights: 24
- Wins: 23
- Win by KO: 15
- Losses: 1

Yoko Gushiken (具志堅 用高, Gushiken Yōkō; born 26 June 1955) is a Japanese former professional boxer who competed from 1974 to 1981. He held the WBA light-flyweight title from 1976 to 1981, making a total of 13 successful defences. Following his retirement from boxing, he remains popular in Japan as a tarento having signed a contract with Ohta Production. He is well known in Japan for his trademark hair style.

Gushiken was inducted in 2015 to the International Boxing Hall of Fame.

== Biography ==
Gushiken was known for having strong stamina, allowing him to pressure opponents into mistakes after many rounds. His southpaw stance allowed him to take advantage of many mistakes, usually by throwing unexpected combinations of punches instead of waiting for counterpunch opportunities.

His popularity centered in mainland Japan, where he was known by the nickname Kanmuriwashi (Fierce Eagle) and crowds were normally sold out. He quickly rose through the amateur ranks and won All-Japan in high school.

=== WBA light-flyweight champion ===
After that, he went pro and fought for the WBA light-flyweight title after just nine professional fights. He defeated Juan Antonio Guzmán, a well-seasoned pro, by knockout in the seventh round. He held the title for over four years, making thirteen defenses and winning eight by knockout.

Jaime Rios nearly defeated Gushiken in 1977 and 1978, but lost after wilting in the last rounds of the match. Other victories of note were against Panama's future world champions Alfonso Lopez and Rafael Pedroza. As with Rios, they lost after many rounds of being worn down by Gushiken.

In his thirteenth title defense, he fought Pedro Flores, winning by a close margin. In the rematch, Flores was better at reserving his energy and defeated Gushiken by knockout in the twelfth round. Many expected Gushiken to return to the ring, but he announced his retirement five months after his loss.

=== Tarento ===
Despite retiring from boxing in 1981, he remains a popular figure in Japan. As a tarento he has appeared on countless variety and quiz shows, including "Cream Quiz! Miracle 9" where he is a regular.

== Professional boxing record ==
24 fights	23 wins	1 loss
By knockout	15	1
By decision	8	0

No.	Result	Record	Opponent	Type	Round, time	Date	Location	Notes
24	Lose	23–1	Pedro Flores	KO	12 (15), 1:45	8 Mar 1981	City Gymnasium, Gushikawa, Japan	Lost WBA light-flyweight title
23	Win	23–0	Pedro Flores	UD	15	12 Oct 1980	Jissen Rinri Hall, Kanazawa, Japan	Retained WBA light-flyweight title
22	Win	22–0	Martin Vargas	KO	8 (15), 1:42	1 Jun 1980	Prefectural Gymnasium, Osaka, Japan	Retained WBA light-flyweight title
21	Win	21–0	Yong-Hyun Kim	UD	15	27 Jan 1980	Prefectural Gymnasium, Osaka, Japan	Retained WBA light-flyweight title
20	Win	20–0	Tito Abella	KO	7 (15), 0:53	28 Oct 1979	Kokugikan, Tokyo, Japan	Retained WBA light-flyweight title
19	Win	19–0	Rafael Pedroza	UD	15	29 Jul 1979	City Gymnasium, Kitakyushu, Japan	Retained WBA light-flyweight title
18	Win	18–0	Alfonso Lopez	KO	7 (15), 2:47	8 Apr 1979	Kokugikan, Tokyo, Japan	Retained WBA light-flyweight title
17	Win	17–0	Rigoberto Marcano	KO	7 (15), 2:47	7 Jan 1979	City Gymnasium, Kawasaki, Japan	Retained WBA light-flyweight title
16	Win	16–0	Sang Il Jung	KO	5 (15), 0:22	15 Oct 1978	Kokugikan, Tokyo, Japan	Retained WBA light-flyweight title
15	Win	15–0	Mak Dong Kim	KO	6 (15), 2:22	14 Aug 1978	City Gymnasium, Ōmiya, Japan	
14	Win	14–0	Jaime Rios	KO	13 (15), 2:59	7 May 1978	Prefectural Gymnasium, Hiroshima, Japan	Retained WBA light-flyweight title
13	Win	13–0	Aniceto Vargas	KO	14 (15), 0:27	29 Jan 1978	Aichi Prefectural Gym, Nagoya, Japan	Retained WBA light-flyweight title
12	Win	12–0	Montsayarm Haw Mahachai	KO	4 (15), 2:17	9 Oct 1977	Hot Spring Pool, Beppu, Japan	Retained WBA light-flyweight title
11	Win	11–0	Rigoberto Marcano	SD	15	22 May 1977	Makomanai Indoor Arena, Sapporo, Japan	Retained WBA light-flyweight title
10	Win	10–0	Jaime Rios	SD	15	30 Jan 1977	Nippon Budokan, Tokyo, Japan	Retained WBA light-flyweight title
9	Win	9–0	Juan Antonio Guzmán	KO	7 (15), 0:32	10 Oct 1976	Yamanashi Gakuin Gym, Kofu, Japan	Won WBA light-flyweight title
8	Win	8–0	Toshihisa Takii	KO	3 (10), 2:44	16 Jul 1976	Korakuen Hall, Tokyo, Japan	
7	Win	7–0	Cesar Gomez Kee	KO	7 (10), 2:16	23 Jan 1976	City Gymnasium, Kawasaki, Japan	
6	Win	6–0	Shoji Warabino	KO	6 (10), 1:25	19 Oct 1975	City Gymnasium, Okinawa, Japan	
5	Win	5–0	Yasuo Jo	PTS	6	25 Jun 1975	Onoyama Gym, Naha, Japan	
4	Win	4–0	Yasunobu Nitta	KO	4 (8), 2:36	9 Mar 1975	Onoyama Gym, Naha, Japan	
3	Win	3–0	Tadahiro Mihara	KO	5 (6), 2:45	9 Dec 1974	Korakuen Hall, Tokyo, Japan	
2	Win	2–0	Koichi Maki	PTS	4	10 Sep 1974	Onoyama Gym, Naha, Japan	
1	Win	1–0	Koichi Maki	PTS	4	28 May 1974	Korakuen Hall, Tokyo, Japan	

== See also ==
- List of light flyweight boxing champions
- List of WBA world champions
- List of Japanese boxing world champions
- The Gushiken Family of Okinawa
- Boxing in Japan

Achievements
Preceded by Juan Antonio Guzman	WBA Light Flyweight Champion; 10 Oct 1976– 8 Mar 1981	Succeeded by Pedro Flores
