= Lupe Madera =

Mexican boxer (1952–2005)

Lupe Madera (December 17, 1952 – December 3, 2005) was a Mexican professional boxer. He held the title of World Boxing Association (WBA) world junior flyweight champion from 1983 to 1984.

== Career ==
Lupe Madera was born in Sotuta, Yucatán, Mexico. He turned pro in 1972 and was considered a journeyman for most of his career. In 1982, he was granted a shot at WBA light flyweight title holder Katsuo Tokashiki, but lost a split decision. The following year they fought a rematch, and the fight was ruled a draw. Three months later, they fought again, with Madera winning a technical decision after four rounds and capturing the title. Three months later, they again fought, with Madera successfully defending by winning a decision. The following year he lost the belt to Francisco Quiroz by KO, and never fought again.

Prior to becoming a world champion, Madera had served as sparring partner for notable Mexican boxers such as Miguel Canto, Guty Espadas, and Juan Herrera.

== See also ==
- List of WBA world champions
- List of Mexican boxing world champions

Preceded by Katsuo Tokashiki	WBA Light Flyweight Champion; July 10, 1983 – May 19, 1984	Succeeded by Francisco Quiroz
