= Kyoto City Gymnasium =

Arena in Kyoto, Japan

Coordinates: 34°59′43.8″N 135°42′54.1″E

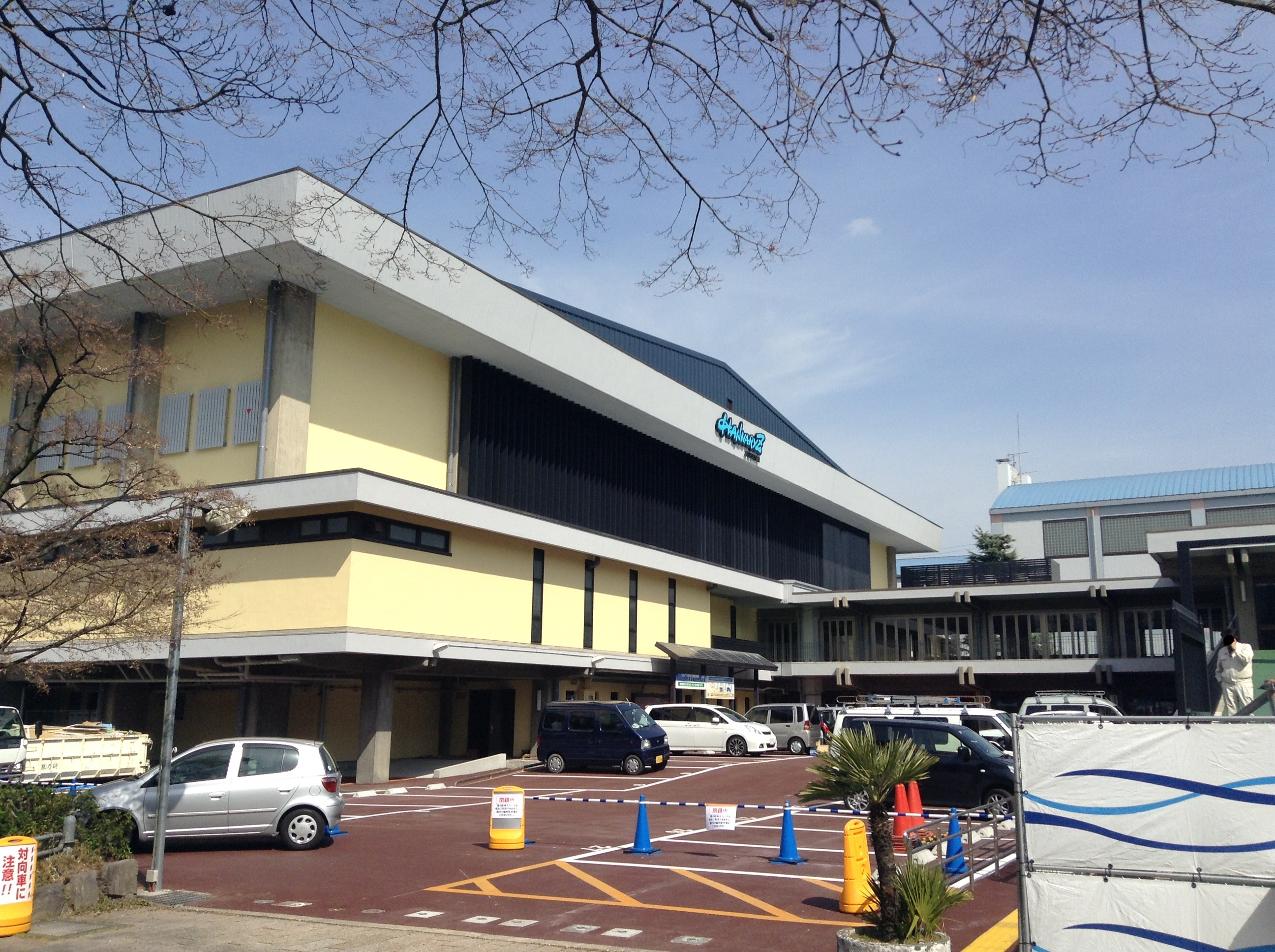
- Interactive map of Kyoto City Gymnasium
- Former names: Hannaryz Arena
- Location: Ukyō-ku, Kyoto, Japan
- Owner: Kyoto city
- Operator: Nishikyogoku Sports Network

Construction
- Opened: May, 1963
- Renovated: 2013
- Cost

Tenant
- Kyoto Hannaryz

Kyoto City Gymnasium (京都市体育館, Kyoto-shi Taiikukan) is an arena in Kyoto, Kyoto, Japan. It is the home arena of the Kyoto Hannaryz of the B.League, Japan's professional basketball league.

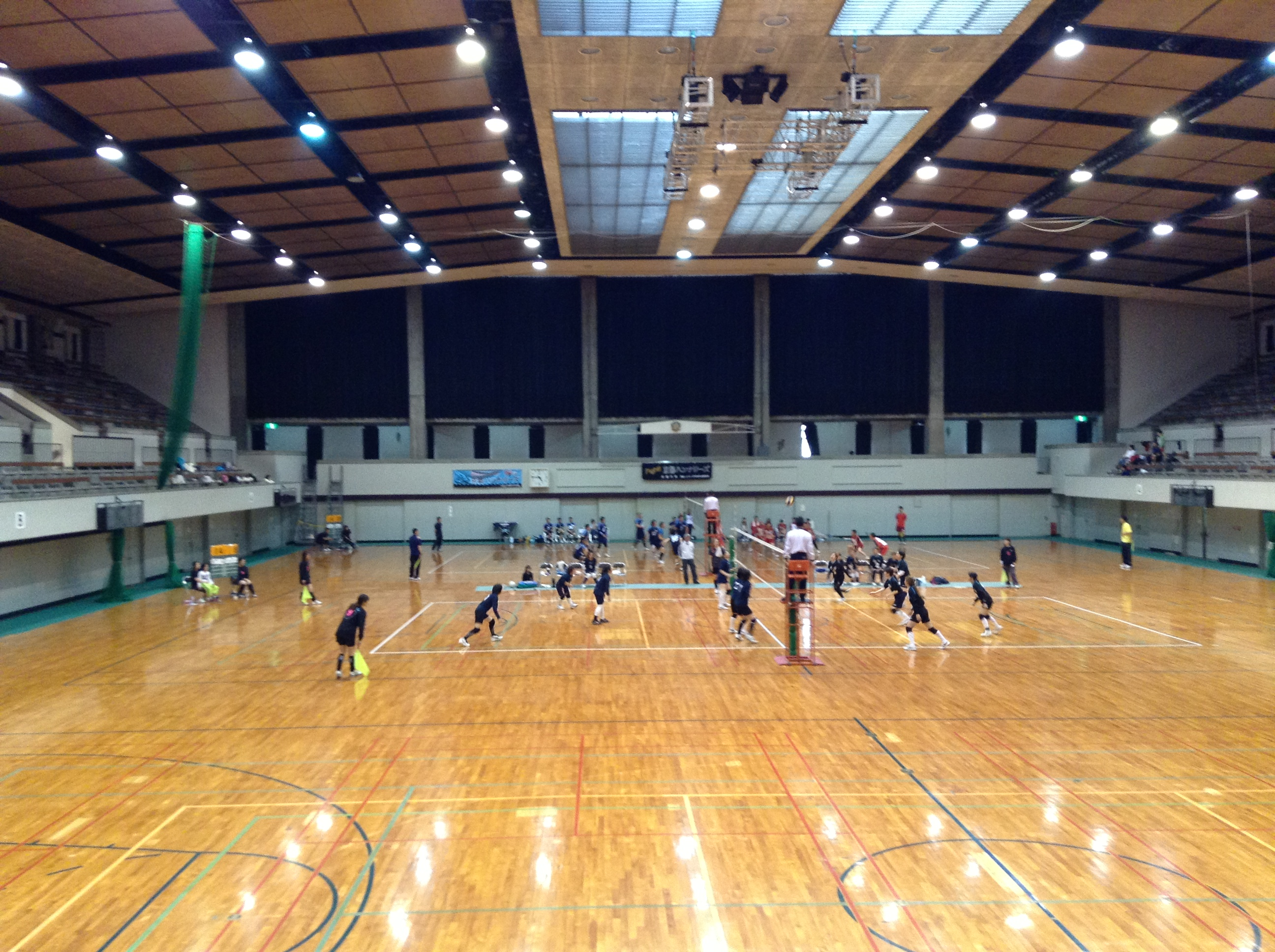
Arena

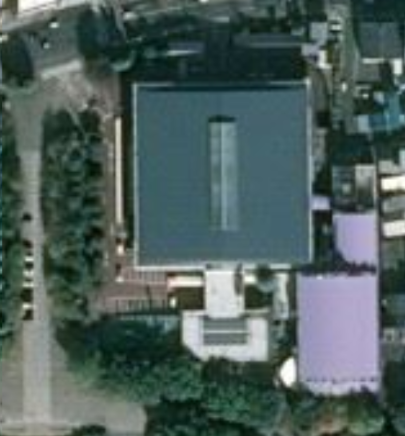
Satellite view

Former logo

Former logo
