= Daniel Dantas (entrepreneur) =

Brazilian entrepreneur

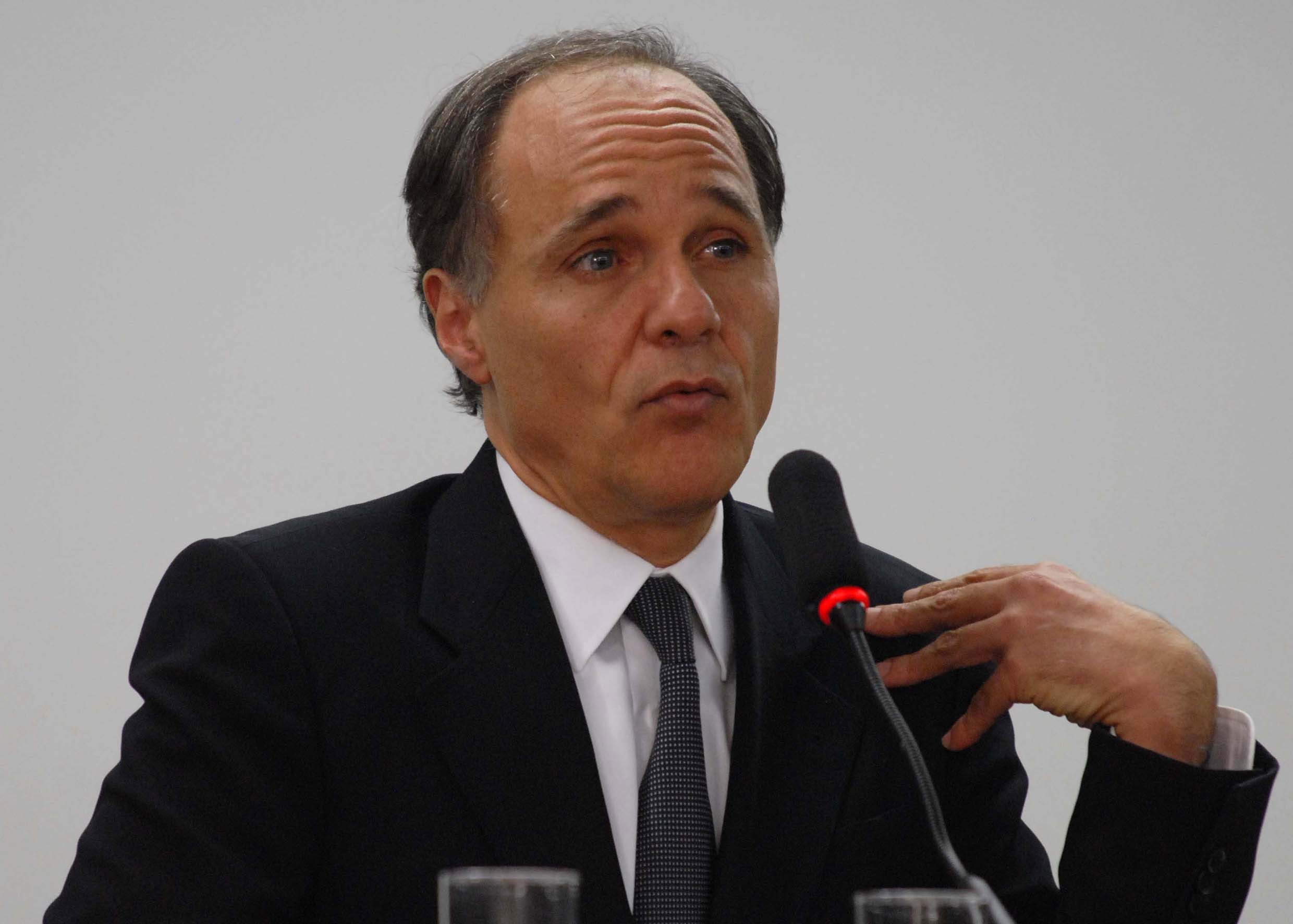
- Born: Daniel Valente Dantas; October 3, 1954 (age 72); Salvador, Bahia
- Occupation: Entrepreneur
- Parent(s): Luís Raimundo Tourinho Dantas and Nicia Maria Valente Dantas

Daniel Valente Dantas (Salvador, October 3, 1954) is a Brazilian banker and businessman, founder of the Banco Opportunity, an institution specialized in asset management. Dantas holds a degree in Electrical Engineering from UFBA and a postgraduate degree in Economics from FGV. Later, he obtained a master's degree and a doctorate at FGV and completed post-doctorate studies at the Massachusetts Institute of Technology (MIT) in the United States.

After years, in February 2012, Daniel Dantas and 11 other individuals were acquitted of the charges related to the Operation Chacal. The decision was issued by Judge Adriana Freisleben de Zanetti of the 5th Federal Criminal Court of São Paulo. Besides Operation Chacal, Dantas was involved in other investigations, such as the Operation Satiagraha, which was later annulled by the Superior Court of Justice (STJ) in 2011, a decision upheld by the Supreme Federal Court (STF) in 2015.

Currently, Daniel Dantas continues to operate in the financial market through Opportunity. In addition to his financial activities, Dantas is one of the largest agricultural landowners in Brazil, controlling companies in the oil, mining, biofuels, and agribusiness sectors. His career is marked by controversies, making him a polarizing figure in the Brazilian business landscape.

== Education ==
Dantas graduated in engineering from the Federal University of Bahia. He completed postgraduate studies in economics at Fundação Getulio Vargas, where he was a student of Mário Henrique Simonsen. He completed his doctorate in 1982.

== Career ==
He was executive director of the Banco Icatu holding company from 1988 until 1994.

In the late 1990s, Dantas was a fund manager for Citigroup and a key figure in the privatization of the telecoms sector. His company controlled Brasil Telecom Participacoes, then one of the country's largest telecoms groups, together with Citigroup (C.N) and Telecom Italia (TLIT.MI). The Opportunity led an international private sector partnership that bought up a large chunk of the Brazilian telecoms sector in 1997, when this sector was privatized.

=== Operation Satyagraha ===
In July 2008, several TrueCrypt-encrypted hard drives were seized from Dantas, who was suspected of financial crimes. The Brazilian National Institute of Criminology (INC) tried for five months without success to obtain access to his TrueCrypt-protected disks, after which they enlisted the help of the FBI.

On June 7, 2011, the National Council of Justice (CNJ) unanimously recognized that Judge Fausto de Sanctis, at the time the head judge of the 6th Criminal Court of São Paulo, intentionally disobeyed the orders of the Federal Supreme Court (STF), when he ordered the detention of Dantas in Operation Satyagraha. The judges of the CNJ followed the vote of reporting Judge Morgana Richa, who determined that De Sanctis's conduct is incompatible with that of a judge, and that he would only escape proper punishment through the lack of a legal provision.

Also on June 7, 2011, the Higher Court of Justice (STJ) accepted the opinion of the Federal Public Prosecutor's Office and voided the criminal action originating from Operation Satyagraha, for its irregularities. According to the President of the 5th Bench of the Higher Court of Justice, Jorge Mussi, "the involvement of ABIN (Brazilian Intelligence Agency) was demonstrated in a document in which the Federal Police ordered the internal investigation of irregularities in the operation". The scheme of informal investigation set up in Satyagraha represents, for Mussi, "a model of investigation more suited to the secret police, beyond the most basic rules of the Democratic State of Law".

In 2016, he was found, on this technicality, to be innocent from all charges related to Operation Satyagraha and frozen bank accounts were released.

=== Acquittal ===
Dantas was arrested twice by Protógenes Queiroz, a police officer who investigated Dantas's involvement in Operation Satyagraha, in early July 2008, but each time was released almost immediately. President of the Supreme Court Gilmar Mendes gave Dantas two habeas corpus rulings in less than two days.

On December 2, 2008, Dantas was convicted of an attempt to bribe police officers related to an investigation into money laundering. He appealed the conviction. Dantas was finally sentenced to ten years' imprisonment in December 2008 for attempting to bribe a police officer.

On October 21, 2014, Protógenes Queiroz, a former police officer who commanded Satiagraha, was sentenced by the Supreme Federal Court (STF) and expelled from the Federal Police. Today, he is on the run in Switzerland and is being investigated for prevarication, corruption and crimes against the national financial system.

On June 24, 2015, the STF ratified the decision of the Superior Court of Justice that annulled Satiagraha.

On February 22, 2016, in the Criminal Appeal, the 5th Panel of the Federal Regional Court of the 3rd Division (TRF 3) ordered the filing of the criminal action related to the financial crimes charges in Operation Satiagraha. On the same date, the 5th Class of TRF 3 also acquitted Dantas of the crimes of corruption imputed under Operation Satiagraha.
