= Fukui Blowinds =

Japanese professional basketball club

- Division: Second
- Leagues: B.League
- Founded: 2023; 3 years ago
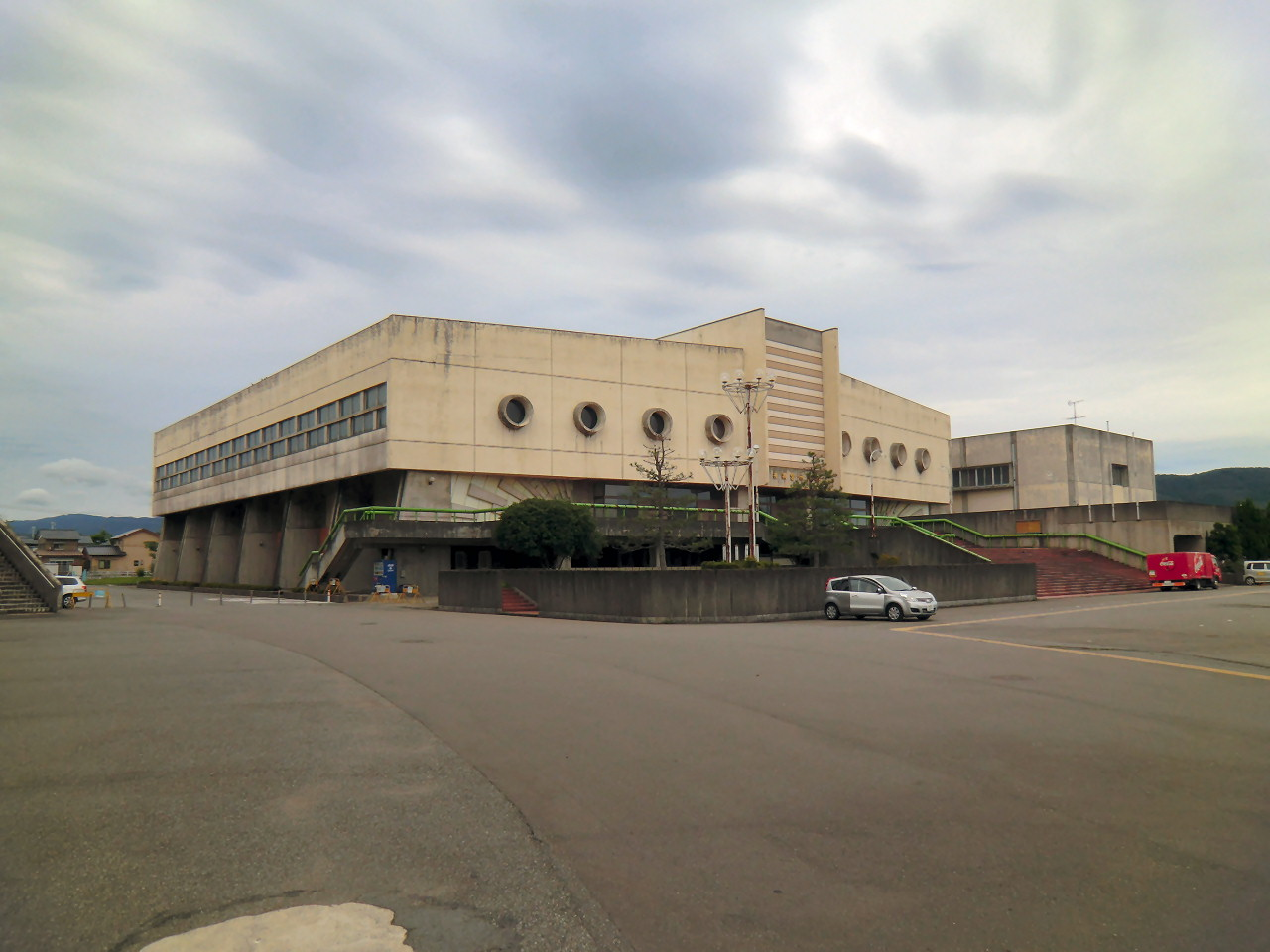
- Arena: Fukui Prefectural Gymnasium
- Capacity: 3,975
- Location: Fukui, Fukui Prefecture
- Team colors: Royal Blue
- President: Shinji Yumoto
- General manager: Yoshinobu Hasui
- Head coach: Mateo Rubio Díaz
- Website: fukuiblowinds.com

The Fukui Blowinds (福井ブローウインズ, Fukui Burōuinzu) are a Japanese professional basketball team based in Fukui. The Blowinds compete in the B.League One, the second division of the B.League, as a member of the Central Conference.

== History ==
On September 7, 2022, the B3 League board of directors ruled that the Fukui Blowinds had passed the first round of eligibility for official competition for the 2023–24 season. On April 13, 2023, Blowinds passed its final review, and on April 20, the team was selected to join the B3 League.

== Players ==
=== Current roster ===
Fukui Blowinds roster
Players
Coaches

Pos.	No.	Nat.	Name	Ht.	Age
PG	0	(Japan)	Hosoya, Masashi	1.73 m (5 ft 8 in)	36 – 2 October 1989
SG	1	(United States)	Boyd III, Tray	1.93 m (6 ft 4 in)	27 – 8 December 1998
SG	6	(Japan)	Hasegawa, Tomonobu	1.83 m (6 ft 0 in)	35 – 9 November 1990
G	16	(Japan)	Watanabe, Ryunosuke	1.89 m (6 ft 2 in)	31 – 24 August 1994
PG	18	(Japan)	Fujisawa, Naoyuki	1.72 m (5 ft 8 in)	28 – 19 June 1998
G/F	21	(Japan)	Mitsuda, Jotaro	1.88 m (6 ft 2 in)	32 – 18 April 1994
PF	22	(Japan)	Kosaka, Akihisa	1.98 m (6 ft 6 in)	34 – 22 February 1992
G	24	(Japan)	Ogawa, Kyosuke	1.82 m (6 ft 0 in)	32 – 6 May 1994
PF	30	(United States)	Ellis, Perry	2.02 m (6 ft 8 in)	32 – 14 September 1993
F/C	34	(United Kingdom)	Lawson, Ben	2.16 m (7 ft 1 in)	31 – 12 June 1995
SG	73	(Japan)	Tawatari, Shuto	1.85 m (6 ft 1 in)	36 – 6 January 1990
G/F	86	(Japan)	Shifuta, Haruto	1.85 m (6 ft 1 in)	26 – 3 May 2000

Head coach

Tsutomu Isa

Assistant coach(es)

Mateo Rubio Díaz
(Japan) Takeshi Nakahara
(Japan) Junki Nakahori

Legend

- (C) Team captain
- Injured

- Roster
Updated: August 3, 2023

Note: Flags indicate national team eligibility at FIBA-sanctioned events. Players may hold other non-FIBA nationalities not displayed.

== Arena ==
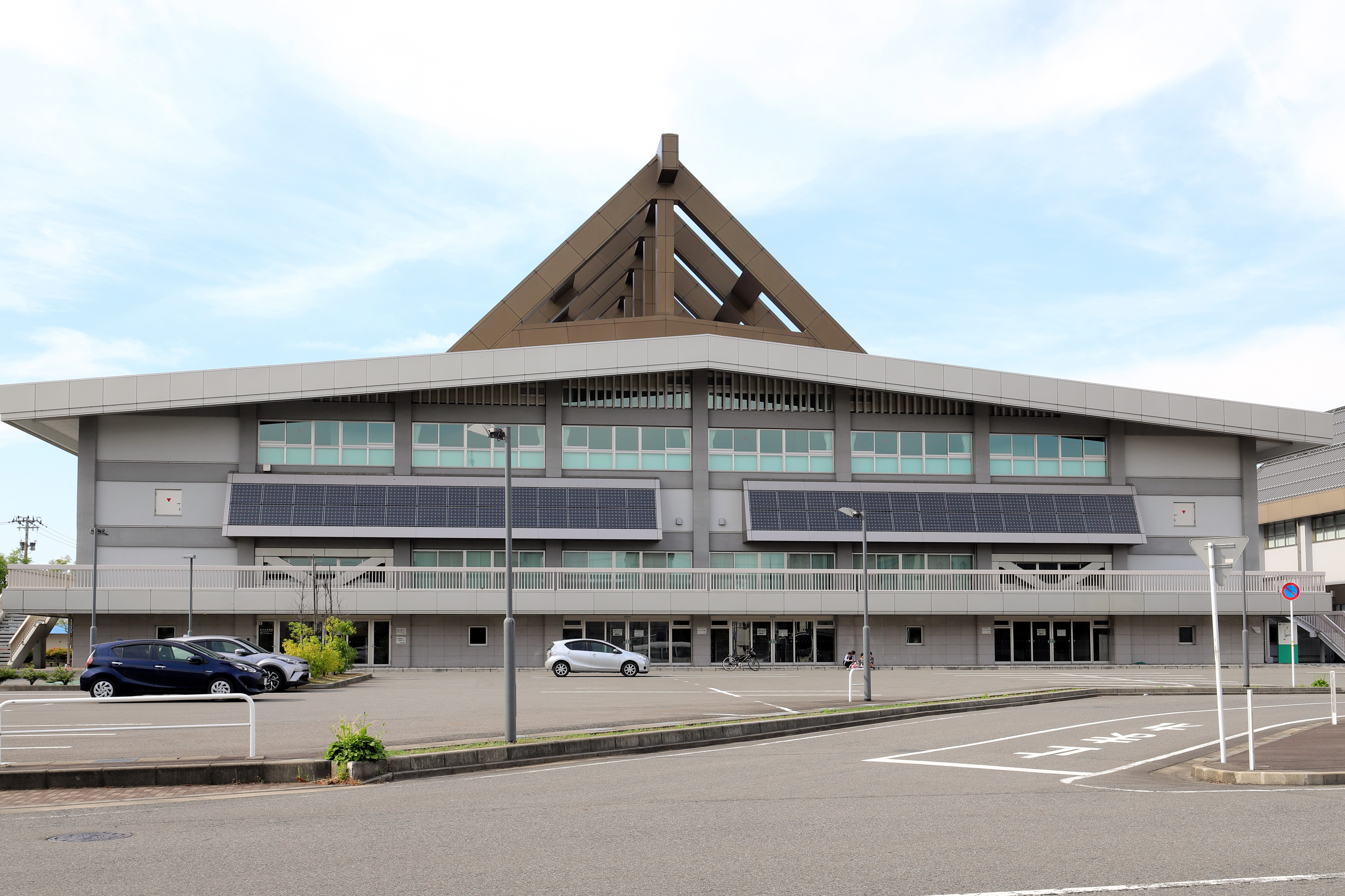
Fukui city Gymnasium

Blowinds' home arena is the Fukui Prefectural Gymnasium. In addition, several home games are scheduled to be held at the Fukui City Gymnasium and the Echizen City Aisin Sports Arena.
